= List of Chicago Landmarks =

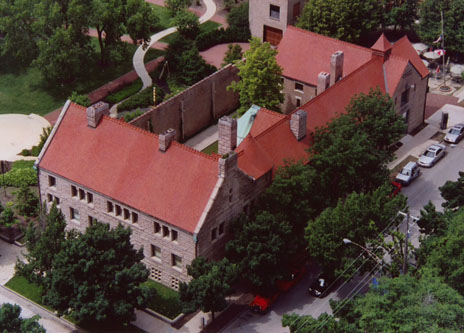
Glessner House, designated on October 14, 1970, as one of the first official Chicago Landmarks

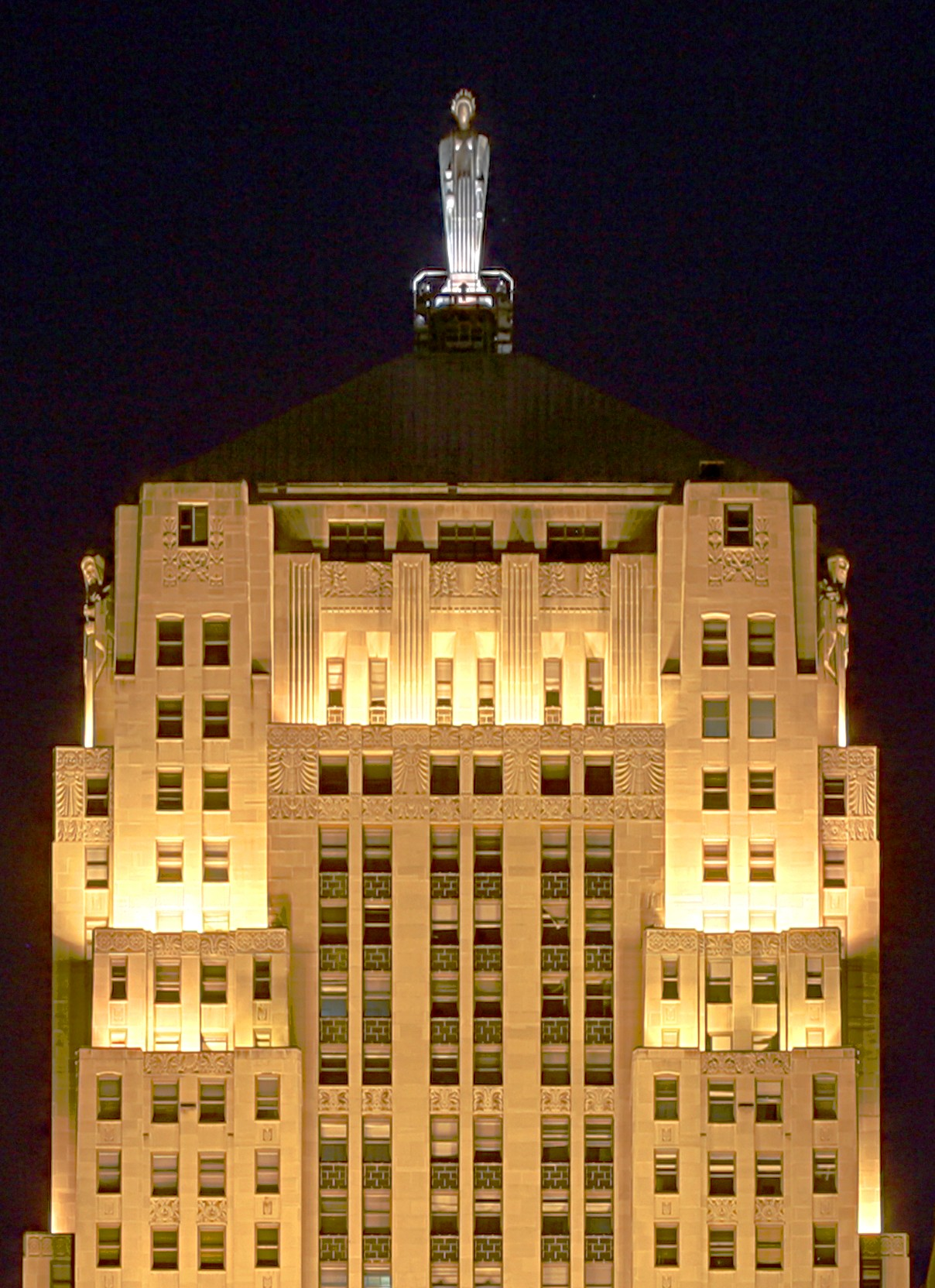
Night view of the top of The Chicago Board of Trade Building at 141 West Jackson, an address that has twice housed Chicago's tallest building

Chicago Landmark is a designation by the mayor and the City Council of Chicago for historic sites in Chicago, Illinois. Listed sites are selected after meeting a combination of criteria, including historical, economic, architectural, artistic, cultural, and social values. Once a site is designated as a landmark, it is subject to the Chicago Landmarks Ordinance, which requires that any alterations beyond routine maintenance, up to and including demolition, must have their permit reviewed by the Landmarks Commission. Many Chicago Landmarks are also listed on the National Register of Historic Places, providing federal tax support for preservation, and some are further designated National Historic Landmarks, providing additional federal oversight.

== Criteria ==
The mayor and the City Council appoint a nine-member Commission on Chicago Landmarks to develop landmark recommendations in accordance with a 1968 Chicago city ordinance. The commission considers areas, districts, places, buildings, structures, works of art, and other objects within the City of Chicago for nomination based solely on whether each meets two or more of the following criteria:

1. Its value as an example of the architectural, cultural, economical, historical, social, or other aspect of the heritage of the City of Chicago, State of Illinois, or the United States;
2. Its location as a site of a significant historic event which may or may not have taken place within or involved the use of any existing improvements;
3. Its identification with a person or persons who significantly contributed to architectural, cultural, economic, historic, social, or other aspect of the development of the City of Chicago, State of Illinois, or the United States;
4. Its exemplification of an architectural type or style distinguished by innovation, rarity, uniqueness, or overall quality of design, detail, materials or craftsmanship;
5. Its identification as the work of an architect, designer, engineer, or builder whose individual work is significant in the history or development of the City of Chicago, the State of Illinois, or the United States;
6. Its representation of an architectural, cultural, economic, historic, social, or other theme expressed through distinctive areas, districts, places, buildings, structures, works of art, or other objects that may or may not be contiguous;
7. Its unique location or distinctive physical appearance or presence representing an established and familiar visual feature of a neighborhood, community, or the City of Chicago.

Once the commission has determined that a candidate meets at least two of the above criteria, the group may provide a preliminary landmark designation if the candidate "has a significant historic, community, architectural or aesthetic interest or value, the integrity of which is preserved in light of its location, design, setting, materials, workmanship, and ability to express such historic, community, architectural or aesthetic interest or value."

== History ==
In Chicago, the historic preservation movement initially sought to ensure the survival of individual buildings of special significance. However, the movement has evolved to include districts and neighborhoods and even encompasses distinctive areas of the natural environment. Preservation has become an integral element of urban planning and design. Three trends led to popular support of the formalization of the movement in response to extensive and far-reaching destruction of Chicago's environment:

1. government-sponsored "urban renewal", which had resulted in destruction of some residential areas;
2. construction of high-speed, limited-access expressways financed largely by federal highway funds, which divided neighborhoods; and
3. the real estate boom in response to the demand for increased office space in the Loop.

In 1957, Leon Despres (Chicago City Council alderman from the 5th ward) began the landmark preservation movement in Chicago, by adopting the Frank Lloyd Wright-designed Robie House. This led to the formation of the City Landmarks Commission, who chose 39 buildings as "honorary" landmarks. That body evolved into the present Commission on Chicago Landmarks which was empowered by Despres's 1968 city ordinance to select and protect 12 important buildings as the inaugural official Chicago Landmarks. Although the movement was unable to save either Louis Sullivan's Garrick Theater in 1960 or Sullivan's Chicago Stock Exchange Building in 1972, the efforts spawned the Landmarks Preservation Council of Illinois in addition to the municipal Commission.

== National recognition ==
Many landmarks have been designated with National Historic Landmark status by the United States Secretary of the Interior for historical significance. All of those and a number of other districts, sites, buildings, structures, and objects worthy of preservation have been listed on the National Register of Historic Places. Not all Chicago Landmarks have been listed on the National Register, and not all Registered Historic Places (not even all of those that are further designated National Historic Landmarks) have been designated Chicago Landmarks. No Chicago Landmarks are classified as any other type of National Park System protected area including National Parks, National Monuments, or National Preserves. The charts below detail these designations for the city of Chicago-designated sites and the National Historic Landmarks.

== List of landmarks ==
For consistency, the list below uses the name from the Chicago Landmark website. Neighborhood names and boundaries are consistent with the community areas in Chicago.

Chicago Landmark	Image	Designation date	Construction date or period	Location	Community area	NRHP date	NHL date
227 East Walton Place Apartment Building	Upload image	June 6, 2012	1956	227 E. Walton Place; 41°54′0.2″N 87°37′14.7″W	Near North Side		
300 West Adams Building	300 W Adams	May 13, 2009	1927	300 W. Adams Street; 41°52′47″N 87°38′09″W	Loop		
333 North Michigan Building	333 North Michigan viewed from the north.	February 7, 1997	1928	333 N. Michigan Avenue; 41°53′16″N 87°37′27″W	Loop		
35 East Wacker Building	35 East Wacker once housed a 22-story car lift.	February 9, 1994	1925–1927	35 E. Wacker Drive; 41°53′11″N 87°37′36″W	Loop		
42nd Precinct / Town Hall Police Station	42nd Precinct Police Station	June 6, 2013	1907	3600 N. Halsted Street; 41°56′51″N 87°39′00″W	Lake View		
63rd Street Bathing Pavilion	63rd Street Bathing Pavilion.	December 8, 2004	1919	Intersection of S. Lake Shore Drive and E. 63rd Street; 41°46′53″N 87°34′26″W	Woodlawn		
6901 Oglesby Cooperative Apartment Building	6901 Oglesby Cooperative Apartment Building	September 10, 2008	1928–1929	6901 S. Oglesby Avenue; 41°46′11″N 87°34′04″W	South Shore		
860-880 Lake Shore Drive	860-880 Lake Shore Drive viewed from the southeast.	June 10, 1996	1949–1951	860-880 N. Lake Shore Drive; 41°53′56″N 87°37′08″W	Near North Side	August 28, 1980	
Dr. Wallace C. Abbott House	Abbott House.	March 1, 2006	1891	4605 N. Hermitage Avenue; 41°57′55″N 87°40′20″W	Uptown		
Adams House	Adams House.	June 16, 1994	1900–1901	9326 S. Pleasant Avenue; 41°43′27″N 87°40′12″W	Beverly		
All Saints Church and Rectory (Ravenswood, Illinois)	All Saints Church and Rectory viewed from the northeast.	December 27, 1982	1883, 1905	4550 N. Hermitage Avenue; 41°57′54″N 87°40′22″W	Uptown		
Allerton Hotel	Allerton Hotel viewed from the southwest	May 29, 1998	1922–1924	701 N. Michigan Avenue; 41°53′43″N 87°37′25″W	Near North Side		
Alta Vista Terrace District	A house in the Alta Vista Terrace District	September 15, 1971	1900–1904	3800 block of N. Alta Vista Terrace (1050 W)	Lake View	March 16, 1972	
American Book Company Building		July 29, 2009	1912	320 E. Cermak Road/2132 S. Calumet Avenue; 41°51′13″N 87°37′10″W	Near South Side		
American School of Correspondence		April 15, 1995	1906–1907	850 E. 58th Street; 41°47′23″N 87°36′14″W	Hyde Park		
American System-Built Houses	The H Howard Hyde House (10541 S. Hoyne Avenue)	July 13, 1994	1917	10410 and 10541 S. Hoyne Avenue; 41°42′16″N 87°40′28″W; 41°42′06″N 87°40′26″W	Beverly		
(Former) Anshe Sholom Synagogue Building	Upload image	June 25, 2014	1926	754 S. Independence Boulevard; 41°52′16.2″N 87°43′14.7″W	West Garfield Park		
Arlington and Roslyn Place District	Buildings on Arlington Place	November 15, 1989	1894–1910	400-blocks of W. Arlington Place and W. Roslyn Place, between N. Clark Street and N. Lakeview Avenue	Lincoln Park		
Arlington-Deming District	Upload image	September 27, 2007	1870–1930	Predominantly 500- and 600-Blocks of W. Arlington Place, 500- and 600-Blocks of W. Deming Place, 2400-Block of N. Geneva Terrace; and 2400-Block of N. Orchard Street	Lincoln Park		
Armitage-Halsted District	Intersection of Armitage Ave and Halsted St looking north	February 5, 2003	1870–1930	Predominately W. Armitage Avenue between N. Halsted Street and N. Racine Avenue, and N. Halsted Street between W. Armitage Avenue and W. Webster Street	Lincoln Park		
Assumption School Building	Assumption School Building viewed from the north	July 10, 2003	1899	319 W. Erie Street; 41°53′37″N 87°38′12″W	Near North Side		
Astor Street District	East side of Astor Street	December 19, 1975	1880–1940	1200–1600 blocks of N. Astor Street (and cross streets)	Near North Side		
Auditorium Building	The Auditorium Building viewed from across Michigan Ave.	September 15, 1976	1886–1890	430 S. Michigan Avenue; 41°52′33″N 87°37′31″W	Loop	April 17, 1970	May 15, 1975
Emil Bach House	Bach House viewed from the street	September 28, 1977	1915	7415 N. Sheridan Road; 42°0′58″N 87°39′53″W	Rogers Park	January 23, 1979	
Bachman House	Bachman House viewed from the street	December 9, 1992	1947–1948	1244 W. Carmen Avenue; 41°58′29″N 87°39′42″W	Uptown		
Beeson House and Coach House	Beeson House and Coach House	January 20, 1999	1892	5810 W. Midway Park; 41°53′21″N 87°46′14″W	Austin		
Belmont-Sheffield Trust and Savings Bank Building	Detail of Bank entrance	July 9, 2008	1929	1001 W. Belmont Avenue; 41°56′23″N 87°39′16″W	Lake View	March 1, 1984	
Beverly/Morgan Railroad District	99th Street Metra Station	April 15, 1995	1889–1945	W. 91st, 95th, 99th, 107th, 111th, and 115th Streets, along the Metra railroad line	Beverly and Morgan Park		
Biograph Theater	Biograph Theater entrance and marquee	March 28, 2001	1914	2433–43 N. Lincoln Avenue; 41°55′35″N 87°38′59″W	Lincoln Park	May 17, 1984	
Bissell Street District		September 5, 2007	1883	2100-Block of N. Bissell Street between W. Webster and W. Dickens Avenues	Lincoln Park		
Black Metropolis-Bronzeville District	Upload image	September 9, 1998	1889–1936	3619-27 S. State Street; 3647-55 S. State Street; 3763 S. Wabash Avenue; 3435 S. Indiana Avenue; 3140 S. Indiana Avenue; 3533 S. Giles Avenue; 315 E. 35th Street; 3501 S. King Drive	Douglas	April 30, 1986	
Blackstone Hotel	Blackstone Hotel from Grant Park	May 29, 1998	1908–1910	636 S. Michigan Avenue; 41°52′24″N 87°37′29″W	Loop	May 8, 1986	
Blackstone Library	Blackstone Library entrance facade	December 8, 2010	1904	4904 S. Lake Park Avenue; 41°48′21″N 87°35′25″W	Kenwood		
Blackwell-Israel Samuel A.M.E. Zion Church Building	Upload image	February 6, 2020	1886	3956 S. Langley Avenue; 41°49′21.2″N 87°36′36.2″W	Grand Boulevard		
Brewster Apartments	Brewster Apartments viewed from the southeast	October 6, 1982	1893	2800 N. Pine Grove Avenue; 41°55′59″N 87°38′30″W	Lake View		
Brooks Building	Brooks Building viewed from the northwest	January 14, 1997	1909–1910	223 W. Jackson Boulevard; 41°52′40″N 87°38′05″W	Loop		
Gwendolyn Brooks House	Gwendolyn Brooks House	February 10, 2010	1890	7428 S. Evans Avenue; 41°45′34.3″N 87°36′25″W	Greater Grand Crossing		
Bryn Mawr Apartment Hotel; Belle Shore Apartment Hotel	Belle Shore Apartment Hotel viewed from the southwest	January 20, 1999	1928–1929	5550 N. Kenmore Avenue; 41°59′00″N 87°39′25″W; 1062 W. Bryn Mawr Avenue; 41°59′02″N 87°39′27″W	Edgewater	April 20, 1995	
Clarence Buckingham Memorial Fountain and Garden	Buckingham Fountain	August 30, 2000	1927	Bounded by S. Lake Shore Drive, E. Balbo Drive, S. Columbus Drive and E. Jackson Drive; 41°52′33″N 87°37′08″W	Loop		
Burling Row House District	Row houses in the district	November 15, 2000	1875	2225–2245 N. Burling Street	Lincoln Park		
Bush Temple of Music	Bush Temple of Music viewed from the southeast	June 27, 2001	1901	100 W. Chicago Avenue; 41°53′49″N 87°37′54″W	Near North Side		
Cable House		October 2, 1991	1886	25 E. Erie Street; 41°53′38″N 87°37′37″W	Near North Side		
Cairo Supper House	Cairo Supper Club Building	August 7, 2014	1920	4015-4017 N. Sheridan Road; 41°57′19″N 87°39′15.8″W	Uptown		
Alfred Caldwell Lily Pool	view of the pavilion at the Lily Pool	November 6, 2002	1936–1938	North end of Lincoln Park Zoo at W. Fullerton Parkway; 41°55′31″N 87°38′02″W	Lincoln Park	February 17, 2006	February 17, 2006
Calumet/Giles Prairie District	Upload image	July 13, 1988	1870–1910	3100-3500 blocks of S. Calumet, Giles and Prairie Avenues	Douglas		
Calumet National Bank Building	Calumet National Bank Building	July 9, 2008	1910	9117 S. Commercial Avenue; 41°43′46.2″N 87°33′03″W	South Chicago		
Calumet Park Fieldhouse	Calumet Park Fieldhousel	October 4, 2006	1922–1924	9801 S. Avenue G 41°43′04″N 87°31′50″W	East Side	August 21, 2003	
Canaan Baptist Church of Christ Building	Upload image	July 26, 2006	1904–1905	6657-59 S. Harvard Avenue; 41°46′22″N 87°37′59″W	Englewood		
Carbide and Carbon Building	Carbide and Carbon Building viewed from the southeast	May 9, 1996	1929	230 N. Michigan Avenue; 41°53′12″N 87°37′30″W	Loop		
Carson, Pirie, Scott and Company Building	Carson, Pirie, Scott and Company Building viewed from the northwest	November 5, 1970	1898–1899; 1902–1904; Additions in 1905–1906 and 1960–1961	1 S. State Street; 41°52′54″N 87°37′38″W	Loop	April 17, 1970	May 15, 1975
Cermak Road Bridge District	The two largest buildings and bridge included in the district, viewed from up the river	April 26, 2006	1901–1924	Cermak Road, predominantly between Grove and Jefferson Streets	Lower West Side and Armour Square	May 1, 2012	
Chapin and Gore Building	Chapin and Gore Building viewed from the northeast	January 21, 1982	1904	63 E. Adams Street; 41°52′45.5″N 87°37′31.5″W	Loop	June 27, 1979	
Charnley House	Historic view of the Charnley House from the northwest	August 20, 1972	1891	1365 N. Astor Street; 41°54′27.5″N 87°37′39″W	Near North Side	April 17, 1970	August 5, 1998
Chatham-Greater Grand Crossing Commercial District	Upload image	October 8, 2008	1911–1930	19 buildings in the vicinity of Cottage Grove Avenue and 75th and 79th Streets–two contiguous "core" areas and six non-contiguous individual buildings.	Chatham and Greater Grand Crossing		
Chess Records Office and Studio	Chess Records Office and Studio	May 16, 1990	1911	2120 S. Michigan Avenue; 41°51′13″N 87°37′27″W	Near South Side		
Chicago & Alton Railway Bridge	The old Chicago and Alton Railway Bridge next to Ashland L station on the Orange Line	December 12, 2007	1906	East of Ashland Avenue and North of Archer Avenue, Fork of the South Branch of the Chicago River; 41°50′23″N 87°39′53″W	McKinley Park		
Chicago & Illinois Western Railway Bridge	Upload image	December 12, 2007	1914	33rd Street and East of Kedzie Avenue, Slip of the Chicago Sanitary and Ship Canal. 41°49′56″N 87°42′10″W	Brighton Park		
Chicago & North Western Railway Office Building		May 20, 2020	1905	226 W. Jackson Boulevard; 41°52′43″N 87°38′5.8″W	Loop		
Chicago & North Western Railway Powerhouse	One corner of the Chicago & North Western Railway Powerhouse	January 11, 2006	1909–1911	211 N. Clinton Street; 41°53′11″N 87°38′25″W	Near West Side	October 12, 2004	
Chicago & Northwestern Railway Bridge	Chicago & Northwestern Railway Bridge permanently locked in the raised position	December 12, 2007	1907–1908	South of Kinzie Street and East of Canal Street, North Branch of the Chicago River; 41°53′18.5″N 87°38′21″W	Near North Side		
Chicago & Western Indiana Railroad Bridge	Chicago & Western Indiana Railroad Bridge (left) and Torrence Avenue Bridge (right)	December 12, 2007	1967–1968	North of 126th Street and East of Torrence Avenue, Calumet River; 41°40′10″N 87°33′32″W	South Deering		
Chicago Bee Building	Both buildings that make up the Chicago Bee Building	September 9, 1998	1929–1931	3647-3655 S. State Street; 41°49′41″N 87°37′34.5″W	Douglas	April 30, 1986	
Chicago Board of Trade Building	Chicago Board of Trade Building from the north up LaSalle Street	May 4, 1977	1930	141 W. Jackson Boulevard; 41°52′40″N 87°37′56″W	Loop	June 16, 1978	June 2, 1978
Chicago Building	Chicago Building viewed from northeast	March 26, 1996	1904–1905	7 W. Madison Street; 41°52′54.5″N 87°37′41″W	Loop	September 5, 1975	
Chicago City Bank and Trust Building		October 8, 2008	1929–1930	815 W. 63rd Street; 41°46′46″N 87°38′44″W	Englewood		
Chicago Defender Building	Chicago Defender Building	September 9, 1998	1899	3435 S. Indiana Avenue; 41°49′54.5″N 87°37′17″W	Douglas		
Site of the Origin of the Chicago Fire of 1871		September 15, 1971	1871; Sculpture erected 1961	W. DeKoven and S. Jefferson Streets; 41°52′08.5″N 87°38′32″W	Near West Side		
Chicago Harbor Lighthouse	Chicago Harbor Lighthouse viewed from the east	April 9, 2003	1893; 1917–1918	South End of the North Breakwater, North Side of the Chicago Harbor Entrance; 41°53′21.5″N 87°35′26″W	Near North Side	July 19, 1984	
Former Chicago Historical Society Building	Chicago Historical Society Building viewed from the east	February 26, 1997	1892	632 N. Dearborn Street; 41°53′36″N 87°37′48″W	Near North Side	November 28, 1978	
Chicago, Milwaukee & St. Paul Railway Bridge No. Z-2	Chicago, Milwaukee & St. Paul Railway Bridge No. Z-2	December 12, 2007	1901–1902	N. Cherry Avenue and W. North Avenue, North Branch of the Chicago River41°54′37″N 87°39′20″W	Near North Side		
Chicago Motor Club Building		March 1, 2012	1928	68 E. Wacker Place; 41°53′13.8″N 87°37′31.5″W	Loop		
Chicago Orphan Asylum Building		May 13, 2009	1898–1999	5120 S. Dr. Martin Luther King Jr. Drivee; 41°48′05″N 87°36′59″W	Washington Park		
Chicago Public Library/Cultural Center	The center, as the nation's first free municipal cultural center, is one of Chicago's top 10 tourist attractions.	November 15, 1976	1897	78 E. Washington Street; 41°53′02″N 87°37′30″W	Loop	July 31, 1972	
Chicago Theatre	The Chicago Theatre was preserved in a four-year battle involving the Landmarks Preservation Council of Illinois.	January 28, 1983	1921	175 N. State Street; 41°53′07″N 87°37′39″W	Loop	June 6, 1979	
Chicago Varnish Company Building	Chicago Varnish Company Building viewed from the northwest	July 25, 2001	1895	33 W. Kinzie Street; 41°53′20.5″N 87°37′45.5″W	Near North Side	June 14, 2001	
City Hall-County Building	County Building	January 21, 1982	1905–1908; 1909–1911	121 N. LaSalle Street/118 N. Clark Street; 41°53′02″N 87°37′54″W	Loop		
Civic Opera Building	river facade of the Civic Opera Building	February 5, 1998	1927–1929	20 N. Wacker Drive; 41°52′57″N 87°38′15″W	Loop		
Clarke House	Clarke House viewed from the northwest	October 14, 1970	1836	1855 S. Indiana Avenue; 41°51′25.5″N 87°37′19″W	Near South Side	May 6, 1971	
Colvin House	Colvin House viewed from the east	October 5, 1994	1909	5940 N. Sheridan Road; 41°59′25″N 87°39′20.5″W	Edgewater		
Commercial National Bank Building	The National Building	June 22, 2016	1909	125 S. Clark Street; 41°52′48.2″N 87°37′49.8″W	Loop	June 1, 2013	
Congress Theater	Congress Theater viewed from the west	July 10, 2002	1925–1926	2117–2139 N. Milwaukee Avenue / 2117–2139 N. Rockwell Street; 41°55′12″N 87°41′32″W	Logan Square		
Continental and Commercial Bank Building	Continental and Commercial Bank Building	December 12, 2007	1914	208 S. LaSalle Street; 41°52′45″N 87°37′58″W	Loop	February 14, 2007	
Continental Center		June 27, 2012	1961–1962	55 E. Jackson Boulevard; 41°52′41″N 87°37′32″W	Loop		
Cook County Hospital Administration Building	Cook County Hospital Administration Building	January 23, 2019	1912–1914	1835 West Harrison Street; 41°52′26.2″N 87°40′22.5″W	Near West Side		
Cortland Street Drawbridge	Cortland Street Drawbridge	July 24, 1991	1902	1440 W. Cortland Street; 41°55′01″N 87°39′51″W	Lincoln Park		
Cosmopolitan State Bank Building		October 8, 2008	1920; 1995 Addition	801 N. Clark Street; 41°53′49″N 87°37′51″W	Near North Side		
Courthouse Place	Historic view of Courthouse Place from the east	June 9, 1993	1893	54 W. Hubbard Street; 41°53′25″N 87°37′48″W	Near North Side	November 13, 1984	
Crown Hall	Crown Hall south facade	October 1, 1997	1950–1956	3360 S. State Street; 41°49′59″N 87°37′37″W	Douglas	August 7, 2001	August 7, 2001
Daley Center	Daley Center from State Street	November 6, 2002	1965; 1967 Picasso Sculpture	50 W. Washington Street; 41°53′02″N 87°37′49″W	Loop		
Dearborn Street Station	(Former) Dearborn Station from the northwest	March 2, 1982	1885	47 W. Polk Street; 41°52′19″N 87°37′45″W	Loop	March 26, 1976	
Delaware Building	(Former) Delaware Building from the southwest	November 23, 1983	1872–1874; 1889 two-story addition.	36 W. Randolph Street; 41°53′05″N 87°37′45″W	Loop	July 18, 1974	
August Dewes House		March 9, 2005	1894–1896	509 W. Wrightwood Avenue; 41°55′49″N 87°38′30.5″W	Lincoln Park		
Francis J. Dewes House	Entrance facade of the Francis Dewes House	June 12, 1974	1896	503 W. Wrightwood Avenue; 41°55′49″N 87°38′29.5″W	Lincoln Park	August 14, 1973	
Dexter Building	Dexter Building under demolition after fire	July 31, 1996	1887	630 S. Wabash Avenue; 41°52′25″N 87°37′35″W	Loop		
R.R. Donnelley and Sons Co. Calumet Plant	Calumet Plant	March 31, 2004	1912, 1925, 1929	350 E. Cermak Road; 41°51′12″N 87°37′06″W	Near South Side	February 17, 1983	
Stephen A. Douglas Tomb	Stephen A. Douglas Tomb	September 28, 1977	1881	636 E. 35th Street; 41°49′54″N 87°36′30″W	Douglas	May 28, 1976	
Dover Street District		December 12, 2007	1893–1927	Predominantly 4500–, 4600- and 4700-Blocks of N. Dover Street; and four properties located at 4742-4754 N. Beacon Street	Uptown		
Joseph Downey House and Coach House	Joseph Downey house	April 4, 2013	1906	6205 N. Sheridan Road; 41°59′41.5″N 87°39′19″W	Edgewater		
Drake Fountain	Drake Fountain	March 10, 2004	1892; Relocated 1909	92nd Street at South Chicago and Exchange Avenues; 41°43′41″N 87°33′10″W	South Chicago		
DuPont-Whitehouse House		April 16, 1996	1875–1876	3558 S. Artesian Avenue; 41°49′43″N 87°41′11″W	McKinley Park		
DuSable High School	DuSable High School	October 31, 2012	1931–1935	4934 S. Wabash Avenue; 41°48′17″N 87°37′30″W	Grand Boulevard		
East Lake Shore Drive District	East Lake Shore Drive Historic District from Oak Street Beach	April 18, 1985	1912–1929	140 E. Walton Street, 179-229 E. Lake Shore Drive, and 999 N. Lake Shore Drive	Near North Side		
East Village District	Wood Street in the East Village Historic District	January 11, 2006		Four sections primarily situated on N. Winchester Avenue, N. Wolcott Avenue, N. Honore Street, and N. Hermitage Avenue between W. Chicago Avenue and W. Division Street	West Town	December 8, 2009	
Ebenezer Missionary Baptist Church (formerly Isaiah Temple)	Ebenezer Missionary Baptist Church	July 28, 2011	1898–1899	4501 S. Vincennes Avenue; 41°48′46.9″N 87°36′48.9″W	Grand Boulevard		
Eighth Church of Christ, Scientist	Eighth Church of Christ, Scientist	June 9, 1993	1910–1911	4359 S. Michigan Avenue; 41°48′54″N 87°37′21″W	Grand Boulevard		
Eighth Regiment Armory	Eighth Regiment Armory	September 9, 1998	1914–1915	3533 S. Giles Avenue; 41°49′49″N 87°37′08″W	Douglas	April 30, 1986	
Elam House	Elam House	March 21, 1979	1903	4726 S. Dr. Martin Luther King Jr. Drive; 41°48′30.5″N 87°37′01.5″W	Grand Boulevard		
Eliel House	Eliel House	October 2, 1991	1886	4122 S. Ellis Avenue; 41°49′09.4″N 87°36′09.5″W	Oakland		
Elks National Memorial Headquarters Building	Elks Memorial viewed from the northeast	October 1, 2003	1924–1926	2750 N. Lakeview Avenue; 41°55′56″N 87°38′24″W	Lincoln Park		
Engine Company 5, Truck 2		October 1, 2003	1928	324 S. Desplaines Street; 41°52′38″N 87°38′40″W	Near West Side		
Engine Company 27 (Former)	Engine Company 27 (Former)	October 1, 2003	1874; 1907 addition	1244 N. Wells Street; 41°54′18.7″N 87°38′05″W	Near North Side		
Engine Company 35, Truck 28 (Former)	Engine Company 35, Truck 28 (Former)	October 1, 2003	1894; 1904 addition	1625 N. Damen Avenue; 41°54′40.5″N 87°40′38″W	West Town		
Engine Company 42 (Former)		December 12, 2007	1887	228 W. Illinois Street; 41°53′27.5″N 87°38′07″W	Near North Side		
Engine Company 45, Truck 15		October 1, 2003	1928	4600 S. Cottage Grove Avenue; 41°48′40.3″N 87°36′25″W	Grand Boulevard		
Engine Company 59, Truck 47		October 1, 2003	1928	5714 N. Ridge Avenue; 41°59′09″N 87°39′50″W	Edgewater		
Engine Company 61		October 1, 2003	1927–1928	5349 S. Wabash Avenue; 41°47′48″N 87°37′26″W	Washington Park		
Engine Company 65, Truck 52		October 1, 2003	1929	3000 W. 42nd Street; 41°49′03″N 87°41′59″W	Brighton Park		
Engine Company 78	Engine Company 7	October 1, 2003	1915	1052 W. Waveland Avenue; 41°56′57″N 87°39′23.5″W	Lake View		
Engine Company 84, Truck 51		October 1, 2003	1929	6204 S. Green Street; 41°46′52.5″N 87°38′47″W	Englewood		
Engine Company 86 (Former)		October 1, 2003	1899	2414 W. Cuyler Avenue; 41°57′19″N 87°41′21″W	North Center		
Engine Company 104, Truck 31 (Former)	Engine Company 104, Truck 31 (Former)	October 1, 2003	1905	1401 S. Michigan Avenue; 41°51′50″N 87°37′26″W	Near South Side		
Engine Company 129, Truck 50		October 1, 2003	1928–1929	8120 S. Ashland Avenue; 41°44′45.5″N 87°39′49″W	Auburn Gresham		
Epworth United Methodist Church	Epworth Methodist Episcopal Church	June 21, 2023	1930	5253 N. Kenmore Avenue; 41°58′41.2″N 87°39′22.4″W	Edgewater	June 10, 2008	
Essanay Studios	The Essanay Film Manufacturing Company building was a legendary silent film studio.	March 26, 1996	1908–1915	1333-45 W. Argyle Street; 41°58′21″N 87°39′49″W	Uptown		
Essex Inn	Essex Inn	December 1, 2016	1961	800 S. Michigan Avenue; 41°52′18.9″N 87°37′28.7″W	Loop		
Farwell Building		March 10, 2004	1927	664 N. Michigan Avenue; 41°53′39.4″N 87°37′29″W	Near North Side		
Field Building	Entrance detail of the Field Building	February 9, 1994	1928–1934	135 S. LaSalle Street; 41°52′47″N 87°37′54″W	Loop		
Fine Arts Building	Fine Arts Building viewed from Grant Park	June 7, 1978	1885; Two story addition 1898	410 S. Michigan Avenue; 41°52′35″N 87°37′29″W	Loop	August 11, 1975	
First Baptist Congregational Church		January 21, 1982	1871	60 N. Ashland Avenue; 41°52′59″N 87°40′02″W	Near West Side		
First Church of Deliverance	First Church of Deliverance	October 5, 1994	1939; Towers added 1946	4315 S. Wabash Avenue; 41°48′57″N 87°37′27″W	Grand Boulevard		
Fisher Building	Fisher Building viewed from the southwest	June 7, 1978	1896; 1907 addition	343 S. Dearborn Street; 41°52′38″N 87°37′44.5″W	Loop	March 16, 1976	
Fisher Studio Houses		July 31, 1996	1936	1209 N. State Parkway; 41°54′15.3″N 87°37′42″W	Near North Side		
Five Houses on Avers District		March 2, 1994	1892–1894	1942, 1950, 1952, 1958 and 2102 S. Avers Avenue	North Lawndale		
Florsheim Shoe Company Building		March 29, 2006	1924–1926	3963 W. Belmont Avenue; 41°56′20″N 87°43′53″W	Avondale		
Site of Fort Dearborn		September 15, 1971	1803–1837	Intersection of N. Michigan Avenue and E. Wacker Drive; 41°53′18″N 87°37′28″W	Loop		
Foster House and Stable	Foster House and Stable	May 9, 1996	1900	12147 S. Harvard Avenue; 41°40′22″N 87°37′50″W	West Pullman		
Fremont Row House District	Five houses in the Fremont Row House District	March 10, 2004	1875	2100–2144 N. Fremont Street (even addresses)	Lincoln Park		
Fullerton State Bank (Former)		July 9, 2008	1923	1423-27 W. Fullerton Avenue; 41°55′30″N 87°39′51.5″W	Lincoln Park		
Fulton-Randolph Market District		July 29, 2015	1904–1916	Primarily the 800- to 1100-blocks of W. Fulton Market Street, the 900-block of W. Lake Street, and the 700- to 1000-blocks of W. Randolph Street	Near West Side		
Gage Group Buildings	Gage Group Buildings viewed from the northeast	September 11, 1996	1899–1900	18, 24 and 30 S. Michigan Avenue	Loop	November 14, 1985; 41°52′52.5″N 87°37′29″W	
Garfield Boulevard "L" Station and Overpass	Historic station building	December 12, 2001	1892	319 E. Garfield Boulevard; 41°47′39.5″N 87°37′06″W	Washington Park		
Garfield Park Fieldhouse	Domed entrance to the Garfield Park Fieldhouse	November 18, 2009	1928	100 N. Central Park Avenue; 41°52′58″N 87°42′57″W	East Garfield Park	August 31, 1993	
Gauler Twin Houses	Gauler Twin Houses	June 28, 2000	1908	5917 and 5921 N. Magnolia Avenue; 41°59′22.7″N 87°39′41″W	Edgewater	June 17, 1977	
Greater Union Baptist Church		April 19, 2023		1956 W. Warren Boulevard; 41°52′57.6″N 87°40′35″W	Near West Side		
Henry Gerber House		June 6, 2001	1885	1710 N. Crilly Court; 41°54′47.5″N 87°38′09.5″W	Lincoln Park	June 21, 2015	June 21, 2015
Germania Club Building	South facade of the Germania Club	January 13, 2011	1889	1538–1542 N. Clark Street; 41°54′38″N 87°37′55″W	Near North Side		
Getty Tomb	Carrie Eliza Getty Tomb.	March 10, 1971	1890	Graceland Cemetery, N. Clark Street and W. Irving Park Road; 41°57′40.5″N 87°39′40.3″W	Uptown	February 15, 1974	
Giles-Calumet District		July 29, 2009	1885–1923	Consisting of the following addresses: 3737 through 3847 S. Giles Avenue (odds); 3800 through 3848 S. Calumet Avenue (evens); 3831 through 3847 S. Calumet Avenue (odds); 310 E. 38th Street	Douglas		
Glessner House	Courtyard view of the Glessner House	October 14, 1970	1886	1800 S. Prairie Avenue; 41°51′28″N 87°37′16″W	Near South Side	April 17, 1970	January 7, 1976
Goldblatt Bros. Department Store		April 1, 1998	1921–1922; 1925–1928	1613-35 W. Chicago Avenue; 41°53′45″N 87°40′06″W	West Town		
Greenwood Row House District		December 8, 2004	1903	5200-44 S. Greenwood Avenue	Hyde Park		
Walter Burley Griffin Place District		November 13, 1981	1909–1914	1600–1800 blocks of W. Griffin Place (formerly West 104th Place)	Beverly		
Griffiths-Burroughs House	Griffiths-Burroughs House	February 10, 2010	1892	3806 S. Michigan Avenue; 41°49′31″N 87°37′25″W	Douglas	March 5, 1982	
Groesbeck House	Groesbeck House	January 12, 1993	1869	1304 W. Washington Boulevard; 41°52′59.5″N 87°39′36″W	Near West Side	February 4, 1993	
Samuel H. Gunder House and Coach House	Samuel H. Gunder House	April 4, 2013	1909–1910	6219 N. Sheridan Road; 41°59′43″N 87°39′18″W	Edgewater		
George Cleveland Hall Branch, Chicago Public Library	George Cleveland Hall Branch Library	February 10, 2010	1931	4801 S. Michigan Avenue; 41°48′26″N 87°37′20″W	Grand Boulevard		
Lorraine Hansberry House	Lorraine Hansberry House	February 10, 2010	1909	6140 S. Rhodes Avenue; 41°46′58″N 87°36′44″W	Woodlawn		
Harris and Selwyn Theaters	Harris and Selwyn Theaters	March 31, 1983	1922	180-190 N. Dearborn Street; 41°53′06″N 87°37′47″W	Loop		
Haskell-Barker-Atwater Buildings	Haskell-Barker-Atwater Buildings	November 13, 1996	1875–1877; 18 S. Wabash remodeled 1896	18, 22, 28 S. Wabash Avenue; 41°52′23″N 87°37′35″W	Loop		
Hawthorne Place District	Two houses in the Hawthorne Place District	March 26, 1996	1884–1937	530-593 W. Hawthorne Place	Lake View		
Site of the Haymarket Tragedy		March 25, 1992	1886	151-199 N. Desplaines Street; 41°53′05.6″N 87°38′39″W	Near West Side		
Hazelton-Mikota House		July 27, 2005	1881	5453 N. Forest Glen Avenue; 41°58′52″N 87°45′14″W	Forest Glen		
Heald Square Monument	Heald Square Monument	September 15, 1971	1936–1941	E. Wacker Drive at N. Wabash Avenue; 41°53′14″N 87°37′36.6″W	Loop		
Heller House	Heller House	September 15, 1971	1897	5132 S. Woodlawn Avenue; 41°48′05″N 87°35′49″W	Hyde Park	March 16, 1972	August 18, 2004
Heyworth Building		August 30, 2000	1904	29 E. Madison Street; 41°52′55″N 87°37′36″W	Loop		
Hill House/ Serbian American Museum St. Sava		March 28, 2018	1902	448 W. Barry Avenue; 41°56′17.45″N 87°38′29.1″W	Lake View		
Hitchcock House		July 7, 1992	1871	5704 W. Ohio Street; 41°53′28.5″N 87°46′05″W	Austin	December 30, 1974	
Holden Block		May 4, 2011	1872	1027 W. Madison Street; 41°52′53.9″N 87°39′11.5″W	Near West Side		
Holy Trinity Orthodox Cathedral and Rectory	Holy Trinity Orthodox Cathedral viewed from the northwest with rectory visible on the right	March 21, 1979	1903	1121 N. Leavitt Street; 41°54′07.2″N 87°40′54.2″W	West Town	March 16, 1976	
Home Bank and Trust Company Building	Home Bank and Trust Buildingl viewed from the southeast	February 6, 2008	1925–1926	1200-08 N. Ashland Avenue/1600-12 W. Division Street; 41°54′13″N 87°40′04″W	West Town	February 21, 2007	
Hotel St. Benedict Flats	Hotel St. Benedict Flats viewed from the southwest	March 26, 1996	1882–1883	40-52 E. Chicago Avenue; 41°53′49″N 87°37′35″W	Near North Side	September 1, 1995	
Jane Addams Hull House	Hull House viewed from the east	June 12, 1974	1856 house 1905 dining hall	800 S. Halsted Street; 41°52′18″N 87°38′51″W	Near West Side	October 15, 1966	June 23, 1965
Humboldt Park Boathouse Pavilion	Humboldt Park Boathouse Pavilion viewed across the lagoon	November 13, 1996	1906–1907	1301 N. Humboldt Drive; 41°54′20″N 87°42′03″W	West Town	February 20, 1992	
Humboldt Park Receptory Building and Stable	Humboldt Park Receptory Building and Stable viewed from the northeast	February 6, 2008	1895–1896	3015 W. Division Street; 41°54′08″N 87°42′12″W	West Town	February 20, 1992	
Hutchinson Street District		August 31, 1977	1894–1918	600 through 900 blocks of W. Hutchinson Street	Uptown		
Hyde Park-Kenwood National Bank Building	Aerial view of the Hyde Park-Kenwood National Bank Building from the east	October 8, 2008	1928–1929	1525 E. 53rd Street; 41°47′58″N 87°35′17″W	Hyde Park		
Site of the Origins of the I&M Canal		May 9, 1996	1836-38 south canal 145-48 north canal	2800 block of S. Ashland Avenue, along the south fork of the South Branch of the Chicago River; 41°50′33″N 87°39′55″W	McKinley Park		
IBM Building (330 North Wabash)	IBM Building from across the Chicago River	February 6, 2008	1969–1972	330 N. Wabash Street; 41°53′19″N 87°37′39″W	Near North Side	March 11, 2010	
Iglehart House		July 13, 1994	1857	11118 S. Artesian Avenue; 41°41′28.2″N 87°40′57.5″W	Morgan Park		
Illinois Bell Building		January 27, 2021	1966	225 W. Randolph Street; 41°53′3.5″N 87°38′6.4″W	Loop		
Illinois Central Railroad Swing Bridge 1		December 12, 2007	1898–1900	North of 35th Street between Pulaski Road and Lawndale Avenue, Chicago Sanitary and Ship Canal; 41°49′43″N 87°42′52″W	South Lawndale		
Illinois Central Railroad Swing Bridge 2		December 12, 2007	1899–1900	North of Stevenson Expressway, East of Kedzie Avenue, Chicago Sanitary and Ship Canal; 41°49′57″N 87°42′09″W	South Lawndale		
Illinois–Indiana State Line Boundary Marker	The Illinois-Indiana State Boundary Line Marker in its original location	September 4, 2002	1838 moved 1988	S. Avenue G, near E. 103rd Street (located on the Illinois-Indiana State Boundary Line); 41°42′28″N 87°31′28″W	East Side		
Immaculata High School and Convent Buildings	Entrance to the oldest section of Immaculata High School	July 27, 1983	1922 high school 1955–1956 addition 1954–1955 convent	640 W. Irving Park Road and 4030 N. Marine Drive; 41°57′18″N 87°38′45″W	Uptown	August 30, 1977	
Indian Boundary Park Fieldhouse	Indian Boundary Park Fieldhouse	May 11, 2005	1922	2500 W. Lunt Avenue; 42°00′32″N 87°41′33″W	West Ridge	April 20, 1995	
Inland Steel Building	Inland Steel Building viewed from the west across Chase Plaza	October 7, 1998	1956–1957	30 W. Monroe Street; 41°52′52″N 87°37′45″W	Loop	February 18, 2009	
Jackson Boulevard District and Extension	Row houses in the Jackson Boulevard District	November 15, 1976; extended July 30, 1997	1879–1893	1500-blocks of W. Jackson and W. Adams Streets; 200-block of S. Ashland Avenue	Near West Side	May 19, 1978	
Jackson Park Highlands District		October 25, 1989	1905	6700-7100 blocks of S. Bennett, Constance, Cregier and Euclid Avenues; 1800–2000 blocks of W. 68th, 69th and 70th Streets	South Shore		
Jackson-Thomas House	Jackson-Thomas House	October 16, 1984	1874	7053 N. Ridge Boulevard; 42°00′37.4″N 87°40′55.4″W	Rogers Park		
Jewelers' Building	Jewelers' Building on South Wabash Avenue	December 18, 1981	1881–1882	15-17 S. Wabash Avenue; 41°52′54″N 87°37′33″W	Loop	August 7, 1974	
Jewelers Row District	The Haskell-Barker-Atwater Buildings at 20, 22 & 28 Wabash Avenue are part of the Jewelers Row District, as well as being designated Chicago Landmarks themselves.	July 9, 2003	1872–1941	N. and S. Wabash Avenue, predominantly between E. Washington and E. Monroe Streets	Loop		
Jewish People's Institute	Jewish People's Institute	June 28, 2000	1927	3500 W. Douglas Boulevard; 41°51′48″N 87°42′48″W	North Lawndale	November 15, 1978	
Site of the John and Mary Jones House		May 26, 2004	1850s–70s	Southwest corner of W. 9th Street and S. Plymouth Court; 41°52′13.5″N 87°37′43.5″W	Loop		
Johnson Publishing Company Building	Johnson Publishing Company Building	December 13, 2017	1969–1971	820 S. Michigan Avenue; 41°52′16.5″N 87°38′29.6″W	Loop		
KAM Isaiah Israel Temple	K.A.M. Isaiah Israel Temple	April 16, 1996	1924; 1926 addition	1100 E. Hyde Park Boulevard; 41°48′09.5″N 87°35′55″W	Kenwood		
Kaufmann Store and Flats		April 16, 1996	1883 south half 1887 north half	2312-14 N. Lincoln Avenue; 41°55′26″N 87°38′49.5″W	Lincoln Park		
Keck-Gottschalk-Keck Apartments		August 3, 1994	1937	5551 S. University Avenue; 41°47′36.7″N 87°35′52″W	Hyde Park		
Kenna Apartments	Kenna Apartments	September 12, 1990	1916	2214 E. 69th Street; 41°46′12″N 87°34′15″W	South Shore		
Kent House	Kent House	March 18, 1987	1883	2944 S. Michigan Avenue; 41°50′26.3″N 87°37′26″W	Douglas	November 17, 1977	
Kenwood District		June 29, 1979	1880–1920	Bounded by E. 47th and E. 51st Streets, S. Blackstone and S. Drexel Avenues	Kenwood		
Kenwood United Church of Christ	Kenwood United Church of Christ viewed from the west	October 5, 2011	1887–1888	4600-08 S. Greenwood Avenue; 41°52′53.9″N 87°39′11.5″W	Kenwood	May 16, 1991	
Kimbell Trust and Savings Bank Building		October 8, 2008	1924–1925	3600 W. Fullerton Avenue; 41°55′30″N 87°43′02″W	Logan Square		
King-Nash House	King-Nash House	February 10, 1988	1901	3234 W. Washington Boulevard; 41°52′59″N 87°42′27″W	East Garfield Park	February 10, 1983	
Krause Music Store	Front Facade of the Krause Music Store	September 28, 1977	1922	4611 N. Lincoln Avenue; 41°57′55″N 87°41′10″W	Lincoln Square	May 31, 2006	
Lake-Franklin Group		February 26, 1997	1872–1875; 1896 addition.	227-235 W. Lake Street and 173-191 N. Franklin Street; 41°53′07″N 87°38′06″W	Loop		
Lake Shore & Michigan Southern Railway Bridges	Lake Shore & Michigan Southern Railway Bridges	December 12, 2007	1912–1915	East of the Chicago Skyway and North of 98th Street, Calumet River; 41°43′11″N 87°32′34″W	East Side and South Deering		
Lakeview Avenue Row House District		November 16, 2016	1915–1917	2700–2710 N. Lakeview Avenue	Lincoln Park		
Laramie State Bank Building		June 14, 1995	1927–1929	5200 W. Chicago Avenue; 41°53′43″N 87°45′21″W	Austin		
LaSalle Street Cable Car Powerhouse		June 27, 2001	1886–1887	500 N. LaSalle Street; 41°53′28″N 87°37′59″W	Near North Side		
Lathrop House	Lathrop House viewed from the southeast	May 9, 1973	1892	120 E. Bellevue Place; 41°54′06.5″N 87°37′30″W	Near North Side	February 15, 1974	
Leiter II Building	Leiter II Building viewed from the southwest	January 14, 1997	1891	403 S. State Street; 41°52′35″N 87°37′38″W	Loop	January 7, 1976	January 7, 1976
Lincoln Avenue Row House District		November 18, 2009	1875	1928–1936 N. Lincoln Avenue; 41°52′02″N 87°38′15.5″W	Lincoln Park		
Abraham Lincoln Monument	Close up of Abraham Lincoln Monument	December 12, 2001	1887	In Lincoln Park at N. Dearborn Parkway; 41°54′45.4″N 87°37′48.9″W	Lincoln Park		
Lindblom (Robert) Technical High School	Entrance to Lindblom High School	June 9, 2010	1917–1919	6130 S. Wolcott Avenue; 41°46′55″N 87°40′19″W	West Englewood		
Lindeman & Hoverson Co. Showroom & Warehouse	Lindeman & Hoverson Co. Showroom & Warehouse	January 13, 2009	1925	2620 W. Washington Boulevard; 41°53′00″N 87°41′31″W	East Garfield Park	November 26, 2008	
Lion House	Lincoln Park Lion House	November 30, 2005	1912	Lincoln Park Zoo; 41°55′17″N 87°38′00″W	Lincoln Park		
Little Village Arch		January 26, 2022	1990	3100 West 26th Street; 41°50′41.3″N 87°42′9.8″W	South Lawndale		
Logan Square Boulevards District		November 1, 2005	1880–1930	Generally W. Logan, N. Kedzie, W. Palmer, and N. Humboldt Boulevards (north of W. Cortland St.)	Logan Square	November 20, 1985	
London Guarantee Building	London Guarantee Building viewed from across the river	April 16, 1996	1922–1923	360 N. Michigan Avenue; 41°53′16″N 87°37′30″W	Loop		
Longwood Drive District	10561 S. Longwood Drive in the Longwood Drive District	November 13, 1981	1873–1929	9800-11000 blocks of S. Longwood Drive; 10400-10700 blocks of S. Seeley Avenue	Beverly and Morgan Park		
Charles N. Loucks House	Charles N. Loucks House	October 8, 2008	1889–1891	3926 N. Keeler Avenue; 41°57′09.5″N 87°43′48″W	Irving Park	February 9, 1984	
Ludington Building	Ludington Building at Columbia College Chicago	June 10, 1996	1891	1104 S. Wabash Avenue; 41°52′08″N 87°37′05″W	Loop	May 8, 1980	
Ludlow Typograph Company Building		April 27, 2022	1913–1948	2028-2062 N. Clybourn Avenue; 41°55′6.0″N 87°39′37.1″W	Lincoln Park		
Madlener House		March 22, 1973	1902	4 W. Burton Place; 41°54′34.5″N 87°37′45″W	Near North Side	October 15, 1970	
Madonna Della Strada Chapel		November 3, 2004	1938–1939	6453 N. Sheridan Road; 41°59′58″N 87°39′23″W	Rogers Park		
Main Building and Machinery Hall, Illinois Institute of Technology	Main Building, Illinois Institute of Technology	May 26, 2004	1891–1893	3300-20 S. Federal Street; 41°50′03″N 87°37′45″W; 100 W. 33rd Street; 41°50′05″N 87°37′45″W	Douglas	August 12, 2005	
Majestic Building and Theater		May 11, 2005	1906	22 W. Monroe Street; 41°52′51″N 87°37′43″W	Loop		
Manhattan Building	The Manhattan Building (right) is the oldest surviving skyscraper in the world to use a purely skeletal supporting structure.	July 7, 1978	1891	431 S. Dearborn Street; 41°52′34″N 87°37′44″W	Loop	March 16, 1976	
Marina City		February 2, 2016	1964–1968	300 N. State Street; 41°53′18.7″N 87°37′43.5″W	Near North Side		
Marquette Building	The Marquette Building was recently restored by the John D. and Catherine T. MacArthur Foundation.	June 9, 1975	1895	140 S. Dearborn Street; 41°52′47″N 87°37′47″W	Loop	August 17, 1973	January 7, 1976
Marquette Park State Bank (Former)	Marquette Park State Bank (Former)	October 8, 2008	1924	6314 S. Western Avenue; 41°46′44.3″N 87°41′1.5″W	Chicago Lawn		
Marshall Field and Company Building		November 1, 2005	1892, 1902, 1906, 1907, 1914	111 N. State Street; 41°53′02″N 87°37′37″W	Loop	June 2, 1978	June 2, 1978
Marshfield Trust and Savings Bank (Former)		October 8, 2008	1924	3325 N. Lincoln Avenue; 41°56′33.0″N 87°40′13.0″W	Lake View		
Mather Tower		March 7, 2001	1928	75 E. Wacker Drive; 41°53′15.5″N 87°37′31.5″W	Loop		
McCormick Double House		October 6, 2005	1875	660 N. Rush Street; 41°53′39.5″N 87°37′33″W	Near North Side		
McCormick Row House District		May 4, 1977	1882–1889	800-block of W. Chalmers Place; 832-58 W. Belden Avenue; 833-927 W. Fullerton Avenue	Lincoln Park		
John A. McGill House	John A. McGill House	April 26, 2006	1891	4938 S. Drexel Boulevard; 41°48′17.5″N 87°36′17″W	Kenwood		
McGraw-Hill Building		February 7, 1997	1928–1929	520 N. Michigan Avenue; 41°53′29″N 87°37′28″W	Near North Side		
Medinah Temple		June 27, 2001	1912	600 N. Wabash Avenue; 41°53′34″N 87°37′38″W	Near North Side		
John and Clara Merchant House		October 8, 2008	1872	3854 N. Kostner Avenue; 41°57′6.0″N 87°44′18.3″W	Irving Park		
Metropolitan Apostolic Community Church Building		July 19, 2007	1888–1890; 1913 addition	4100 S. Dr. Martin Luther King Jr. Drive; 41°49′12.8″N 87°37′3.2″W	Grand Boulevard		
Metropolitan Missionary Baptist Church		February 16, 1989	1901	2151 W. Washington Boulevard; 41°52′58.6″N 87°40′52.3″W	Near West Side		
Michigan Avenue Bridge and Esplanade	The Michigan Avenue Bridge was once the main link of the North and South sides of Chicago across the Chicago River.	October 2, 1991	1920 bridge and bridge house esplanade	Chicago River, between N. Michigan and S. Wabash Avenues; 41°53′21.6″N 87°37′27.5″W	Loop and Near North Side		
Historic Michigan Boulevard District		February 27, 2002	1882–1930	N-S Michigan Avenue, between E. 11th and E. Randolph Streets	Loop		
Mid-City Trust and Savings Bank		April 24, 2012	1911–1912	2 S. Halsted Street/801 W. Madison Street; 41°52′53.8″N 87°38′51.7″W	Near West Side		
Mid-North District		August 31, 1977		Bounded by Fullerton Avenue, Armitage Avenue, Lincoln Avenue and Clark Street	Lincoln Park		
Mid-North District Extension		September 29, 2004		Cobden Apartments: 418-24 W. Belden Avenue/2300-24 N. Clark Street; Benson Apartments: 428-38 W. Belden Avenue	Lincoln Park		
Miller House		December 1, 1993	1915	7121 S. Paxton Avenue; 41°45′56.3″N 87°34′15.9″W	South Shore	August 23, 1991	
Milwaukee Avenue District		April 9, 2008	1870–1929	Predominantly the 1200–1600 blocks of N. Milwaukee Avenue, the 1500-block of N. Damen Avenue, and the 1900–2000- blocks of W. North Avenue	West Town		
Milwaukee-Diversey-Kimball District		February 9, 2005	1922–1930	Generally at the intersection of Milwaukee, Diversey, and Kimball Avenues	Logan Square and Avondale		
The Miracle House		April 21, 2021	1954	2001 N. Nordica Avenue; 41°54′59.9″N 87°48′7.0″W	Austin		
Monadnock Block	The Monadnock Building is one of the tallest masonry load-bearing wall structures in the world.	November 14, 1973	1889–1891 north half 1891–1893 south half	53 W. Jackson Boulevard; 41°52′39.6″N 87°37′46.4″W	Loop	November 20, 1970	
Monastery of the Holy Cross		October 14, 2021	1901	3101-11 S. Aberdeen Street; 41°51′43.6″N 87°39′14.2″W	Bridgeport		
Montgomery Ward & Co. Catalog House		May 17, 2000	1907–1908	600-618 W. Chicago Avenue; 41°53′59.8″N 87°38′35.6″W	Near North Side	June 2, 1978	June 2, 1978
Monumental Baptist Church of Chicago		September 21, 2022	1899–1901	729 E. Oakwood Boulevard; 41°49′21.2″N 87°36′30.1″W	Grand Boulevard		
Morton Salt Company Warehouse Complex	Morton Salt Company Warehouse Complex	June 25, 2021	1930	1357 North Elston Avenue; 41°54′23.9″N 87°39′33.8″W	West Town		
John Lothrop Motley School	John Lothrop Motley School	November 16, 2016	1884, 1898 addition	739 N. Ada Street; 41°53′44.0″N 87°39′40.0″W	West Town		
Motor Row District		December 13, 2000		1444, 1454, 1737, 1925, 2000 S. Michigan Avenue, 2200–2500 blocks of S. Michigan Avenue, 2246-3453 S. Indiana Avenue, and 2211-47 S. Wabash Avenue	Near South Side	November 18, 2002	
Mt. Pisgah Missionary Baptist Church Complex	Mt. Pisgah Missionary Baptist Church Complex	April 24, 2020	1912	4600-28 S. Dr. Martin Luther King Jr. Drive; 41°48′38.2″N 87°37′1.6″W	Grand Boulevard		
Muddy Waters House	Muddy Waters House	October 14, 2021	1891	4339 S. Lake Park Avenue; 41°48′57.9″N 87°35′52.3″W	Kenwood		
(Former) James Mulligan Public School Building		April 2, 2014	1890	1855-63 N. Sheffield Avenue; 41°54′55.9″N 87°39′10.5″W	Lincoln Park		
Mundelein College Skyscraper Building		December 13, 2006	1930–1931	1020 W. Sheridan Road; 42°0′5.2″N 87°39′21.8″W	Rogers Park	May 31, 1980	
Municipal Tuberculosis Sanitarium Complex	Municipal Tuberculosis Sanitarium Complex	March 13, 2019	1911–1915	5801 N. Pulaski Road; 41°59′1.8″N 87°43′20.8″W	North Park		
Museum of Science and Industry	The Museum of Science and Industry building once housed the Field Museum of Natural History.	November 1, 1995	1891–1893; 1929–1930 reconstruction 1930–1941 interior renovation	57th Street at Lake Shore Drive; 41°47′26.5″N 87°34′59.2″W	Hyde Park		
Mutual Insurance Building		January 10, 2013	1921; 1926–1927 top four floors added	4750 N. Sheridan Road; 41°58′8.0″N 87°39′18.9″W	Uptown		
Navy Pier Headhouse and Auditorium	Navy Pier was built as part of the 1909 Plan of Chicago.	November 14, 1977	1916	Grand Avenue and Streeter Drive at Lake Michigan; 41°53′32.2″N 87°36′36.2″W	Near North Side	September 13, 1979	
Charles M. Netterstrom House		February 1, 2017	1872–1874	833 W. Aldine Avenue; 41°56′30.1″N 87°39′2.4″W	Lake View		
New Regal Theater		June 17, 1992	1926–1927	1641 E. 79th Street; 41°45′5.58″N 87°35′2.7″W	South Chicago		
New York Life Insurance Building		July 26, 2006; May 13, 2009 Amendment	1893–1894; 1898 east addition 1903 top floor	37-43 S. LaSalle Street; 41°52′24.0″N 87°37′54.6″W	Loop		
Newport Avenue District		February 9, 2005	1891–1928	Newport Avenue, between Halsted and Clark Streets	Lake View		
Richard Nickel Studio		June 9, 2010	1889	1810 W. Cortland Street; 41°54′58.9″N 87°40′23.7″W	Logan Square		
Nickerson House		September 28, 1977	1883	40 E. Erie Street; 41°53′40.1″N 87°37′35.8″W	Near North Side	November 7, 1976	
Noble-Seymour-Crippen House		May 11, 1988	1833; 1863 addition	5624 N. Newark Avenue; 41°59′0.9″N 87°47′45.1″W	Norwood Park	August 10, 2000	
North Chicago Hospital Building		May 13, 2009	1928–1929	2551 N. Clark Street; 41°55′46.1″N 87°38′32.6″W	Lincoln Park		
North Kenwood District		June 9, 1993	1875–1920	4500-block of S. Berkeley Avenue, as well as surrounding historic structures in an area bounded by E. 43rd Street, E. 47th Street, S. Cottage Grove Avenue, and the Illinois Central Railroad tracks.	Kenwood		
Northwestern University Chicago Campus District		September 10, 2014	1926	303-361 E. Chicago Avenue	Near North Side		
Northwestern University Settlement House		December 1, 1993	1921	1400 W. Augusta Boulevard; 41°54′0.8″N 87°39′46.0″W	West Town		
Site of First Self-Sustaining Nuclear Chain Reaction		October 27, 1971	1942; 1967 sculpture erected	5600 block of S. Ellis Avenue; 41°47′36.1″N 87°36′5.0″W	Hyde Park	October 15, 1966	February 18, 1965
John Nuveen House		January 15, 2020	1892	3916 N. Tripp Avenue; 41°57′9.0″N 87°44′3.8″W	Irving Park		
Oakdale Avenue District		March 29, 2006	1890–1927	800 Block of W. Oakdale Avenue between Halsted Street and Mildred Avenue	Lake View		
Oakland District		March 25, 1992	1872–1905	4100 block of S. Berkeley Avenue, as well as surrounding historic structures in an area bounded by 35th Street, 43rd Streets, Cottage Grove Avenue, and the Illinois Central Railroad tracks	Oakland		
Old Chicago Coast Guard Station		December 12, 2007	1936	Lake Michigan near the mouth of the Chicago River; 41°53′15.4″N 87°36′37.0″W	Near North Side		
Old Chicago Main Post Office Building	Old Chicago Main Post Office Building	March 28, 2018	1921, 1934	433 West Van Buren Street; 41°52′36.5″N 87°38′18.0″W	Near West Side		
Old Chicago Water Tower District	The Chicago Avenue Pumping Station is also a historical district contributing property in the Old Chicago Water Tower District.	October 6, 1971	1869	Both sides of N. Michigan Avenue, between E. Chicago Avenue and E. Pearson Street	Near North Side	April 23, 1975	
Old Colony Building	Old Colony Building	July 7, 1978	1894	407 S. Dearborn Street; 41°52′36.3″N 87°37′44.8″W	Loop	January 2, 1976	
Old Dearborn Bank Building	Old Dearborn Bank Building (203 N. Wabash Ave.)	June 4, 2003	1928	203 N. Wabash Avenue; 41°53′10.4″N 87°37′33.7″W	Loop		
Old Edgebrook District	Houses along McClellan Avenue at Lundy Avenue in the Old Edgebrook District	December 14, 1988	1894	Bounded by N. Central and N. Devon Avenues, the North Branch of the Chicago River, and the Edgebrook Golf Course	Forest Glen		
Old Republic Building		December 8, 2010	1924	307 N. Michigan Avenue; 41°53′13.9″N 87°37′27.3″W	Loop		
Old Town Triangle District	Old Town banner	September 28, 1977	1871–1900	Bounded by N. Lincoln Avenue, W. North Avenue, N. Wells Street, and the former Ogden right-of-way	Lincoln Park	November 8, 1984	
Oliver Building		May 9, 1984	1870; 1920 top two floors	159 N. Dearborn Street; 41°53′5.8″N 87°37′45.5″W	Loop	December 8, 1983	
On Leong Merchants Association Building		December 1, 1993	1926–1927	2216 S. Wentworth Avenue; 41°51′9.2″N 87°37′56.3″W	Armour Square		
One North LaSalle Building		April 16, 1996	1929–1930	1 N. LaSalle Street; 41°52′56.9″N 87°37′55.4″W	Loop	November 22, 1999	
Oppenheimer-Goldblatt Bros. Department Store Building	Oppenheimer-Goldblatt Bros. Department Store Building	May 8, 2013	1915	4700 S. Ashland Avenue; 41°48′30.6″N 87°40′3.5″W	New City		
Overton Hygienic Building		September 9, 1998	1922–1923	3619-27 S. State Street; 41°49′45.0″N 87°37′34.3″W	Douglas	April 30, 1986	
Page Brothers Building		January 28, 1983	1872	177-91 N. State Street; 41°53′7.9″N 87°37′37.9″W	Loop	June 5, 1975	
Palliser's Cottage Home No. 35		February 16, 2000	1882	2314 W. 111th Place; 41°41′28.4″N 87°40′46.0″W	Morgan Park		
Palmer House Hotel		December 13, 2006	1925–1927	17 E. Monroe Street; 41°52′49.3″N 87°37′32.4″W	Loop		
Palmolive Building		February 16, 2000	1927–1929	919 N. Michigan Avenue; 41°53′59.8″N 87°37′24.8″W	Near North Side	August 21, 2003	
Elizabeth Palmer Peabody School	Elizabeth Palmer Peabody School	November 16, 2016	1894	1438–1454 W. Augusta Boulevard; 41°54′0.6″N 87°39′50.5″W	West Town		
Paseo Boricua Gateway Flags	Paseo Boricua Gateway Flags	September 21, 2022	1995	West Division Street at Artesian Avenue [2400-West] and Mozart Street [2800-West] 41°54′10.7″N 87°41′18.6″W	Humboldt Park		
Pate-Comiskey House	Pate-Comiskey House	October 1, 2003	1901	5131 S. Michigan Avenue; 41°48′4.4″N 87°37′20.1″W	Washington Park		
Pennsylvania Railroad Bridge		December 12, 2007	1914	Near 19th Street, East of Lumber Street, South Branch of the Chicago River; 41°51′22.3″N 87°38′13.2″W	Armour Square and Lower West Side		
Pennsylvania Railroad "Eight Track" Bridge		December 12, 2007	1901–1910	South of 31st Street, West of Western Avenue, Chicago Sanitary and Ship Canal; 41°50′15.5″N 87°41′14.8″W	Lower West Side and South Lawndale		
Pentecostal Church of Holiness		May 26, 2021	1931–1932	4208 W. 15th Street; 41°51′39.7″N 87°43′49.0″W	North Lawndale		
Peoples Gas Irving Park Neighborhood Store		March 18, 1987	1926	4839 W. Irving Park Road; 41°57′12.2″N 87°44′56.0″W	Portage Park		
Peoples Gas South Chicago Neighborhood Store		April 16, 1996	1925	8935 S. Commercial Avenue; 41°43′57.9″N 87°33′3.6″W	South Chicago		
Perkins-Nordine House	Perkins-Nordine House	January 27, 2021	1902–1903	6106 N. Kenmore Avenue; 41°59′33.9″N 87°39′25.9″W	Edgewater		
Perkins, Fellows & Hamilton Office and Studio		December 1, 1993	1917	814 N. Michigan Avenue; 41°53′50.563″N 87°37′27.657″W	Near North Side		
Henry V. Peters House		May 5, 2004	1906	4731 N. Knox Avenue; 41°58′2.9″N 87°44′37.6″W	Irving Park		
Wendell Phillips High School		May 7, 2003	1904	244 E. Pershing Road; 41°49′29.689″N 87°37′11.078″W	Douglas		
Pilgrim Baptist Church		December 18, 1981	1890–1891	3301 S. Indiana Avenue; 41°50′4.6″N 87°37′17.5″W	Douglas	April 26, 1973	
Pioneer Trust and Savings Bank Building		June 6, 2012	1924–1926	4000 W. North Avenue; 41°54′37.0″N 87°43′35.8″W	Humboldt Park		
Pittsfield Building		November 6, 2002	1927	55 E. Washington Street; 41°52′59.8″N 87°37′33.0″W	Loop		
Plymouth Building		November 16, 2016	1899, 1945 facade renovation	417 S. Dearborn Street; 41°52′35.4″N 87°37′44.40″W	Loop		
Polish National Alliance Building	Polish National Alliance Building	November 5, 2014	1937– 1938	1514-1520 W. Division Street; 41°54′12.2″N 87°40′1.3″W	West Town		
Portage Park Theatre		March 7, 2013	1920	4042-60 N. Milwaukee Avenue; 4905-15 W. Cuyler Avenue; 41°57′16.1″N 87°44′56.5″W	Portage Park		
Powhatan Apartments		January 12, 1993	1927–1929	4950 S. Chicago Beach Drive; 41°48′16.7″N 87°35′4.2″W	Kenwood		
Prairie Avenue District		December 27, 1979		1800 and 1900-blocks of S. Prairie Avenue, 1800-block of S. Indiana Avenue, and 211-217 E. Cullerton Street	Near South Side	November 15, 1972	
Printing House Row District		May 9, 1996		500- through 800-blocks of S. Dearborn Street, S. Federal Street and S. Plymouth Court	Loop	January 7, 1976	January 7, 1976
Promontory Apartments	Promontory Apartments	November 20, 2019	1946–1949	5530-5532 S. Shore Drive; 41°47′40.4″N 87°34′50.6″W	Hyde Park		
Promontory Point		April 19, 2023		East of S. Jean-Baptiste Pointe DuSable Lake Shore Drive, Between 54th and 56th Streets; 41°47′46.2″N 87°34′37.3″W	Hyde Park		
Pulaski Park Fieldhouse		July 29, 2003	1912–1914	1419 W. Blackhawk Street; 41°54′25.1″N 87°39′47.9″W	West Town	August 13, 1981	
Pullman District		October 16, 1972 (South section); June 9, 1993 (North section)		Roughly bounded by E. 104th Street, E. 115th Street, S. Cottage Grove Avenue and S. Langley Street	Pullman	October 8, 1969	December 30, 1970
Quincy Elevated Station	Quincy Elevated Station	November 21, 2017	1895–1897	220 S. Wells Street; 41°52′44.1″N 87°38′1.7″W	Loop		
Quinn Chapel		August 13, 1977	1892	2401 S. Wabash Avenue; 41°50′57.2″N 87°37′30.3″W	Near South Side	September 4, 1979	
Raber House	Raber House	April 16, 1996	1870, alterations 1894	5760 S. Lafayette Avenue; 41°47′21.7″N 87°37′37.2″W	Washington Park		
Race House		September 22, 1988	1874	3945 N. Tripp Avenue; 41°57′11.7″N 87°44′1.1″W	Irving Park		
Rainbow Pylons and the Legacy Walk	Rainbow Pylons and the Legacy Walk	July 24, 2019	1997	3244-3710 North Halsted Street (evens) and 3243-3711 North Halsted Street (odds); 41°56′29.3″N 87°38′58.2″W	Lake View		
Rath House		December 1, 1993	1907	2703 W. Logan Boulevard; 41°55′41.1″N 87°41′43.4″W	Logan Square		
Reebie Storage Warehouse		September 1, 1999	1921–1922	2325-33 N. Clark Street; 41°55′29.4″N 87°38′22.2″W	Lincoln Park	March 21, 1979	
Harriet F. Rees House		March 14, 2012	1888	2110 S. Prairie Avenue; 41°51′14.8″N 87°37′15.7″W	Near South Side	May 22, 2007	
Reid, Murdoch & Co. Building		November 15, 1976	1914	320 N. Clark Street; 41°53′17.5″N 87°37′52.3″W	Near North Side	August 28, 1975	
Reliance Building		July 11, 1995	Base built in 1890, Upper stories built 1894–1895	32 N. State Street; 41°52′59.6″N 87°37′41.8″W	Loop	October 15, 1970	January 7, 1976
Riviera Motor Sales Company Building		June 6, 2012	1925–1926	5948-60 N. Broadway; 41°59′27.1″N 87°39′38.1″W	Edgewater		
Roanoke Building and Tower		December 12, 2007	1915–1925	11 S. LaSalle Street; 41°52′54.2″N 87°37′55.6″W	Loop	December 6, 2007	
Roberts Temple Church of God in Christ Building	Roberts Temple Church of God in Christ	March 29, 2006	1922–1927	4021 S. State Street; 41°49′16.9″N 87°37′33.6″W	Grand Boulevard		
Robie House	The Robie House is a Frank Lloyd Wright design.	September 15, 1971	1909	5757 S. Woodlawn Avenue; 41°47′24.0″N 87°35′45.6″W	Hyde Park	October 15, 1966	November 27, 1963
Rockefeller Memorial Chapel	Rockefeller Memorial Chapel	November 3, 2004	1925–1928	1156–1180 E. 59th Street; 41°47′16.6″N 87°35′52.6″W	Hyde Park		
Roloson Houses		December 27, 1979	1894	3213-19 S. Calumet Avenue; 41°50′10.7″N 87°37′4.3″W	Douglas	June 30, 1977	
Rookery Building		July 5, 1972	1885–1888, lobby remodeled 1905–1907	209 S. LaSalle Street; 41°52′45.1″N 87°37′54.1″W	Loop	April 17, 1970	May 15, 1975
Rosehill Cemetery Entrance		October 16, 1980	1864	5800 N. Ravenswood Avenue; 41°59′11.9″N 87°40′30.6″W	Lincoln Square	April 24, 1975	
Rosenwald Court Apartments	Rosenwald Court Apartments	November 8, 2017	1929–30	4600-4658 S. Michigan Avenue; 4601- 4659 S. Wabash Avenue; 45-77 E. 46th Street; 46-78 E. 47th Street; 41°48′34.5″N 87°37′24.5″W	Grand Boulevard		
Carl Sandburg House		October 4, 2006	circa 1886	4646 N. Hermitage Avenue; 41°58′0.3″N 87°40′22.4″W	Uptown		
Wigwam (Site of the Sauganash Hotel)	The Wigwam Building/Sauganash Hotel Chicago Landmark plaque	November 6, 2002		Lake Street and Market (now Wacker Drive); 41°53′9.5″N 87°38′13.2″W	Loop		
Schlect House		January 20, 1999	1887	5804 W. Race Avenue; 41°53′25.9″N 87°46′13.1″W	Austin		
Schlitz Brewery Stable Building on Front (Former)		July 6, 2011	1906	11314 S. Front Avenue; 41°41′19.6″N 87°36′43.4″W	Roseland		
Schlitz Brewery Tied-House on 69th (Former)		July 6, 2011	1898	958 W. 69th Street; 41°46′9.1″N 87°38′57.1″W	Englewood		
Schlitz Brewery Tied-House on Belmont (Former)		July 6, 2011	1903–1904	2159 W. Belmont Avenue; 41°56′22.1″N 87°40′59″W	North Center		
Schlitz Brewery Tied-House on Ewing (Former)	Schlitz Brewery-Tied House on Ewing (Former)	October 7, 2020	1907	9401 S. Ewing Avenue; 41°43′32.9″N 87°32′15.8″W	East Side		
Schlitz Brewery Tied-House on Front (Former)		July 6, 2011	1906	11400 S. Front Avenue; 41°41′20.6″N 87°36′41.6″W	Roseland		
Schlitz Brewery Tied-House on Oakley (Former)		October 5, 2011	1898	1944 N. Oakley Avenue; 41°55′3.6″N 87°41′6.5″W	Logan Square		
Schlitz Brewery Tied-House on Western (Former)		July 6, 2011	1899	3456 S. Western Avenue; 41°49′50.1″N 87°41′7.2″W	McKinley Park		
Schlitz Brewery-Tied House on Broadway (Former)		May 4, 2011	1904, 1908	5120 N. Broadway; 41°58′31.6″N 87°39′36.7″W	Uptown		
Schlitz Brewery-Tied House on Division (Former)		May 4, 2011	1900–1901	1801 W. Division Street; 41°54′11.4″N 87°40′20.9″W	West Town		
Schlitz Brewery-Tied House on Lake (Former)	Schlitz Brewery-Tied House on Lake (Former)	July 21, 2021	1892	1393-1399 W. Lake Street; 41°53′7.3″N 87°39′44.3″W	Near West Side		
Schlitz Brewery-Tied House on Southport (Former)		July 6, 2011	1903	3159 N. Southport Avenue; 41°56′23.2″N 87°39′48.2″W	Lake View		
Adolf Schmidt House		April 4, 2013	1917	6331-33 N. Sheridan Road; 41°59′51.0″N 87°39′18.6″W	Edgewater		
Martin Schnitzius Cottage		December 6, 2012	1891	1925 N. Fremont Street; 41°55′0.9″N 87°39′2.7″W	Lincoln Park	January 11, 1976	
F. R. Schock House		January 20, 1999	1886	5804 W. Midway Park; 41°53′21.4″N 87°46′13″W	Austin		
Marie Schock House		January 20, 1999	1888	5749 W. Race Avenue; 41°53′23.5″N 87°46′11″W	Austin		
Schoenhofen Brewery		July 13, 1988	Administration Building 1886, Powerhouse 1902	18th Street and Canalport Avenue; 41°51′28.2″N 87°38′24.0″W	Lower West Side	December 27, 1978	
Schurz High School		December 7, 1979	1910	3601 N. Milwaukee Avenue; 41°56′51.3″N 87°44′7.0″W	Irving Park		
Sears, Roebuck and Co. District		March 18, 2015	1904–1916	Bounded by S. Homan Avenue, W Arthington Street, S. Spaulding Avenue, and Baltimore and Ohio Railroad viaduct	North Lawndale		
Sears, Roebuck and Company Administration Building		September 4, 2002	1905–1914	3333 W. Arthington Street; 41°52′11.3″N 87°42′34.8″W	North Lawndale	June 2, 1978	June 2, 1978
Second Presbyterian Church		September 28, 1977	1874, reconstructed in 1900	1936 S. Michigan Avenue; 41°51′21.2″N 87°37′27.9″W	Near South Side	December 27, 1974	February 27, 2013
Seth Warner House		February 23, 2022	1869	631 N. Central Avenue; 41°53′32″N 87°45′53.6″W	Austin	June 3, 1982	
Seven Houses on Lake Shore Drive District		June 28, 1989	1889–1917	1250-60 and 1516-30 N. Lake Shore Drive	Near North Side		
Sexton School		June 7, 1978	1882	160 W. Wendell Street; 41°54′6.3″N 87°38′1.7″W	Near North Side		
Shedd Park Fieldhouse		February 11, 2004	1917, Gymnasium Addition 1928	3669 W. 23rd Street; 41°51′1.0″N 87°43′10.7″W	South Lawndale	December 30, 1974	
Sheridan Trust and Savings Bank Building		October 8, 2008	1924–1925, four-story addition 1928	4753 N. Broadway; 41°58′8.3″N 87°39′32.8″W	Uptown		
Shoreland Hotel		September 8, 2010	1925–1926	5454 S. Shore Drive; 41°47′47.6″N 87°34′54.0″W	Hyde Park	May 14, 1986	
Soldiers' Home		April 16, 1996	Built in phases between 1864 and 1923	739 E. 35th Street; 41°49′53.2″N 87°36′28.4″W	Oakland		
South Pond Refectory; Men's and Ladies' Comfort Station		February 5, 2003	Comfort Station 1888, Refectory 1908	2021 N. Stockton Drive; 41°55′9.4″N 87°38′2.0″W; 2019 N. Stockton Drive; 41°55′8.5″N 87°38′2.9″W	Lincoln Park	November 20, 1986	
South Shore Cultural Center		May 26, 2004	1916	7059 S. South Shore Drive; 41°46′10.2″N 87°33′48.7″W	South Shore	March 4, 1975	
South Side Community Art Center		June 16, 1994	1892–1893, remodeled 1940	3831 S. Michigan Avenue; 41°49′29.2″N 87°37′21.9″W	Douglas		
South Side Trust & Savings Bank Building		July 9, 2008	1922	4659 S. Cottage Grove Avenue; 41°48′35.6″N 87°36′21.9″W	Kenwood		
Spiegel Administration Building		May 4, 2011	1936, four floor addition 1941–1942	1038 W. 35th Street; 41°49′52.1″N 87°39′7.3″W	Bridgeport		
St. Charles Air Line Bridge		December 12, 2007	1917–1919	North of 16th Street and East of Lumber Street, South Branch of the Chicago River; 41°51′40.9″N 87°38′4.5″W	Near South Side and Near West Side		
St. Gelasius Church Building	St. Gelasius Church	January 14, 2004	1923–1928	6401-09 S. Woodlawn Avenue; 41°46′42.9″N 87°35′44.1″W	Woodlawn		
St. Ignatius College Prep Building		March 18, 1987	1869, West addition 1874	1076 W. Roosevelt Road; 41°52′3.5″N 87°39′14.5″W	Near West Side	November 17, 1977	
St. Peter's Church and Parish House		October 31, 2018	1895, 1926	615-623 West Belmont Avenue; 41°56′23.9″N 87°38′42.5″W	Lake View		
Statue of The Republic	Statue of the Republic commemorates the 1893 World's Columbian Exposition.	June 4, 2003	1918	Jackson Park, at the intersection of Hayes and Richards Drives; 41°46′48.8″N 87°34′46.9″W	Woodlawn		
Steger Building		April 4, 2013	1911	28 E. Jackson Boulevard; 41°52′42.7″N 87°37′35.4″W	Loop	November 27, 1998	
Steuben Club Building		July 26, 2006	1929	188 W. Randolph Street; 41°53′6.1″N 87°38′0.2″W	Loop	May 22, 2007	
Graeme Stewart Elementary School		November 16, 2016	1907	4505-4545 N. Kenmore Avenue; 41°57′54.8″N 87°39′22.0″W	Uptown		
Stock Yards National Bank Building		October 8, 2008	1925	4150 S. Halsted Street; 41°49′8.4″N 87°38′47.0″W	North Lawndale		
Stone Temple Baptist Church Building		June 22, 2016	1926	3622 W. Douglas Boulevard; 41°51′48.0″N 87°42′58.8″W	North Lawndale		
Sunset Cafe		September 9, 1998	1909, remodeled 1921	315 E. 35th Street; 41°49′51.7″N 87°37′7.1″W	Douglas		
Supreme Life Building		September 9, 1998	1921, remodeled 1950	3501 S. Dr. Martin Luther King Jr. Drive; 41°49′52.0″N 87°37′0.1″W	Douglas		
Surf-Pine Grove District		July 19, 2007		Predominantly 400- and 500-Blocks of W. Surf Street and 2800-Block of N. Pine Grove Avenue	Lake View		
Swedish American State Bank Building		July 9, 2008	1913	5400 N. Clark Street; 41°58′48.6″N 87°40′6.8″W	Edgewater		
Lorado Taft's Midway Studios		December 1, 1993		6016 S. Ingleside Avenue; 41°47′8.4″N 87°36′11.3″W	Woodlawn	October 15, 1966	December 21, 1965
Terra Cotta Row District		September 14, 2005		Four buildings and decorative wall located at Oakdale and Seminary Avenues	Lake View		
Thalia Hall		October 25, 1989	1892	1215-25 W. 18th Street; 41°51′28.1″N 87°39′27.1″W	Lower West Side		
Theurer-Wrigley House		August 10, 1979		2466 N. Lakeview Avenue; 41°55′39.8″N 87°38′22.3″W	Lincoln Park	July 28, 1980	
Third Unitarian Church		February 6, 2008		301 N. Mayfield Avenue; 41°53′9.7″N 87°46′17.7″W	Austin		
Three Arts Club		June 10, 1981	1914	1300 N. Dearborn Street; 41°54′22.2″N 87°37′49.8″W	Near North Side		
Emmett and Mamie Till-Mobley House		January 27, 2021	1895	6427 S. Saint Lawrence Avenue; 41°46′40.4″N 87°36′37.5″W	Woodlawn		
Tree Studios, Annexes, and Courtyard		State Street building, February 26, 1997; Ohio Street and Ontario Street annexes and courtyard, June 27, 2001	State Street building 1894, Ohio Street annex 1912, Ontario Street annex 1913	601-623 N. State Street, 4-10 E. Ohio Street and 3-7 E. Ontario Street; 41°53′34.0″N 87°37′40.8″W	Near North Side	December 16, 1974	
Tribune Tower	The Gothic Revival Tribune Tower in Chicago	February 1, 1989	1922–1925	435 N. Michigan Avenue; 41°53′26.6″N 87°37′24.1″W	Near North Side		
Truevine Missionary Baptist Church Building		February 7, 2007		6720 S. Stewart Avenue; 41°46′19.6″N 87°38′6.9″W	Englewood		
Lyman Trumbull Public School Building (Former)		September 18, 2019	1908–1909	5200 N. Ashland Avenue; 41°58′36.9″N 87°40′12.2″W	Edgewater		
Trustees System Service Building		January 14, 2004	1929–1930	201 N. Wells Street; 41°53′10.1″N 87°38′1.3″W	Loop	September 3, 1998	
Turzak House		December 9, 1992		7059 N. Olcott Avenue; 42°0′35.0″N 87°48′47.9″W	Edison Park		
Ukrainian Village District		December 4, 2002, extended July 27, 2005 and April 11, 2007		Portions of the area bounded by W. Chicago Avenue, N. Damen Avenue, W. Division Street, and N. Western Avenue	West Town		
Union Park Hotel		June 9, 2010	1929–1930	1519–1521 W. Warren Boulevard; 41°52′56.1″N 87°39′58.1″W	Near West Side		
Union Station		May 1, 2002		210 S. Canal Street; 41°52′43.0″N 87°38′22.6″W	Near West Side		
Union Stock Yard Gate		February 24, 1972		W. Exchange Avenue and S. Peoria Street; 41°49′8.0″N 87°38′54.6″W	New City	December 27, 1972	May 29, 1981
Unity Hall		September 9, 1998		3140 S. Indiana Avenue; 41°50′14.2″N 87°37′20.1″W	Douglas	April 30, 1986	
Uptown Square District		December 14, 2016	1901–1939	North Broadway between Lawrence and Wilson Avenues; Lawrence Avenue between Broadway and Sheridan Road	Uptown		
Uptown Theatre		October 2, 1991		4816 N. Broadway; 41°58′10.8″N 87°39′36.1″W	Uptown	November 20, 1986	
Vassar Swiss Underwear Company Building		July 30, 2008		2543-45 W. Diversey Avenue; 41°55′56.0″N 87°41′31.4″W	Logan Square	September 17, 2008	
Veseman Building		December 12, 2007	c. 1880 (original two-story building), 1930 (new façade & third-floor addition)	442-444 N. LaSalle Street; 41°53′13.7″N 87°37′56.8″W	Near North Side		
Victory Monument	Victory Monument is one of 9 Chicago Landmarks and 6 National Register of Historic Places listings in the Bronzeville neighborhood.	September 9, 1998		E. 35th Street and S. Dr. Martin Luther King Jr. Drive; 41°49′50.0″N 87°37′1.7″W	Douglas	April 30, 1986	
Villa District		November 23, 1983		3600 through 3800-blocks of N. Avers, Hamlin, Harding and Springfield Avenues	Irving Park	September 11, 1979	
Village Theatre		May 13, 2009	1915–1916	1546-50 N. Clark Street; 41°54′39.4″N 87°37′54.8″W	Near North Side		
Vorwaerts Turner Hall		November 18, 2009		2431-33 W. Roosevelt Road; 41°51′59.5″N 87°41′14.5″W	Near West Side		
Wabash Avenue YMCA		September 9, 1998		3763 S. Wabash Avenue; 41°49′32.7″N 87°37′27.8″W	Douglas	April 30, 1986	
Waller Apartments		March 2, 1994		2840-58 W. Walnut Street; 41°53′8.9″N 87°41′53.0″W	East Garfield Park		
Walser House		March 30, 1984		42 N. Central Avenue; 41°52′54.0″N 87°45′55.2″W	Austin	April 23, 2013	
James Ward Public School		September 14, 2005	1910	2703 S. Shields Avenue; 41°50′38.9″N 87°38′7.7″W	Armour Square		
The Warehouse		June 21, 2023		206 S. Jefferson Street; 41°52′45.4″N 87°38′34.1″W	Near West Side		
Augustus Warner House		September 5, 2013		1337 N. Dearborn Street; 41°54′25.3″N 87°37′47.2″W	Near North Side	January 30, 1978	
Washington Block		January 14, 1997	1873–1874	40 N. Wells Street; 41°52′59.0″N 87°38′2.6″W	Loop		
Washington Park Court District		October 2, 1991		4900-4959 S. Washington Park Court; and 417-439 E. 50th Street	Grand Boulevard		
Washington Square Park, Chicago	Washington Square Park is pictured with Newberry Library in the background.	May 16, 1990		901 N. Clark Street; 41°53′57.9″N 87°37′50.0″W	Near North Side	May 20, 1991	
Washington Square Historic District		May 16, 1990		Washington Square Park, N. Dearborn Street, from W. Walton Street to W. Chicago Avenue.	Near North Side	August 21, 2003	
Washington Square District Extension		July 10, 2002		22-28 and 27-31 W. Chestnut Street and 802–818, 827–867, 1012, 1023–1029 and 1150–1154 N. Dearborn Street	Near North Side		
Washington Square District Extension, Isaac Maynard Row Houses		May 11, 2005		119-123 W. Delaware Place	Near North Side		
Old Chicago Water Tower District		October 6, 1971; amended June 10, 1981		806/821 N. Michigan Avenue	Near North Side	April 23, 1975	
Dr. Philip Weintraub House		November 18, 2009		3252 W. Victoria Street; 41°59′10.0″N 87°42′40.2″W	North Park		
Ida B. Wells-Barnett House	Ida B. Wells-Barnett House also contributes to the Black Metropolis-Bronzeville District.	October 2, 1995		3624 S. Dr. Martin Luther King Jr. Drive; 41°49′43.5″N 87°37′3.2″W	Douglas	May 30, 1974	May 30, 1974
West Burton Place District		June 22, 2016		143-161 W. Burton Place and 150-160 W. Burton Place	Near North Side	December 6, 2007	
West Pullman Elementary School	West Pullman Elementary School	May 25, 2018	1894, 1900, 1923	11917-11951 S. Parnell Avenue; 41°40′40.0″N 87°38′8.0″W	West Pullman		
West Side YMCA/YWCA Complex		November 14, 2018	1907–1931	1513-1539 W. Monroe Street and 101-109 S. Ashland Avenue; 41°40′39.7″N 87°38′7.9″W	Near West Side		
West Town State Bank Building		October 1, 2003		2400 W. Madison Street; 41°52′53.3″N 87°41′12.2″W	Near West Side		
Albert G. Wheeler House		April 4, 2013		970 W. Sheridan Road; 41°59′55.9″N 87°39′20.0″W	Rogers Park		
Wheeler-Kohn House	Wheeler-Kohn House	February 5, 1998		2018 S. Calumet Avenue; 41°51′18.2″N 87°37′10.0″W	Near South Side	August 12, 1999	
Whistle Stop Inn		December 5, 1990		4200 W. Irving Park Road; 41°57′14.3″N 87°43′57.8″W	Irving Park		
White Castle #16	White Castle #16	October 5, 2011	1930	43 E. Cermak Road; 41°51′10.0″N 87°37′31.2″W	Near South Side		
Wholesale Furniture Exposition Building		October 8, 2014	1904	1323 S. Michigan Avenue; 41°51′54.7″N 87°37′25.7″W	Near South Side		
Wicker Park District		April 12, 1991		Bounded by N. Bell Avenue, W. Caton Street, N. Leavitt Street, W. Potomac Avenue and "L" tracks	West Town		
Wingert House		July 31, 1990		6231 N. Canfield Avenue; 41°59′40.0″N 87°49′18.4″W	Norwood Park		
Woman's Athletic Club		October 2, 1991	1928	626 N. Michigan Avenue; 41°53′36.8″N 87°37′28.6″W	Near North Side		
Wood-Maxey-Boyd House		October 1, 2003		2801 S. Prairie Avenue; 41°50′36.3″N 87°37′11.9″W	Douglas		
Richard Wright House		February 10, 2010		4831 S. Vincennes Avenue; 41°48′24.6″N 87°36′49.0″W	Grand Boulevard		
Wrigley Building	Wrigley Building	May 9, 2012	1921	400-410 N. Michigan Avenue; 41°53′21.7″N 87°37′27.7″W	Near North Side		
Wrigley Field		February 11, 2004		1060 W. Addison Street; 41°56′55.0″N 87°39′19.3″W	Lake View		
Yale Apartments		April 9, 2003		6565 S. Yale Avenue; 41°46′29.6″N 87°37′52.8″W	Englewood	March 5, 1998	
Yondorf Block and Hall		July 25, 2001		758 W. North Avenue; 41°54′40.9″N 87°38′52.8″W	Lincoln Park	November 13, 1984	

== Registered Historic Places and Landmarks not designated Chicago Landmarks ==
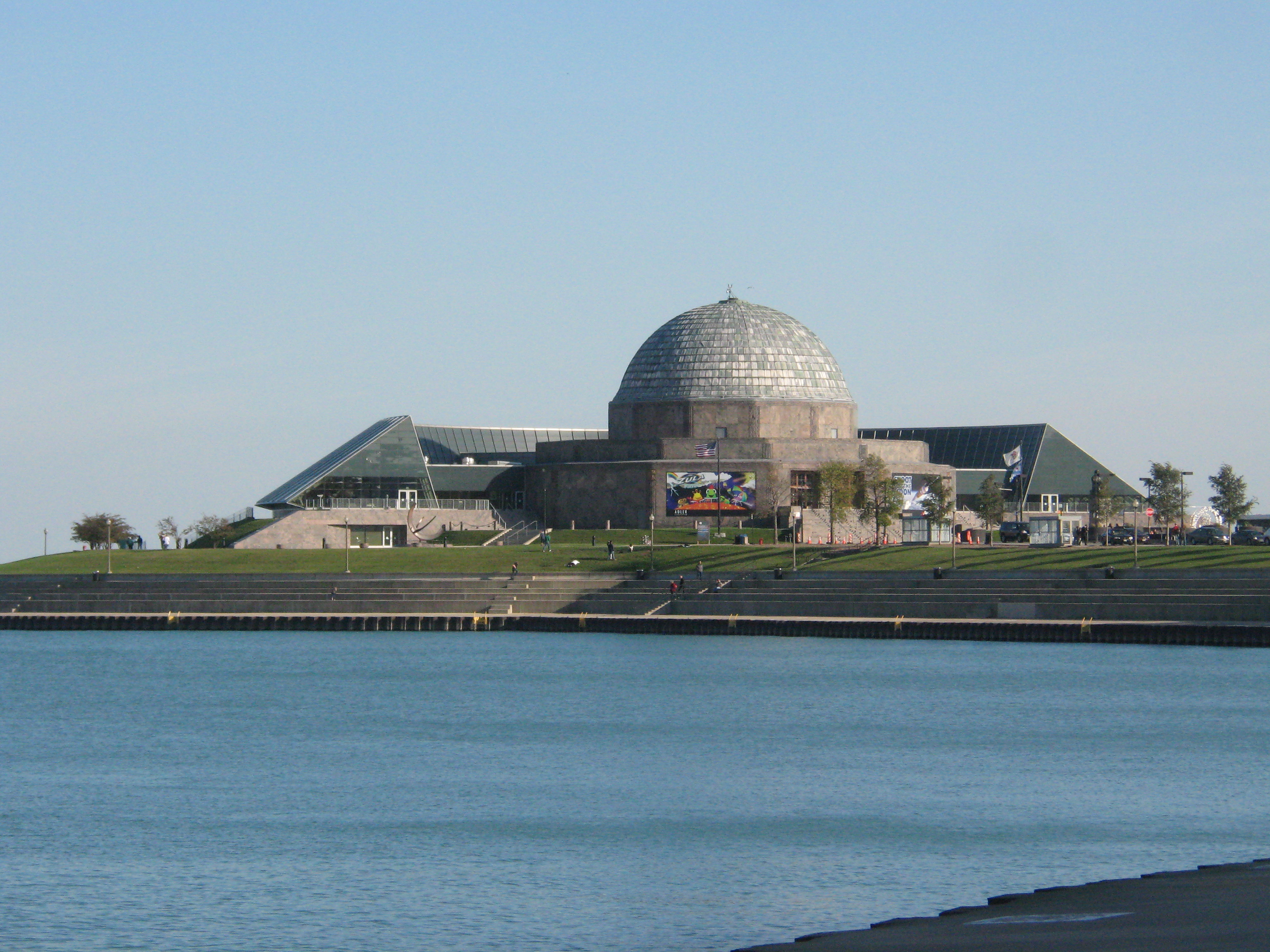
Adler Planetarium

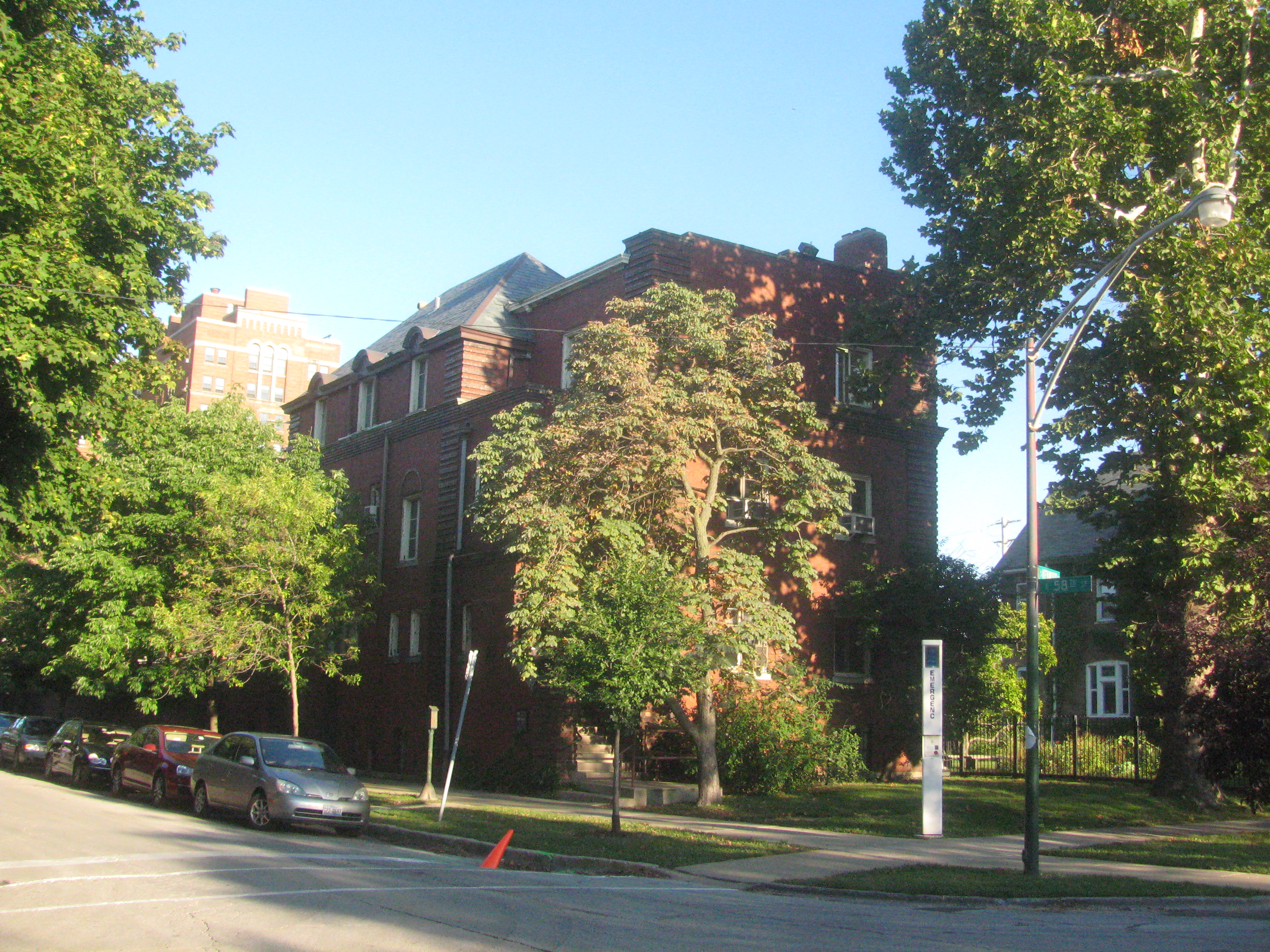
Frank R. Lillie House

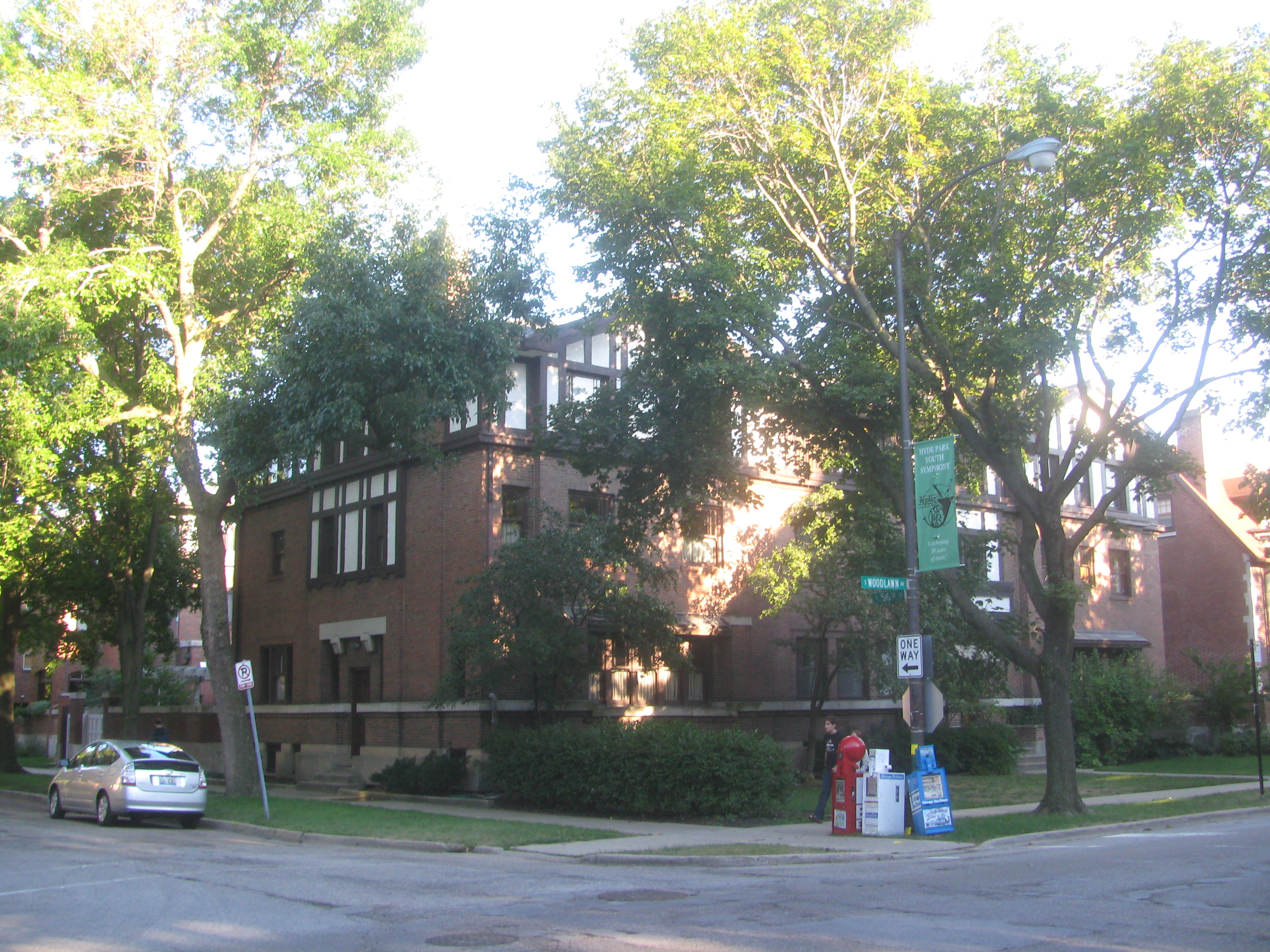
Robert A. Millikan House

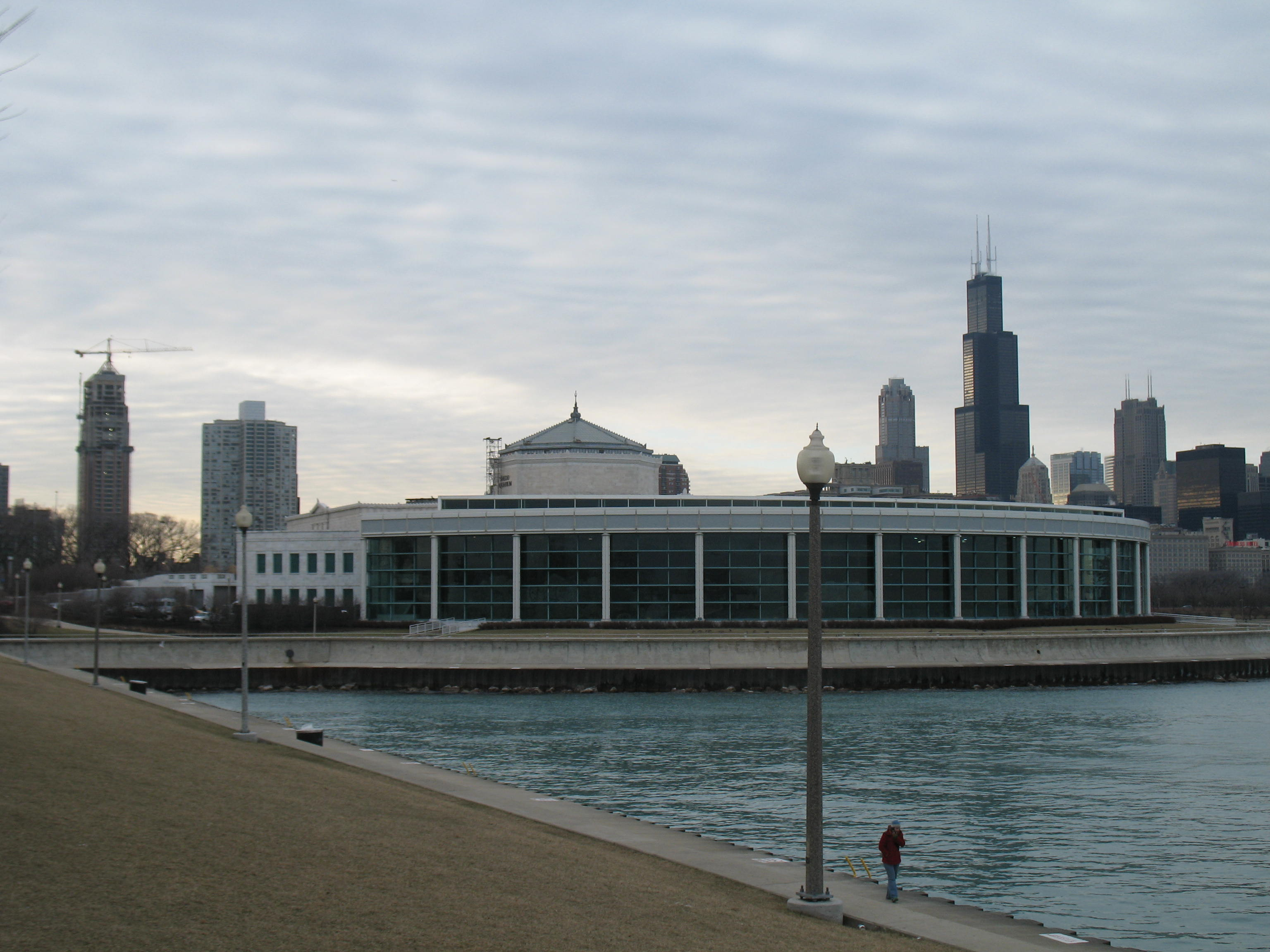
Shedd Aquarium

As noted in the list above, many places that are designated as city landmarks, but have not been nationally registered. There are also approximately 200 nationally Registered Historic Places in Chicago that are not also designated Chicago Landmarks. Of these, 13 are further designated as U.S. National Historic Landmarks:

Landmark	Location	NHL date	NRHP date
Abbott, Robert S. House	4742 S. Dr. Martin Luther King Jr. Drive	December 8, 1976	December 8, 1976
Adler Planetarium	1300 S. Lake Shore Drive	February 27, 1987	February 27, 1987
Columbus Park	500 S. Central Avenue	July 31, 2003	July 31, 2003
Compton, Arthur H., House	5637 S. Woodlawn Avenue	May 11, 1976	May 11, 1976
DePriest, Oscar Stanton, House	4536-4538 S. Dr. Martin Luther King Jr. Drive	May 15, 1975	May 15, 1975
Du Sable, Jean Baptiste Point, Homesite	401 N. Michigan Avenue	May 11, 1976	May 11, 1976
Lillie, Frank R., House	5801 S. Kenwood Avenue	May 11, 1976	May 11, 1976
Millikan, Robert A., House	5605 S. Woodlawn Avenue	May 11, 1976	May 11, 1976
Orchestra Hall	220 S. Michigan Avenue	April 19, 1994	March 21, 1978
Room 405, George Herbert Jones Laboratory	5747 S. Ellis Avenue	May 28, 1967	May 28, 1967
Shedd Aquarium	1200 S. Lake Shore Drive	February 27, 1987	February 27, 1987
U-505 (German Submarine)	Museum of Science and Industry	June 29, 1989	June 29, 1989
Williams, Daniel Hale, House	445 E. 42nd Street	May 15, 1975	May 15, 1975

== See also ==
- National Register of Historic Places listings in Central Chicago
- National Register of Historic Places listings in North Side Chicago
- National Register of Historic Places listings in South Side Chicago
- National Register of Historic Places listings in West Side Chicago
