= Arlington and Roslyn Place District =

Historic district in Chicago, Illinois, United States

Coordinates: 41.9275°N 87.6402°W

The Arlington and Roslyn Place District is a historic district in Chicago, Illinois, United States. The district was built between 1894 and 1910 by various architects. It was designated a Chicago Landmark on November 15, 1989.

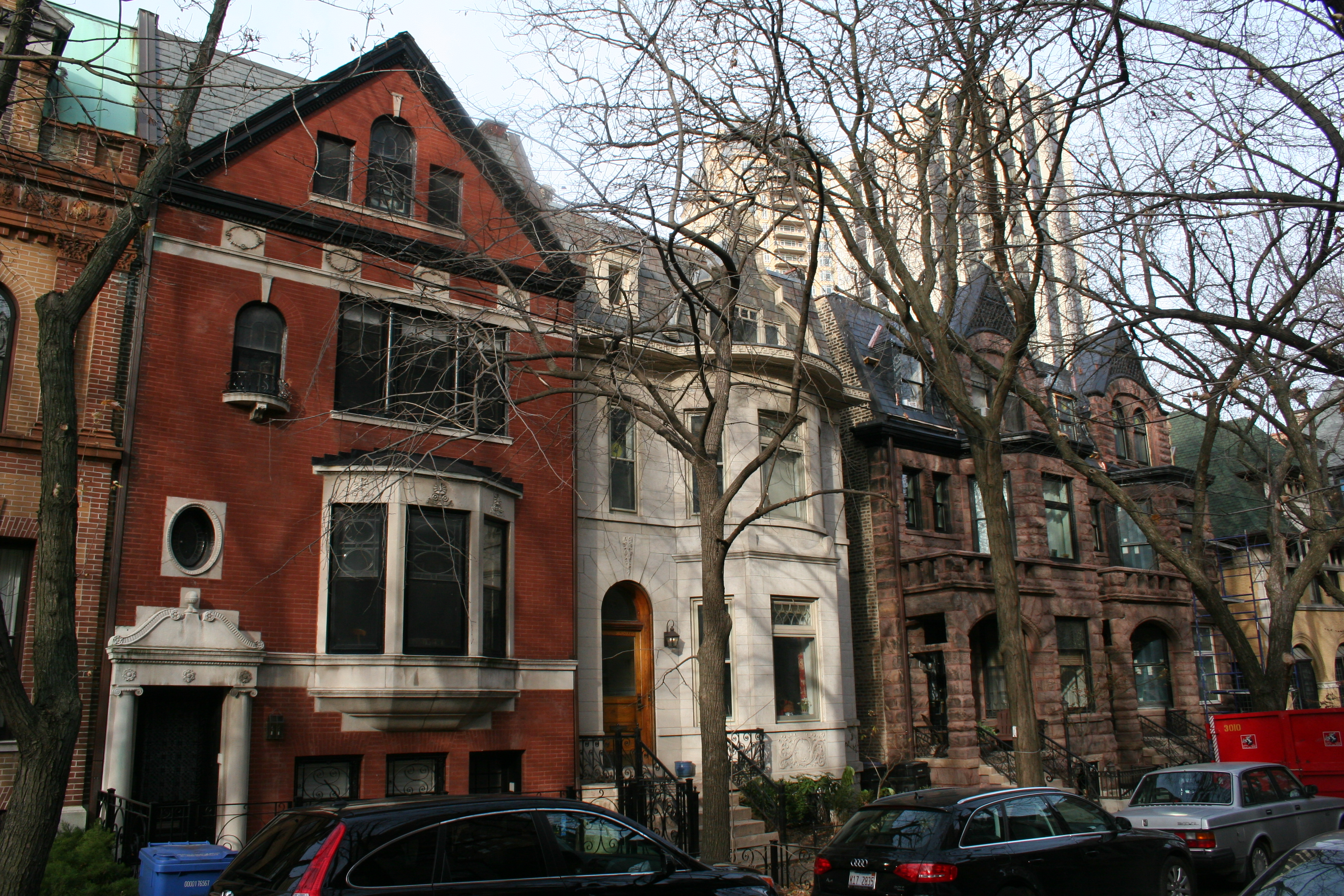
Buildings on Arlington Place
