= Race House =

Coordinates: 41.953105°N 87.733893°W

- Interactive map of the Race House area

General information
- Architectural style: Italianate style
- Completed: 1874

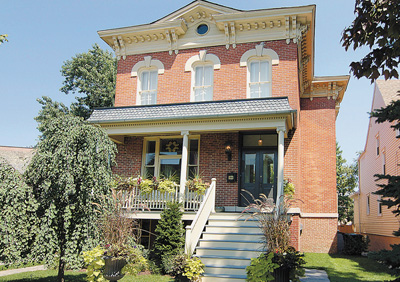
The Stephen A. Race House, Chicago, IL, circa 2007

The Race House is an Italianate style house located at 3945 North Tripp Avenue in the Irving Park neighborhood of Chicago, Illinois, United States. The house was built in 1874 by an unknown architect for Stephen A. Race. It was designated a Chicago Landmark on September 22, 1988.

== History ==
The house is the only known surviving home associated with the Race family, who were among the original founders of Irving Park. Built between 1873 and 1874, the house is a rare local example of a red brick Italianate-style structure that has largely retained its architectural integrity.

Originally situated on Irving Park Boulevard—once an Indigenous trail—the home exemplifies the type of grand residences that lined the boulevard in the mid- to late-nineteenth century, when Irving Park functioned as a suburban/country retreat. Constructed at a cost of $12,000, the home was considered a substantial investment at the time. A companion home belonging to Charles T. Race, which no longer exists, was built at a slightly higher cost of $15,000. Both structures were designed in the Italianate style, which was widely popular in the United States between 1850 and 1880. While the architect is unknown, the similarities between the Race homes suggest a shared designer.

== Description ==
The Stephen A. Race House is a four-story Victorian Italianate residence constructed of red brick, with white limestone detailing and painted wood trim. Its form and style are inspired by the villas of Tuscany in Northern Italy, characterized by a symmetrical box shape and flat roof. The roofline is marked by large, paired eave brackets in an elaborately scrolled design, a typical feature of the Italianate style.

One prominent architectural element is the treatment of the second-story windows. These tall, narrow windows feature two-over-two lights and are framed with semi-circular arches topped with pronounced limestone keystones.

=== Alterations ===
The exterior of the home’s first floor has undergone alterations, most likely during its relocation in the early twentieth century. A plaque outside the home dates this move to 1924, although other records suggest 1905. During this time, a large bay window—characteristic of late Victorian design—replaced two original tall windows on the front façade. The Indiana limestone foundation still displays the outlines of the original window placement. The exterior front doors were also likely modified, with the original design possibly mirroring the arched interior doors.

The current front porch was built in 2001 as a replica of an earlier porch added after the home’s relocation. The original design likely included a cast-iron staircase on a limestone base, leading to a landing at the double doors.

The relocation involved a 90-degree rotation of the house, changing its orientation from north-facing (on Irving Park Boulevard) to west-facing (on Tripp Avenue). The home remains on a portion of its original lot, which once spanned what are now five city lots. The area now occupied by the house may have originally contained stables and other outbuildings. The relocation was prompted by the commercial development of Irving Park Boulevard, which also led to the demolition of the Charles T. Race House.

=== Restoration and ownership history ===
Despite some alterations, the architectural integrity of the Race House has been largely preserved. Restoration efforts began in 2002 when the property was purchased by Mark Gregory Jones and Bradley Maury. They converted the previously unfinished third-floor attic into a master suite and undertook extensive renovations. The house was sold in 2014 to Chris and Alison Domino, and again in 2019 to its current owners, Dana and Drew Sarros.

A stained glass panel in the front living room window, installed in 2002, is a reproduction based on a historical black-and-white photograph. The design replicates the original, though the colors differ.

During a period of abandonment in the late 1980s and early 1990s, several original architectural elements were removed, including four white Carrara marble fireplace mantels and the front hall’s newel post. These have since been replaced with period-appropriate items. The interior woodwork is painted and reflects the robust decorative style typical of Italianate homes from the era.
