= Burling Row House District =

Historic district in Illinois

Coordinates: 41.9229°N 87.6472°W

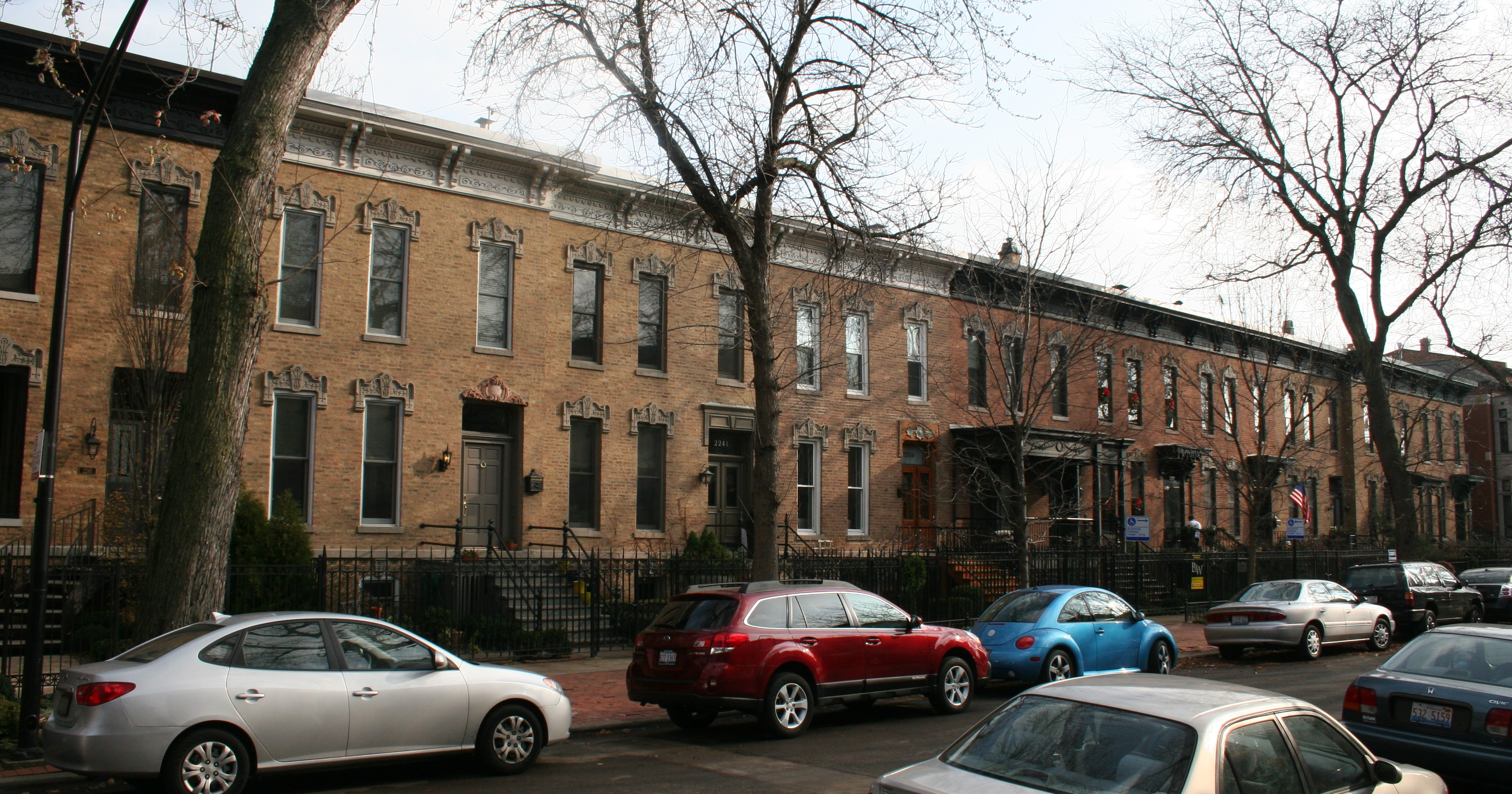
Burling Street Row Houses

The Burling Row House District is a historic district in Chicago, Illinois, United States. The district was built in the post-Chicago Fire year of 1875 by Edward J. Burling. It was designated a Chicago Landmark on November 15, 2000.
