= Jackson-Thomas House =

Coordinates: 42.0104°N 87.6821°W

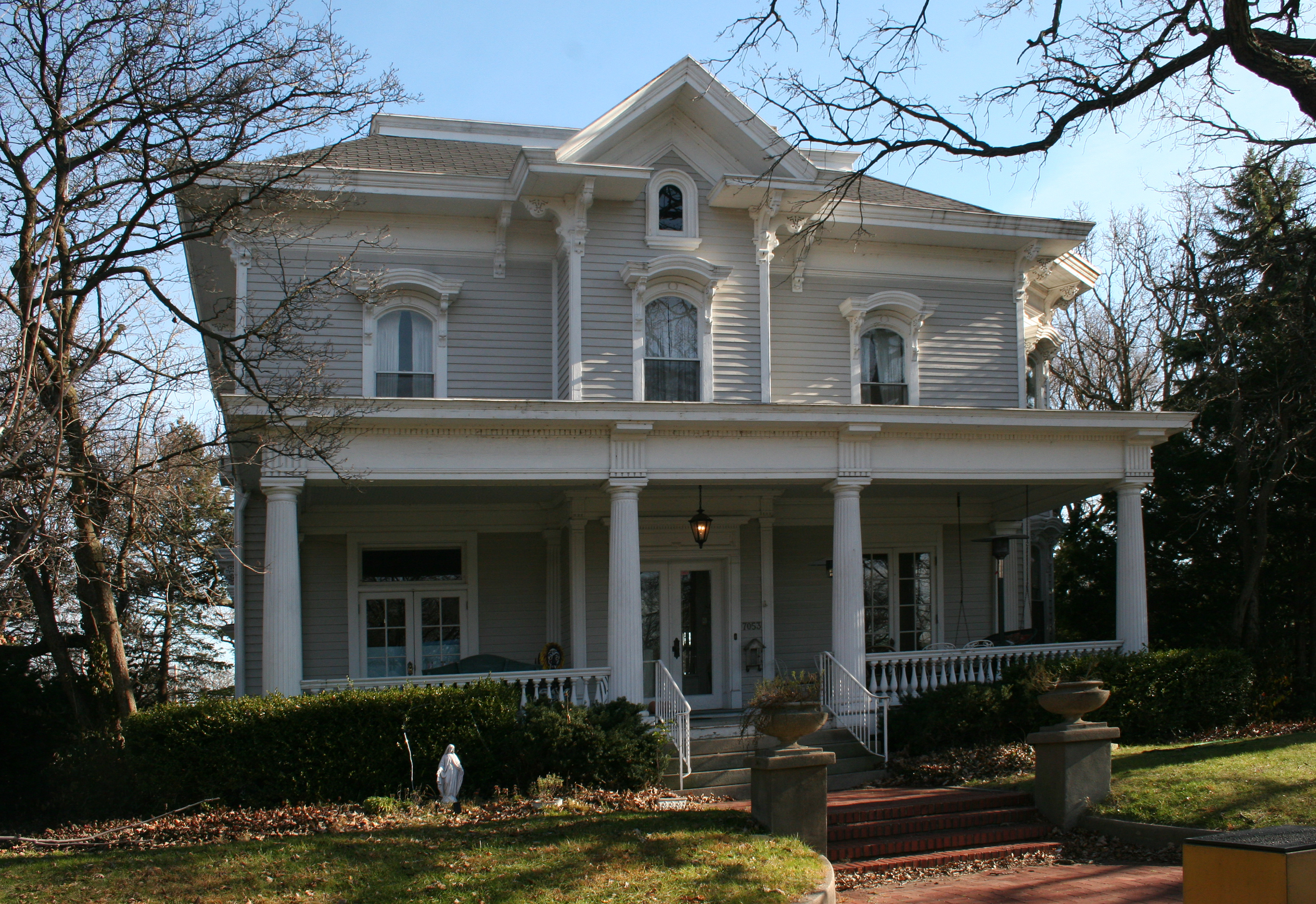
- Interactive map of the Jackson-Thomas House area

General information
- Architectural style: Italianate style
- Location: Chicago, Illinois
- Completed: 1874

The Jackson-Thomas House is an Italianate style and Second Empire architecture house at 7053 North Ridge Avenue in the Rogers Park neighborhood of Chicago, Illinois, United States. The house was built in 1874 by an unknown architect, but Andrew B. Jackson, one of the five partners in the Rogers Park Land Company worked on it. Manufacturer L.H. Thomas acquired the property in 1879. It was designated a Chicago Landmark on October 16, 1984. Around 1910, the porch and entrance was added, in a classical design.
