= Armitage-Halsted District =

Historic district in Chicago, Illinois, United States

Coordinates: 41.9182°N 87.6486°W

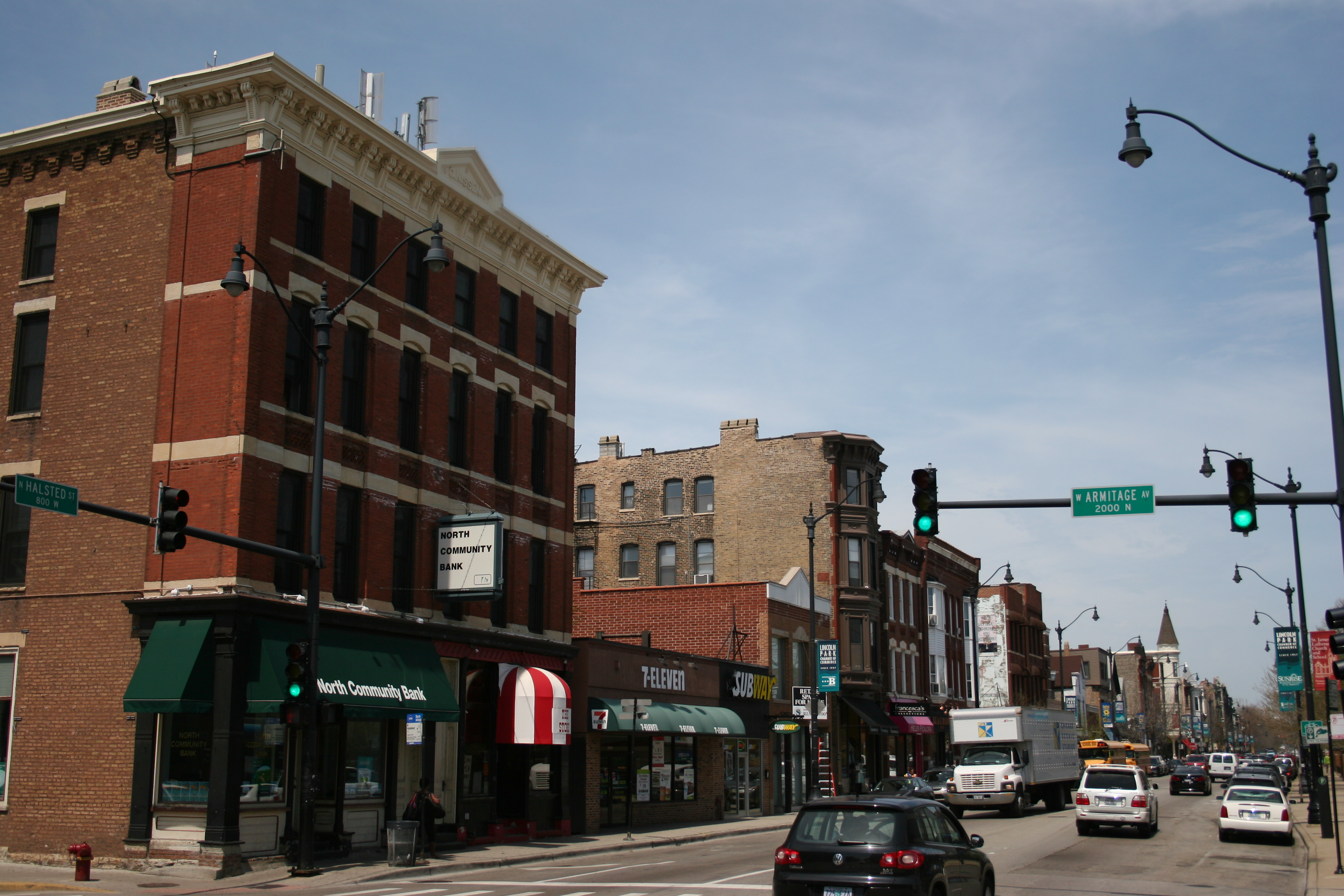
Intersection of Armitage Av and Halsted St

The Armitage-Halsted District is a historic district in the Lincoln Park community area of Chicago, Illinois, United States. The district was built between 1870 and 1930 by various architects. It was designated a Chicago Landmark on February 5, 2003.
