= Five Houses on Avers District =

Historic district in Chicago, Illinois

Coordinates: 41°51′12.6″N 87°43′16.8″W

The Five Houses on Avers District is a historic district in Chicago, Illinois, United States. The district was built between 1892 and 1894 by Frederick B. Townsend. It was designated a Chicago Landmark on March 2, 1994.
