= Raber House =

House in Illinois, United States of America

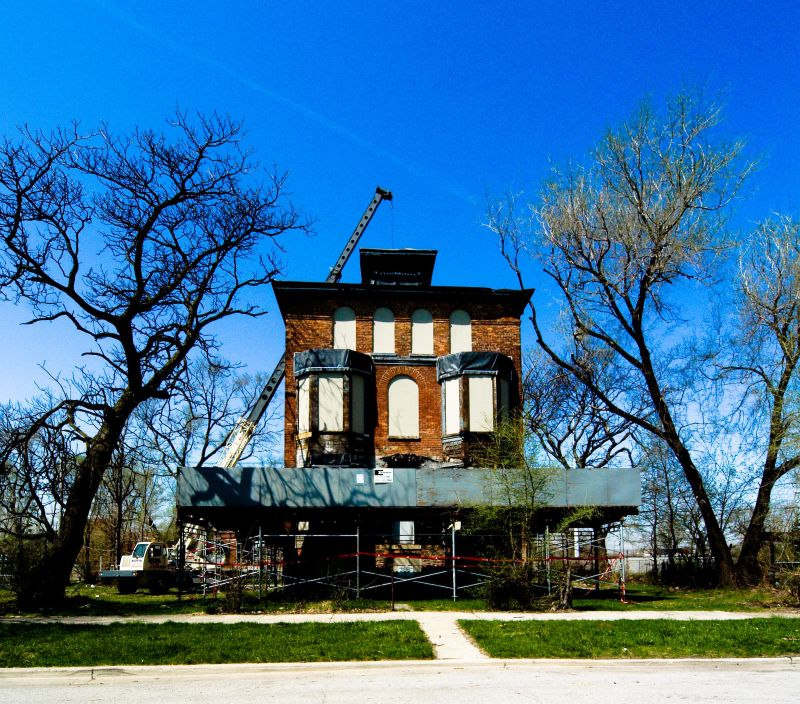
- Raber House under renovation in 2007

- Location within Chicago metropolitan area Location within Illinois

General information
- Location: 5760 South Lafayette Avenue, Chicago, United States
- Coordinates: 41.7892°N 87.6269°W
- Completed: 1870

The Raber House is an Italianate style house located at 5760 South Lafayette Avenue in the Washington Park neighborhood of Chicago, Illinois, United States. The house was built in 1870 by Thomas Wing. It was designated a Chicago Landmark on April 16, 1996.
