= Hawthorne Place District =

Historic district in Chicago, U.S.

Coordinates: 41.9444°N 87.6439°W

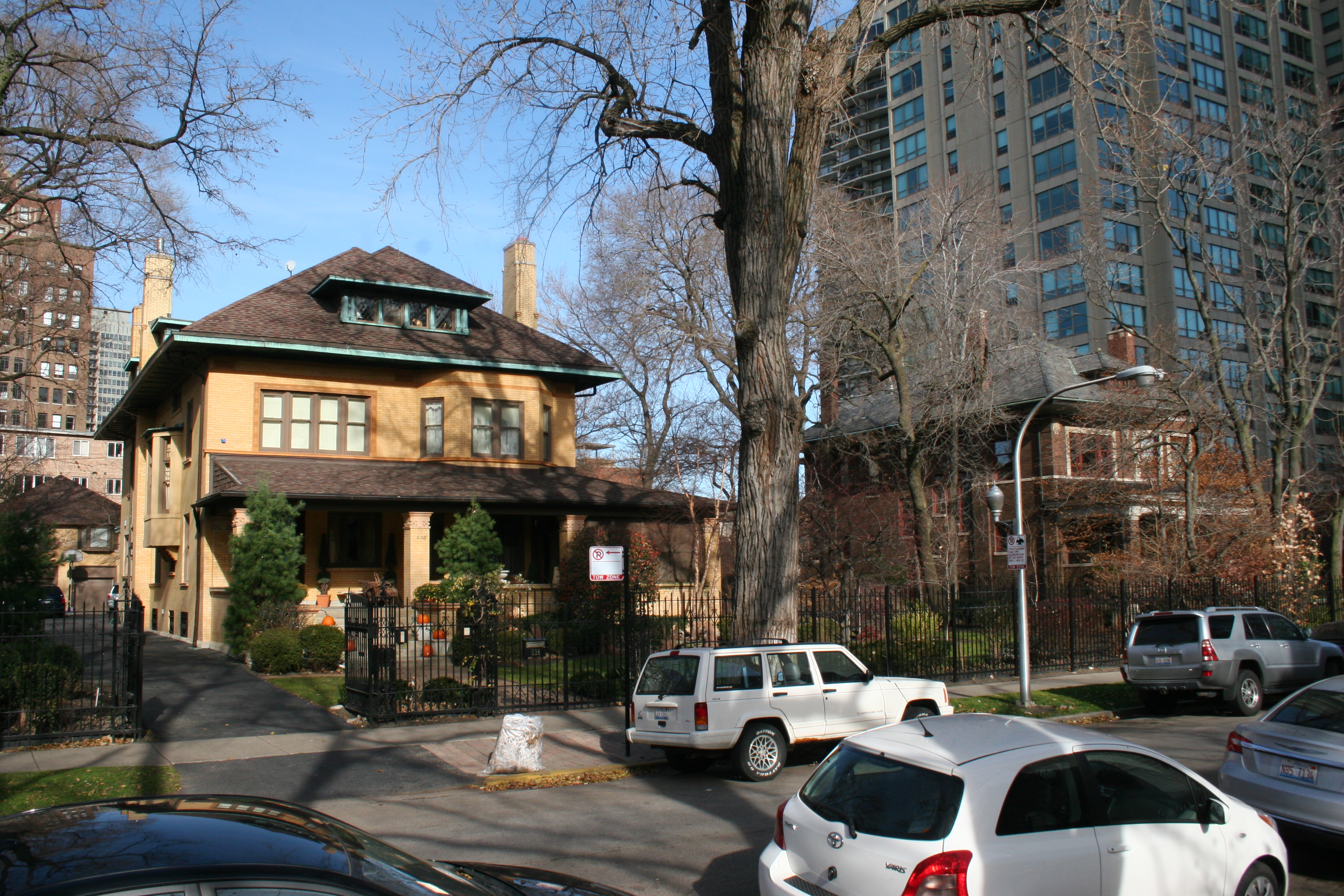
Houses in the Hawthorne Place District

The Hawthorne Place District is a historic district in Chicago, Illinois, United States. The district was built in the 1890s by various architects including the McConnell brothers, Burnham & Root, and Pond & Pond. It was designated a Chicago Landmark on March 26, 1996.
