= Eliel House =

Coordinates: 41.8193°N 87.6027°W

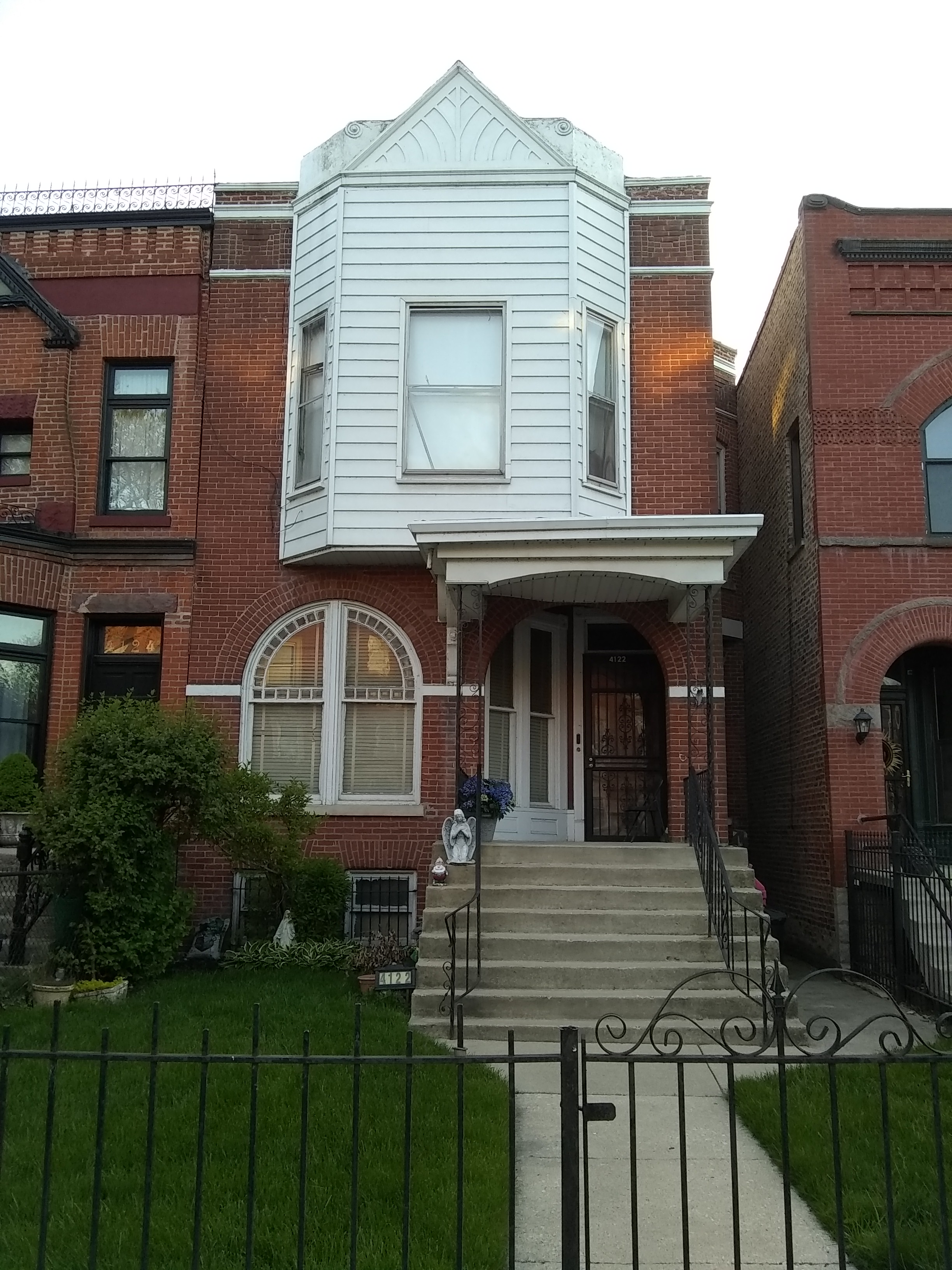
- Interactive map of the Eliel House area

General information
- Location: 4122 South Ellis Avenue, Chicago, Illinois, United States
- Completed: 1886

Design and construction
- Architect: Adler & Sullivan

Chicago Landmark
- Designated: October 2, 1991

The Eliel House is a house at 4122 South Ellis Avenue in Chicago, Illinois, United States. The house was built in 1886 by Adler & Sullivan for Mathilde Eliel. It was designated a Chicago Landmark on October 2, 1991.
