= McCormick Row House District =

Group of houses in Chicago, Illinois, United States

Coordinates: 41°55′28″N 87°39′2″W

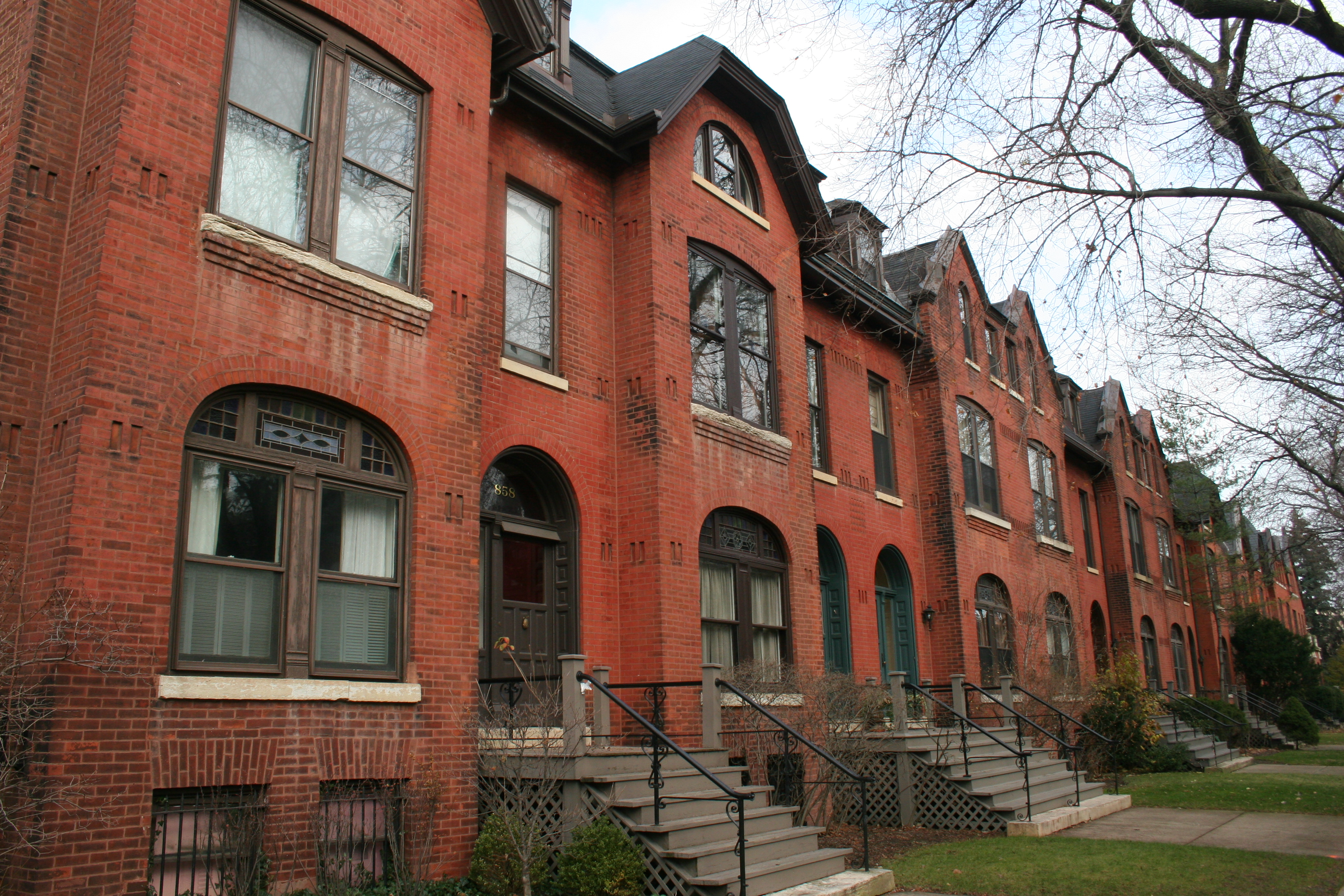
Row Houses on Belden Av

The McCormick Row House District is a group of houses located in the Lincoln Park community area in Chicago, Illinois, United States. It sits between the east and west parts of DePaul University's Lincoln Park Campus and is independent from the establishment.

The houses were built between 1884 and 1889 and used by the McCormick Theological Seminary to gain rental income. They were designed in the Queen Anne style by A. M. F. Colton and Son architects and joined the list of Chicago Landmarks on May 4, 1977. The McCormick Row House District also lies within the boundaries of the Sheffield Historic District.

In 1973, the McCormick Theological Seminary made the decision to affiliate with the theological seminaries connected with the University of Chicago. In 1974, several McCormick Row House tenants formed the Seminary Townhouse Association and found buyers for all of the seminary's residential units. McCormick Row Houses are now owned by individual owners, with covenants protecting the treatment and maintenance of building exteriors and public areas such as the McCormick Row House private park.
