= Serbian American Museum =

American museum

- Formation: 1952
- Defunct: May 17, 2016; 10 years ago
- Location: 448 W Barry Ave, Chicago, IL 60657, United States.
- Website: www.serbianamericanmuseum.org

Serbian American Museum also known as Serbian American Museum St. Sava was a Chicago based museum which was situated at the historic Daniel O. Hill House at Barry avenue Chicago. The Museum closed in 2016.

== History ==
The building Daniel O. Hill House was designed by architect Frederick Wainwright Perkins in 1906. He initially designed the building for silk merchant Daniel O. Hill. The mansion started to operate as Chicago's Serbian American Museum in 1952 under the name Serbian Cultural Club. The Serbian Cultural Club was founded by Dr. Slobodan Draskovic. In 2011, the Serbian Cultural Club was renamed as Serbian American Museum St. Sava, "dedicated to protecting and promoting the history and culture of Serbians through a variety of undertakings." Over the time, the museum has exhibited many exclusive exhibitions specifically focusing on Serbian-American cultural heritage which includes Monastery of Hilandar, Royal Exhibits of Serbian Royal family of Karadjordjevic, Nikola Tesla.

The museum ceased to operate after the building was auctioned for sale in 2016. As per the last board secretary of the non profit organization that ran the museum, the primary reason for the discontinuation of the museum was pecuniary conditions and the distance of the museum from the area where most Serbian-Americans are settled in Chicago. With the aim to protect the historical significance, The Chicago Commission on Landmarks granted the protected status to the Serbian American Museum building.
