= West Pullman Elementary School =

- U.S. National Register of Historic Places
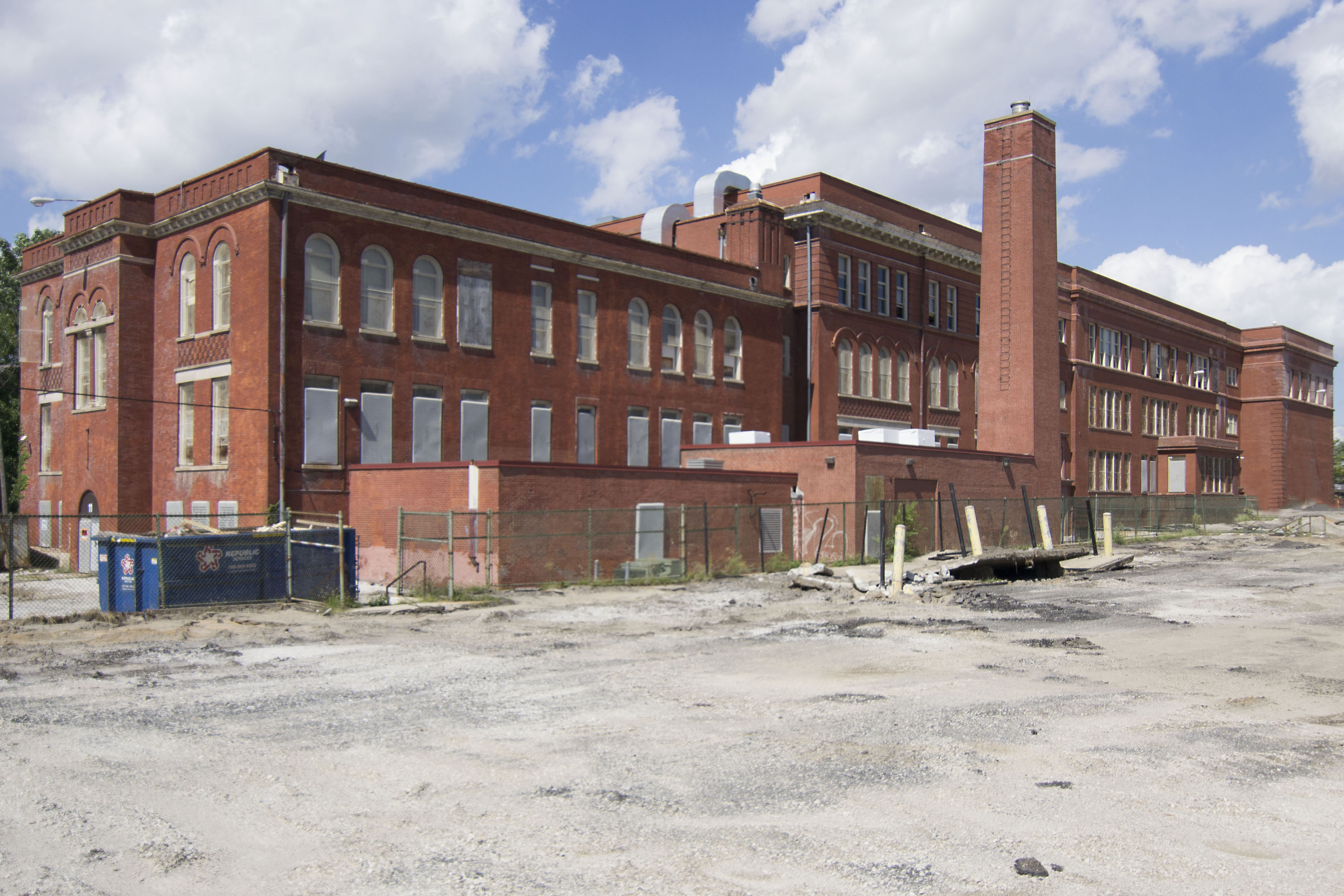

- Location within Chicago metropolitan area Location within Illinois Location within the United States
- Location: 11941 S. Parnell Ave., Chicago, Illinois
- Coordinates: 41°40′37″N 87°38′09″W
- Built: 1894
- Architect: W. August Fiedler
- Architectural style: Romanesque Revival, Classical Revival
- NRHP reference No.: 100002822
- Added to NRHP: August 27, 2018

The West Pullman Elementary School is a historic school building at 11941 S. Parnell Avenue in the West Pullman neighborhood of Chicago, Illinois. The school was built in 1894 to support the growing neighborhood; while West Pullman was not the most populous neighborhood in need of a new school, its land had been donated to the school district, reducing the school's cost enough for it to be feasible. School board architect W. August Fiedler designed the Romanesque Revival school, which features a red brick exterior, rounded arched windows, and ornamental brickwork. A 1900 addition to the school doubled its capacity; William Bryce Mundie, the architect for the addition, introduced Classical Revival elements such as terra cotta decorations and a bracketed cornice. A third addition in 1923, designed by John C. Christensen, largely matched the design of the original two sections. The school served students in West Pullman until it closed in 2013 as part of a wave of Chicago public school closings.

The building was added to the National Register of Historic Places on August 27, 2018.
