= Otto Meister =

Milwaukee theater operator

- Born: Otto L. Meister; 1869
- Died: July 10, 1944 (aged 74–75)
- Other names: O.L. Meister
- Occupation: Theater owner

Otto L. Meister (1869–July 10, 1944) was a theater owner who operated Nickelodeon theatres in Milwaukee, Wisconsin. Beginning in 1911 he operated several movie theaters including the Butterfly Theater.

== Career ==
c. 1900, Meister began operating Otto Meister’s Nickelodeon Theater and Phanta-Phone dime museum. In 1911 he built the Butterfly Theater on the site of the Nickelodeon, which was torn down in 1930 to make room for the Warner theater. He partnered with John R. Freuler to create the Central Amusement Company which also controlled the Vaudette, the Atlas and the Climax Theaters in Milwaukee.

The Butterfly opened on September 2, 1911; it became nationally known. The theater opened to 1,500 people and showed several movies. A six-piece orchestra played and the Loos Brothers sang a duet called "My Hula Hula Love".

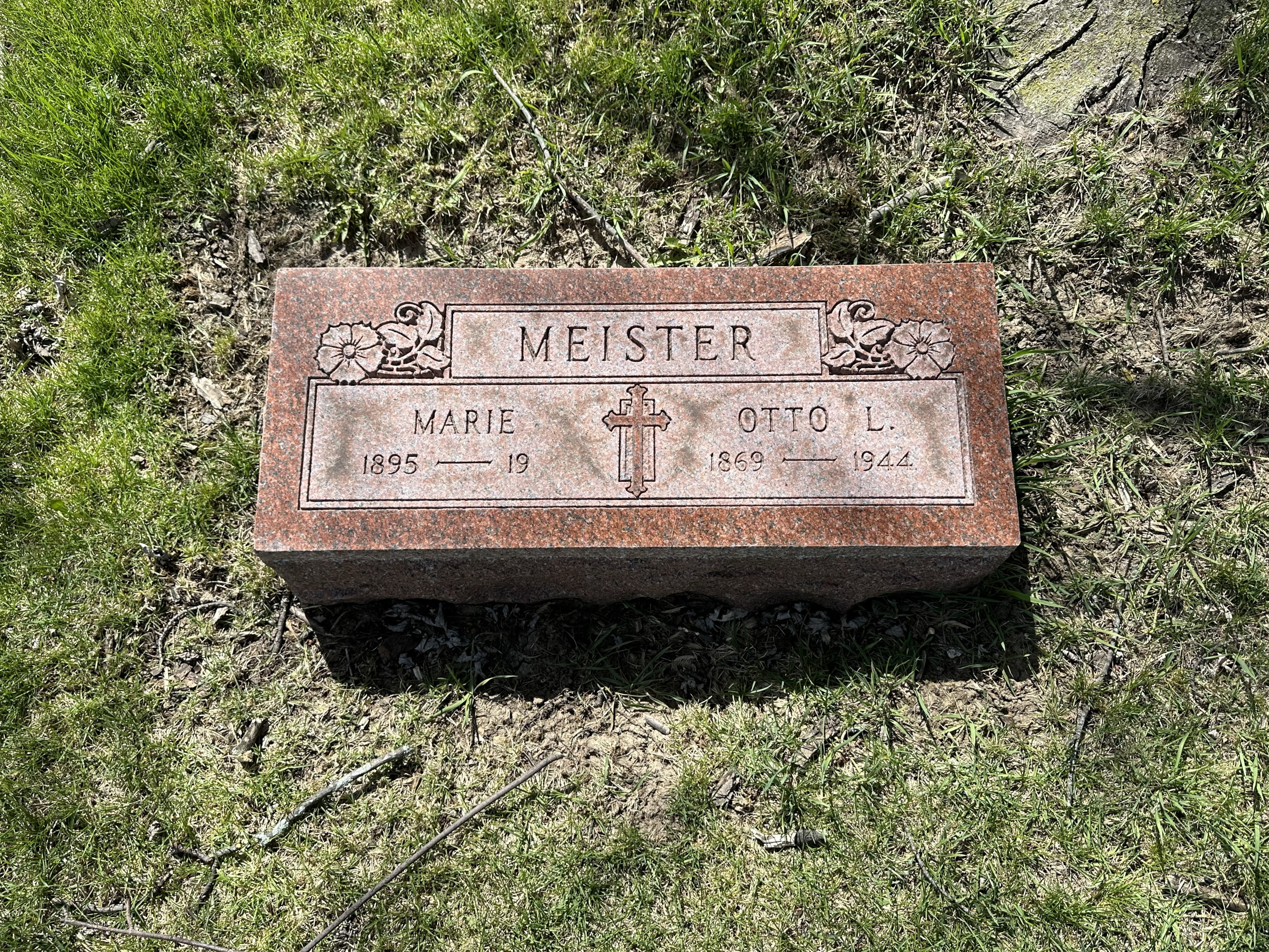
Otto Meister headstone

Meister continued to own theaters in the Milwaukee area and he developed a reputation as being unfair to organized labor. In 1929 he was operating the White House Theatre when someone detonated a stick of dynamite against a wall of the building. Windows were blown out but damage was contained. The perpetrator was never found.

== Death ==
Meister died on July 10, 1944; he was 74 years old. He was interred at Holy Cross Cemetery (Milwaukee).
