= Uptown Theatre (Milwaukee) =

Former theater in Milwaukee, Wisconsin

Coordinates: 43°03′40″N 87°58′30″W

Uptown Theatre was a 1,818-seat theatre located in Milwaukee, Wisconsin. It was built by the Chicago architectural firm Rapp and Rapp and opened in 1926 or 1927. The theatre closed in 1980 and was demolished in 2001.
