= Leland City Club =

Nightclub in Detroit, Michigan, U.S.

Coordinates: 42°20′01″N 83°03′16″W

Leland City Club, also known initially as Liedernacht, is an American goth-industrial club in Detroit, Michigan. Founded by Mike Higgins in 1983, it has become a staple of the city's alternative and electronic music scene, hosting gothic, industrial, techno, and house music. Situated in the Leland Hotel, the club has host to various artists and has been a venue for the gothic and industrial music community in Detroit and other areas.

== History ==
The club was originally opened under the name Liedernacht, which translates to "night song" in German, reflecting its initial musical and cultural influences. The transition to Leland City Club marked a shift in focus towards a broader range of alternative and electronic music genres.

In its early years, Leland City Club was known for its blend of goth, New Wave, and punk music, attracting a diverse crowd that included goths, punks, and music enthusiasts from various backgrounds. The club's format evolved over time, incorporating industrial and electronic music into its repertoire. This evolution mirrored broader musical trends and the club's position in Detroit's underground music scene.

Musicians and bands at the club have included Skinny Puppy, Depeche Mode, the Beastie Boys, the Smashing Pumpkins, Public Enemy, Rob Zombie, the Red Hot Chili Peppers, Nine Inch Nails, and Marilyn Manson.
