= The Leland Hotel (Detroit) =

- Detroit-Leland Hotel
- U.S. National Register of Historic Places
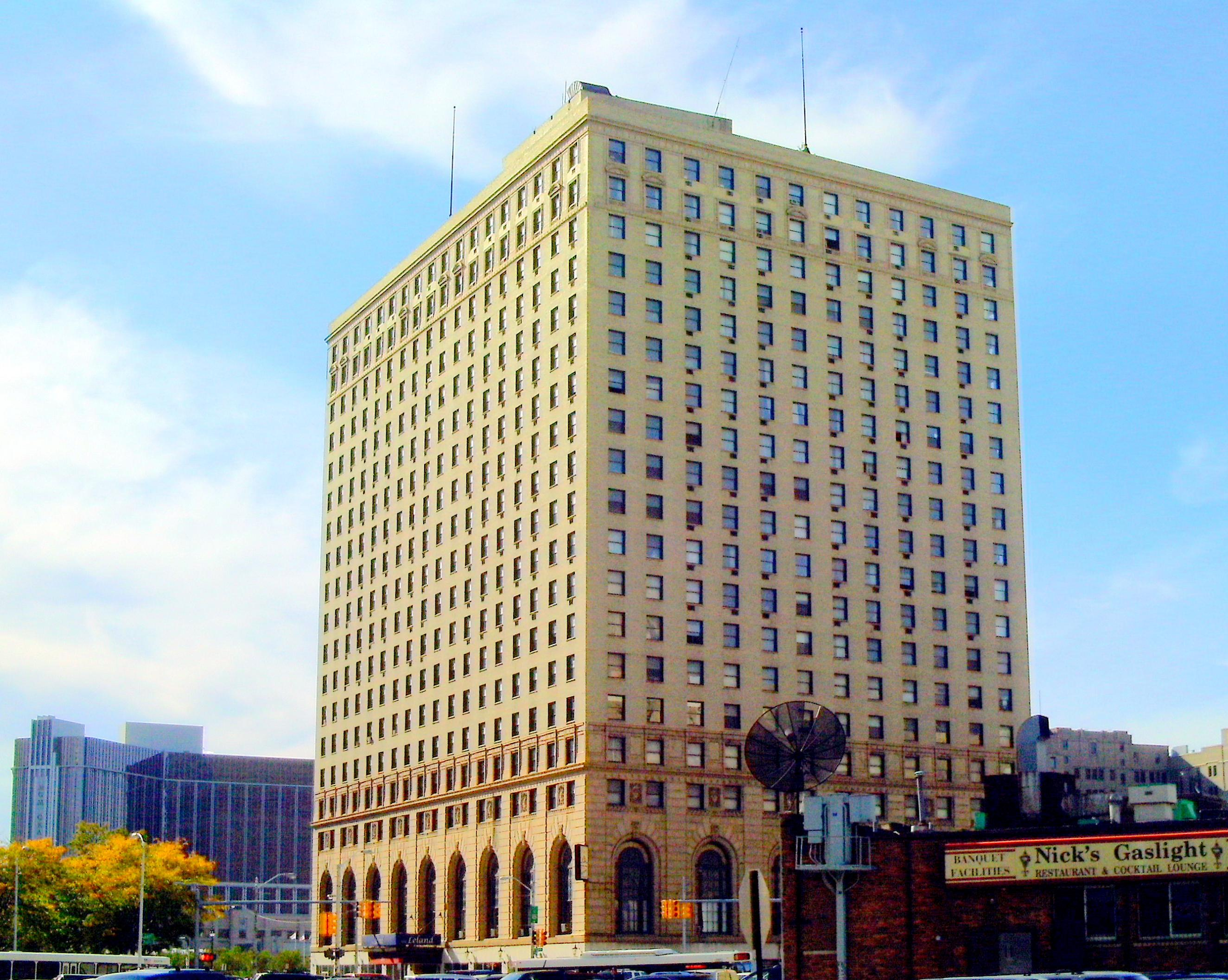

- Location within Michigan Location within the United States
- Interactive map
- Location: 400 Bagley St., Detroit, Michigan
- Coordinates: 42°20′1.28″N 83°3′15.34″W
- Built: 1927
- Architect: Rapp & Rapp
- Architectural style: Renaissance
- NRHP reference No.: 05000718
- Added to NRHP: July 20, 2005

The Detroit-Leland Hotel is a historic hotel located at 400 Bagley Street in Downtown Detroit, Michigan. It is the oldest continuously operating hotel in downtown Detroit, and was listed on the National Register of Historic Places in 2005. The ballroom of the Detroit-Leland has hosted a nightclub, the Leland City Club, since 1983. The hotel is now named The Leland and no longer rents to overnight guests.

== History ==
In the early 1920s, Edward A. Loveley and Harry A. Stormfeltz formed the Detroit Properties Corporation, with the purpose of developing Bagley Street outward from Grand Circus Park. The first building constructed was the Michigan Building at Bagley and Clifford, designed by the Chicago firm of Rapp & Rapp. The Michigan Building opened in 1926. The second building project undertaken by the Detroit Properties Corporation was the Detroit-Leland Hotel. Loveley and Stormfeltz again tapped Rapp & Rapp to design the building, and the Cleveland firm of Lundoff-Bicknell as contractors. Construction began in 1926, and the building cost $4.5 million.

The Detroit-Leland Hotel (named for Cadillac founder Henry M. Leland) opened its doors in April, 1927. It had 800 air-conditioned hotel rooms, along with a dining room, coffee shop, ball room, and 11 stores at street level.

However, by 1929 the ownership was having major financial problems and declared bankruptcy. The hotel remained in bankruptcy until 1936, but kept operating throughout this period. The Leland Hotel would notably be the hosting site of what would be considered the first NBA draft in history with the 1947 BAA draft (the BAA (Basketball Association of America) being the predecessor of the modern-day NBA via merger with the NBL) taking place there on June 2, 1947. By the 1950s, ownership had changed hands to Robert J. Sterling and his brothers Oliver and Edward. The Sterlings renovated the hotel in 1959/1960, prompted by the opening of Cobo Hall. In 1964 the hotel was again sold, this time to Robert K. and Donald Werbe, who renovated the hotel to have 473 apartments in addition to hotel rooms.

The hotel changed hands again in the 1970s, with Mayer Morganroth and John R. Ferris as owners, and in the 1980s when the Leland House Limited Partnership Company, headed by Michael W. Higgins, was formed. The 1980s recession hit the hotel hard, and the Leland became part of the Ramada hotel chain in 1988. The hotel reverted to its historical name in 2006. The Leland House Limited Partnership Company owned the Detroit Leland until June 2026, when a federal bankruptcy judge approved the building's sale to Mudhish Development Company LLC for $3 million. The court also found that tenants displaced by a power failure in 2025 were entitled to compensation.

== Construction ==
The Detroit-Leland Hotel is a 22-story building faced with brick, granite, and terra cotta with a flat roof. It was designed in the Beaux-Arts architectural style by the Chicago firm of Rapp & Rapp. The lower four floors of the hotel are rectangular in plan, with the upper floors taking on a U shape.

Vertically, the plan of the building divides into three parts: a four-story base, the main central section, and two-story attic. The street level is faced with marble, added likely in the 1960s. The section of the base above is faced in the original terra cotta. Round-arch windows reaching two stories light the second-floor spaces ballrooms, lobby and other public spaces. The third and fourth floors both contain pairs of double-hung windows separated by decorative terra cotta details. Between the fourth floor and the attic, the building is faced in buff-colored brick. A beltcourse separates the main section from the attic.

The Bagley Avenue entrance has three doorways, with a revolving door flanked by plate glass doors. The two glass doors have a sidelight, and all three have transom windows above. Original detailed metalwork divides the doors and windows. Inside, the entryway leads to a corridor accessing the commercial spaces on the ground floor. A set of six stairs leads into a wide turned staircase, which still has original wrought iron banisters and railings. The staircase leads to the main lobby on the second floor. The lobby is two stories tall, and leads to a ballroom, conference room, and associated facilities.

On the upper floors are the hotel's guest rooms. These rooms have been reconfigured in varying arrangements, and all contain kitchens, sitting rooms and separate bedroom areas. Floors 5–9 contain rental apartments, floors 10–17 are used as hotel rooms, and floors 18–20 are used as apartments. The basement level contains mechanical and laundry rooms, repair shops, employee locker rooms and toilets, and the Leland City Club nightclub.
