= Palace Theatre (Cincinnati, Ohio) =

- U.S. National Register of Historic Places
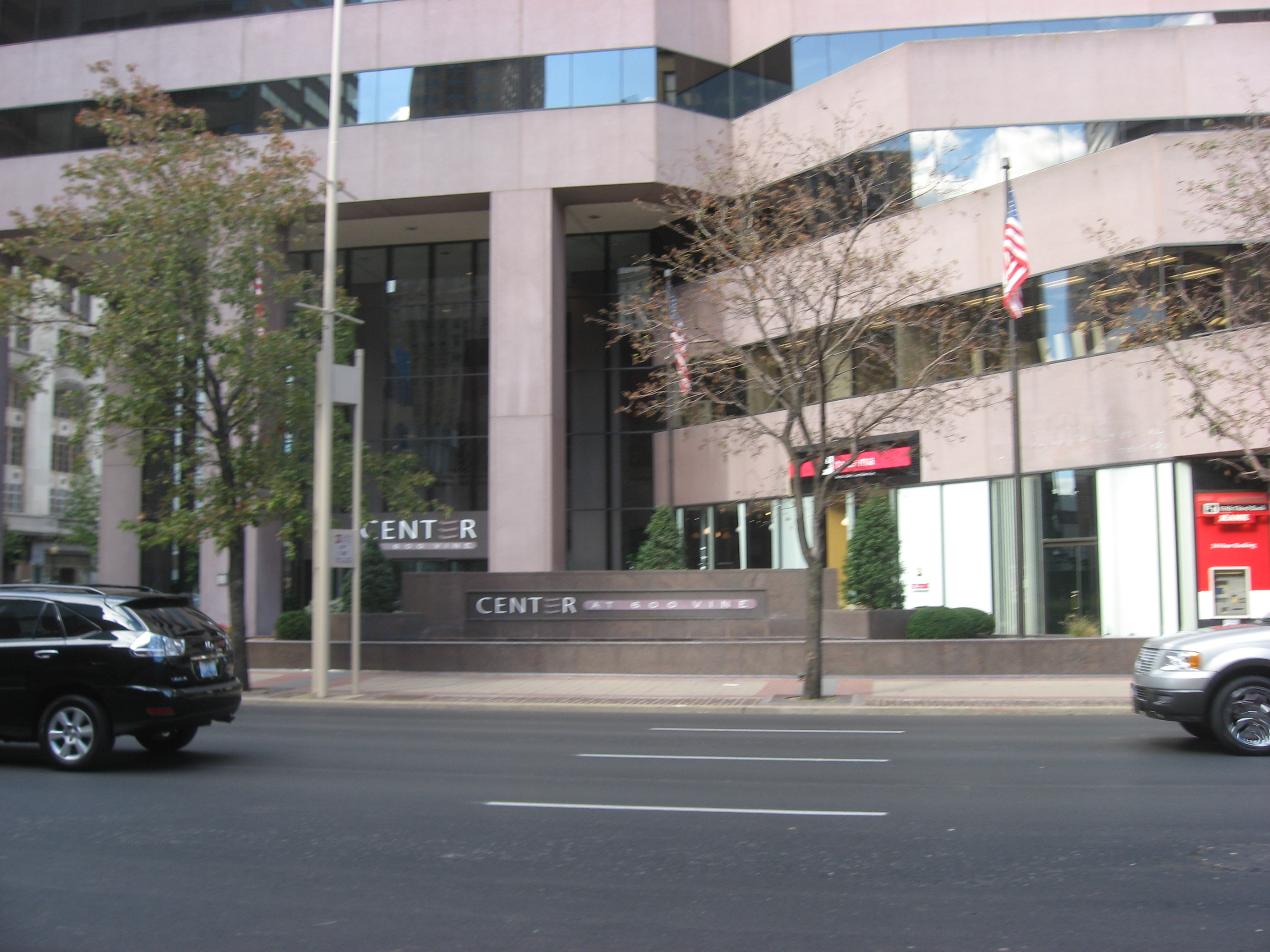
- A modern building at the site of the former theater

- Location within Ohio Location within the United States
- Location: 12 E. 6th St., Cincinnati, Ohio
- Coordinates: 39°6′9″N 84°30′46″W
- Area: 0.5 acres (0.20 ha)
- Built: 1918
- Architect: George Rapp
- NRHP reference No.: 80004067
- Added to NRHP: March 24, 1980

The Palace Theatre was a historic movie palace in downtown Cincinnati, Ohio, United States. Constructed at the dawn of the Roaring Twenties, it originally housed stage acts before conversion into a movie theater. Named a historic site because of its architecture, it was demolished in the early 1980s following years of financial failures.

== Architecture ==
Built in the Italianate style, the Palace was a five-story stone building topped with a finial at the center of a bracketed cornice. The facade was divided into five bays: on the first two stories, the middle bay comprised a wide arch around the main entrance and marquee, and the other bays included one large window each, while stories three through five comprised all smaller windows, with four in the middle and two in each of the others. Inside, the building was carefully constructed to minimize structural interference and to maximize visibility: although the theater was built to hold an audience of 2,600, none of the seats came near to being placed behind structural members. Instead, the ceiling was supported by a set of arches and vaults, covered with elaborate plaster details; the result was an exceptionally high-quality acoustic structure, important in the days of vaudeville. The red carpet was laid out permanently in the foyer, and space was provided in the main part of the theater for an orchestra that was available to play for ever performance. In 1930, the theater demonstrated its technological sophistication by installing air conditioning.

== History ==
Designed by architect George Rapp of Chicago, the Palace was the last theater built in Cincinnati before movies gained the prominence that they now enjoy. Built by the Ohio Construction Company at a cost of half a million dollars, the theater originally showed primarily vaudeville acts, but by the time RKO Pictures purchased it in 1930, it had been renovated to facilitate the showing of movies. Nevertheless, its stage remained useful; among the many performers who appeared live on its stage during the RKO era were Doris Day, Bing Crosby, and Burns and Allen. During its heyday, the theater would feature one act after another throughout the day, going from noon until almost midnight. Into the 1970s, it was still featuring both movies and live performances; although a group of investors spent more than $1 million to renovate it in 1978 and 1979, attendance continued to drop, and the doors were permanently closed by 1980. The building was demolished in 1982, and a new skyscraper, the Cincinnati Commerce Center, was erected in its place in 1984. Since the destruction of the Palace Theater, Cincinnati has been without a downtown movie palace; comparable buildings survive in nearby cities such as Columbus (Ohio Theatre) and Indianapolis (Indiana Theatre), serving as the homes of their symphony orchestras, unlike Cincinnati, whose orchestra plays at Music Hall in Over-the-Rhine.

In 1980, the Palace was listed on the National Register of Historic Places, qualifying because of its place in local history, but the designation was unable to prevent its replacement with a skyscraper. Even though the theater has been gone for more than thirty years, it officially remains on the Register.
