= Holy Cross Cemetery (Milwaukee) =

Cemetery in Milwaukee, Wisconsin

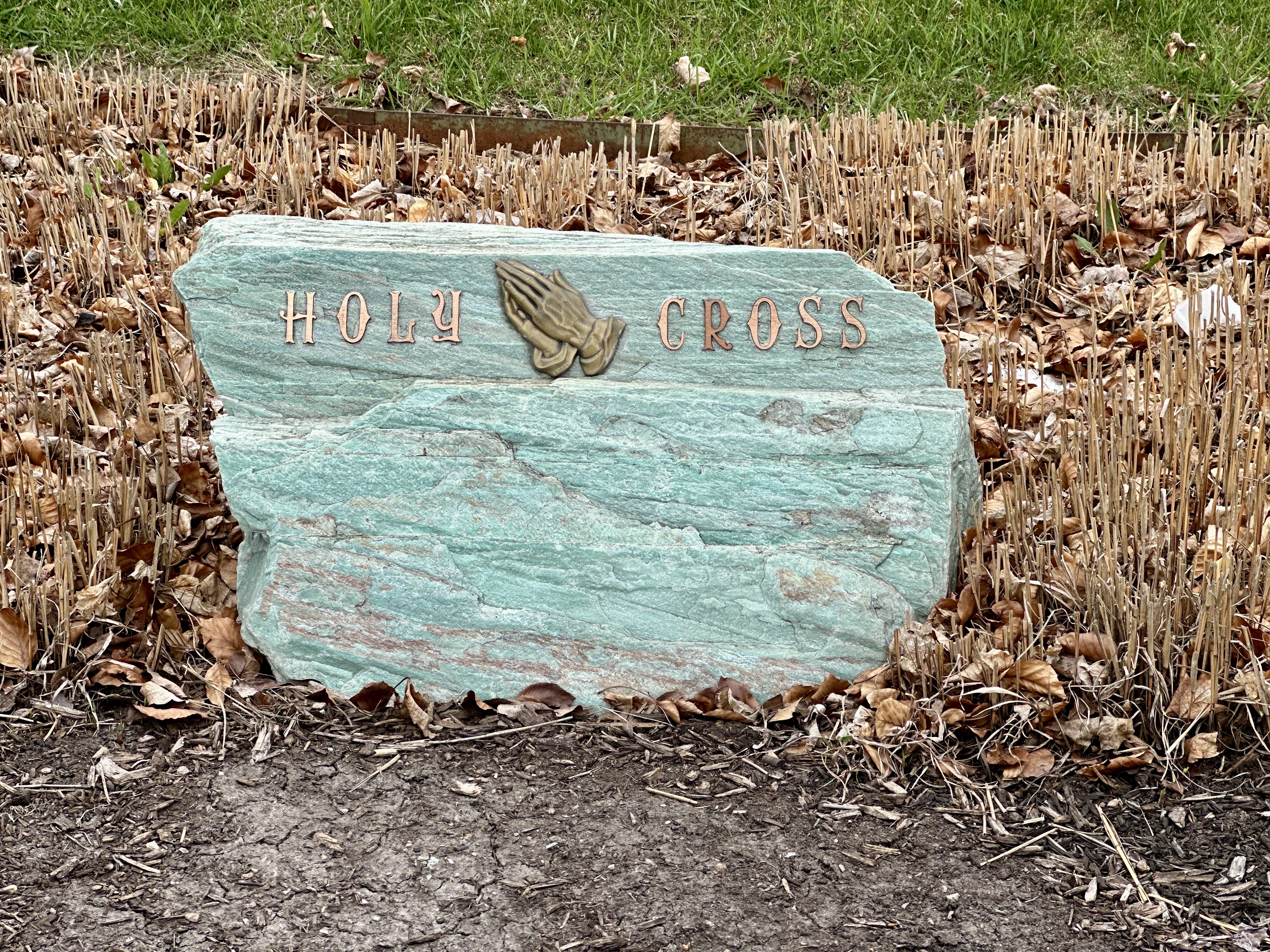
- Interactive map of Holy Cross Cemetery

Details
- Established: 1909
- Location: Milwaukee, Wisconsin
- Country: United States
- Coordinates: 43.0803°N 88.0019°W
- Type: Roman Catholic
- Owned by: Archdiocese of Milwaukee
- Size: 196-acre (79 ha)
- Website: Archdiocese of Milwaukee Catholic Cemeteries
- Find a Grave: Holy Cross Cemetery

Holy Cross Cemetery & Mausoleum, is a Roman Catholic cemetery in Milwaukee, Wisconsin. The cemetery was established in 1909 and has 135,000 burials in graves and about 15,000 in crypts and niches.

== History ==
Holy Cross Cemetery & Mausoleum is located at 7301 West Nash Street in Milwaukee, Wisconsin. It is a Roman Catholic cemetery operated by the Archdiocese of Milwaukee. The cemetery was established in 1909, the cemetery comprises 196-acre (79 ha), with about 135,000 burials in graves and about 15,000 in crypts and niches. It is one of eight cemeteries that are run by the Archdiocese. In 2023 550 crypts were added to the Holy Cross and St. Adalbert cemeteries.

In 2017 the Archdiocese paid for the burial of the artist Timothy Decker. Milwaukee Journal Sentinel said that the artist "died indigent and in isolation".

=== Notable burials ===
- James B. Brennan (1926–2021) – United States Attorney for the Eastern District of Wisconsin
- Raymond Joseph Cannon (1894–1951) – U.S. Representative
- Joseph Aloysius "Red" Dunn (1901–1957) – American football player
- William Sylvester Harley (1880–1943) – Co-founder of the Harley-Davidson Motor Company
- Charles Joseph Kersten (1902–1972) – U.S. Representative
- Patrick Joseph Lucey (1918–2014) – Governor of Wisconsin from 1971 to 1977.
- John Dann MacDonald (1916–1986) – Writer of novels
- Thomas J. O'Malley (1868–1936) – 25th lieutenant governor of Wisconsin
- August Palmisano (1928-1978) American tavern owner Milwaukee, Wisconsin.
- Henry C. "Hank" Raymonds (1924–2010) – Basketball coach
- Otto Meister (1869–1944) Theater owner in Milwaukee, Wisconsin.
