= Coles County Courthouse =

Local government building in the United States

- U.S. National Register of Historic Places
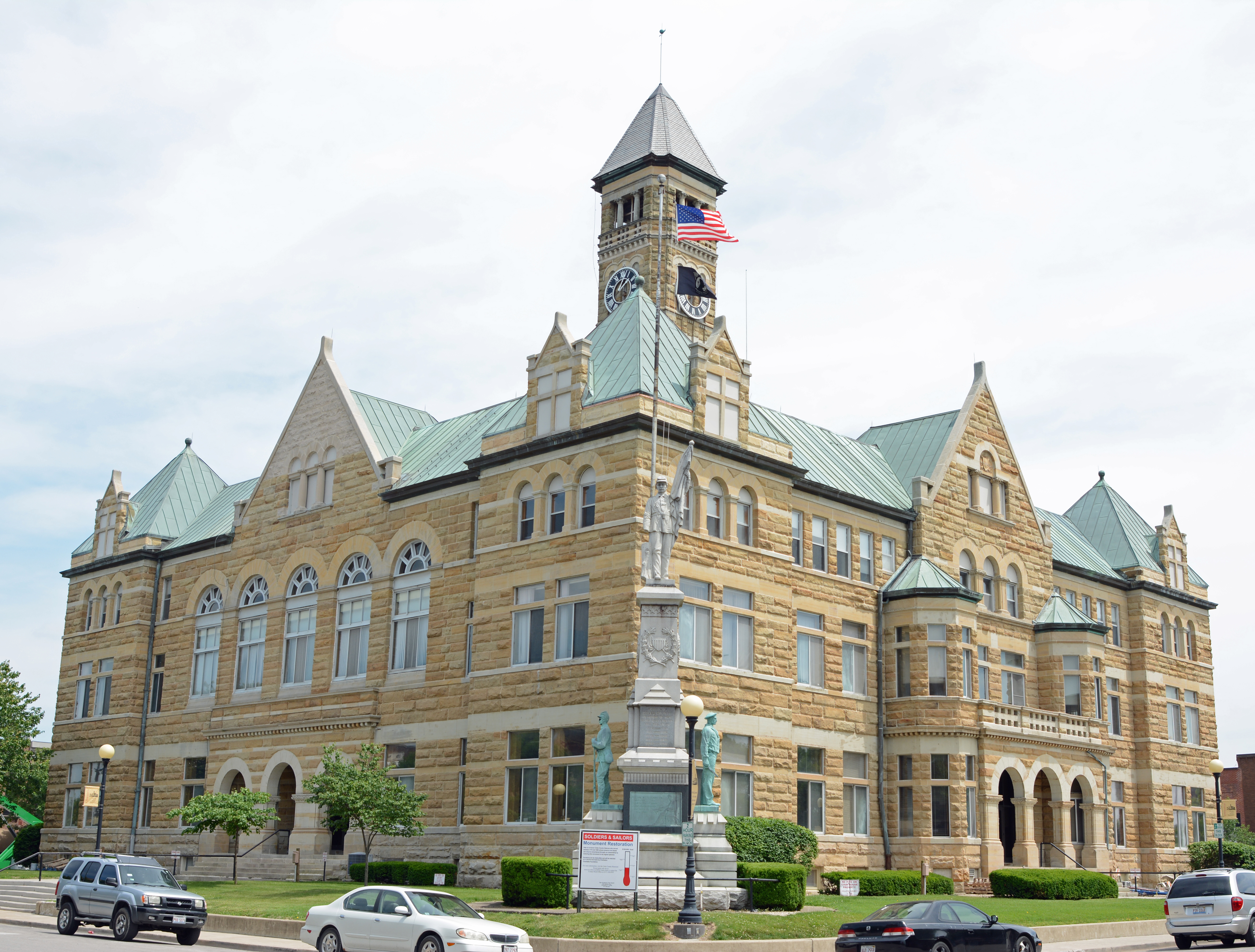

- Location within Illinois Location within the United States
- Interactive map showing the location of Coles County Courthouse
- Location: Charleston Public Sq., Charleston, Illinois
- Coordinates: 39°29′41″N 88°10′28″W
- Area: less than one acre
- Built: 1898
- Architect: C. W. Rapp
- Architectural style: Romanesque
- NRHP reference No.: 78001118
- Added to NRHP: November 28, 1978

Coles County Courthouse is a historic courthouse in Charleston, Illinois. The courthouse is located in a public square in central Charleston and houses most of Coles County, Illinois's administrative offices as well as its courts. It was built in 1898 and designed by Chicago architect C. W. Rapp in the Richardsonian Romanesque style. The building's exterior is faced in brown stone from the Embarras River; Bedford stone is used for several architectural details. The corners of the building feature pavilions topped by pyramids, and a clock tower topped with a pyramid is situated atop the center of the courthouse. The four main entrances, located on each side of the building, feature an arcaded porch with recessed doors.

The courthouse was added to the National Register of Historic Places on November 28, 1978.
