= Rapp and Rapp =

American architecture firm

C. W. & George L. Rapp

Practice information
- Key architects: C. Ward Rapp; George L. Rapp; Mason G. Rapp
- Partners: C. Ward Rapp; George L. Rapp
- Founded: 1906
- Dissolved: 1965
- Location: Chicago, Illinois

The Chicago Theatre, designed by the Rapps for Balaban & Katz and completed in 1921.

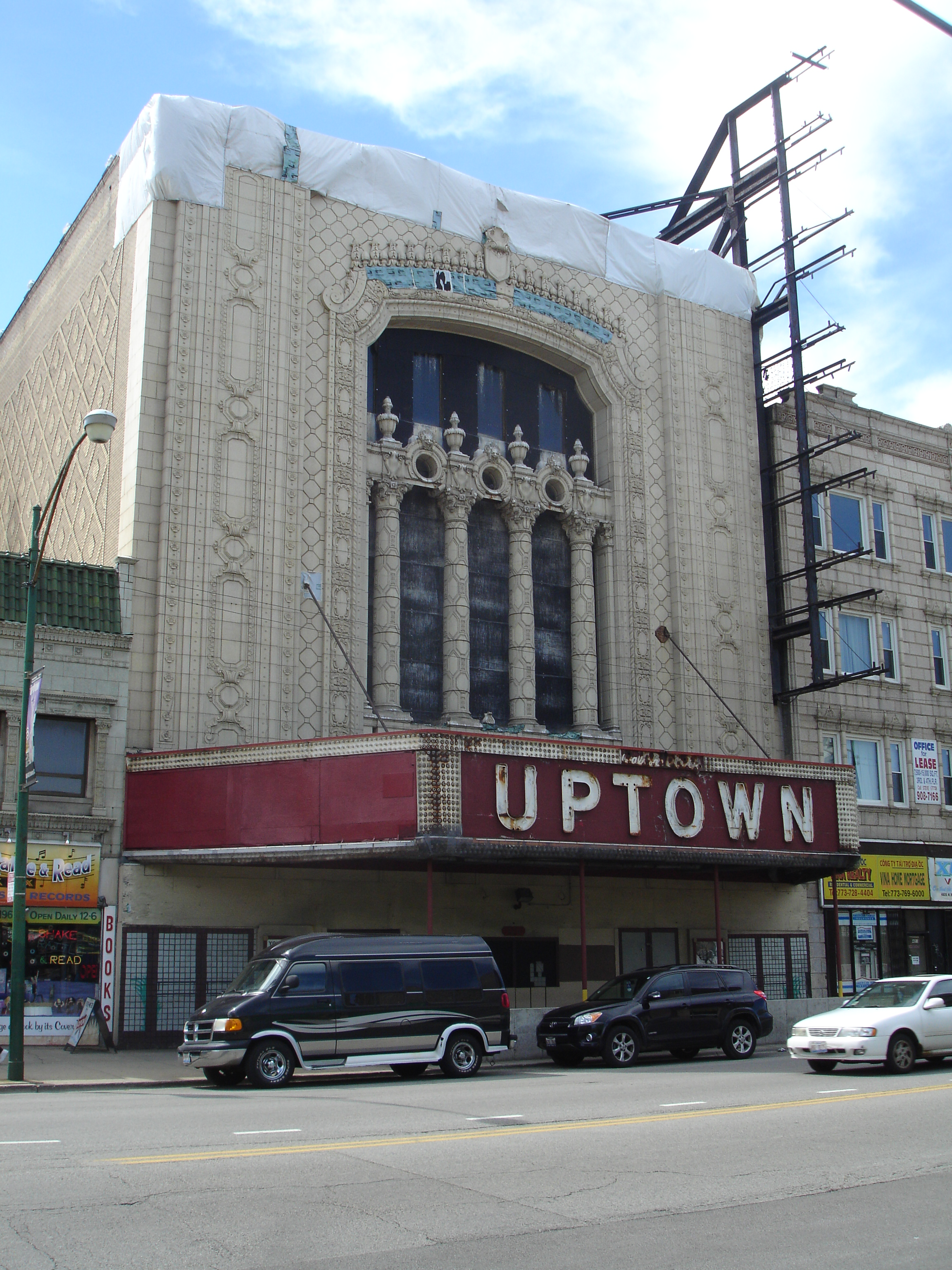
The Uptown Theatre in Chicago, completed in 1925.

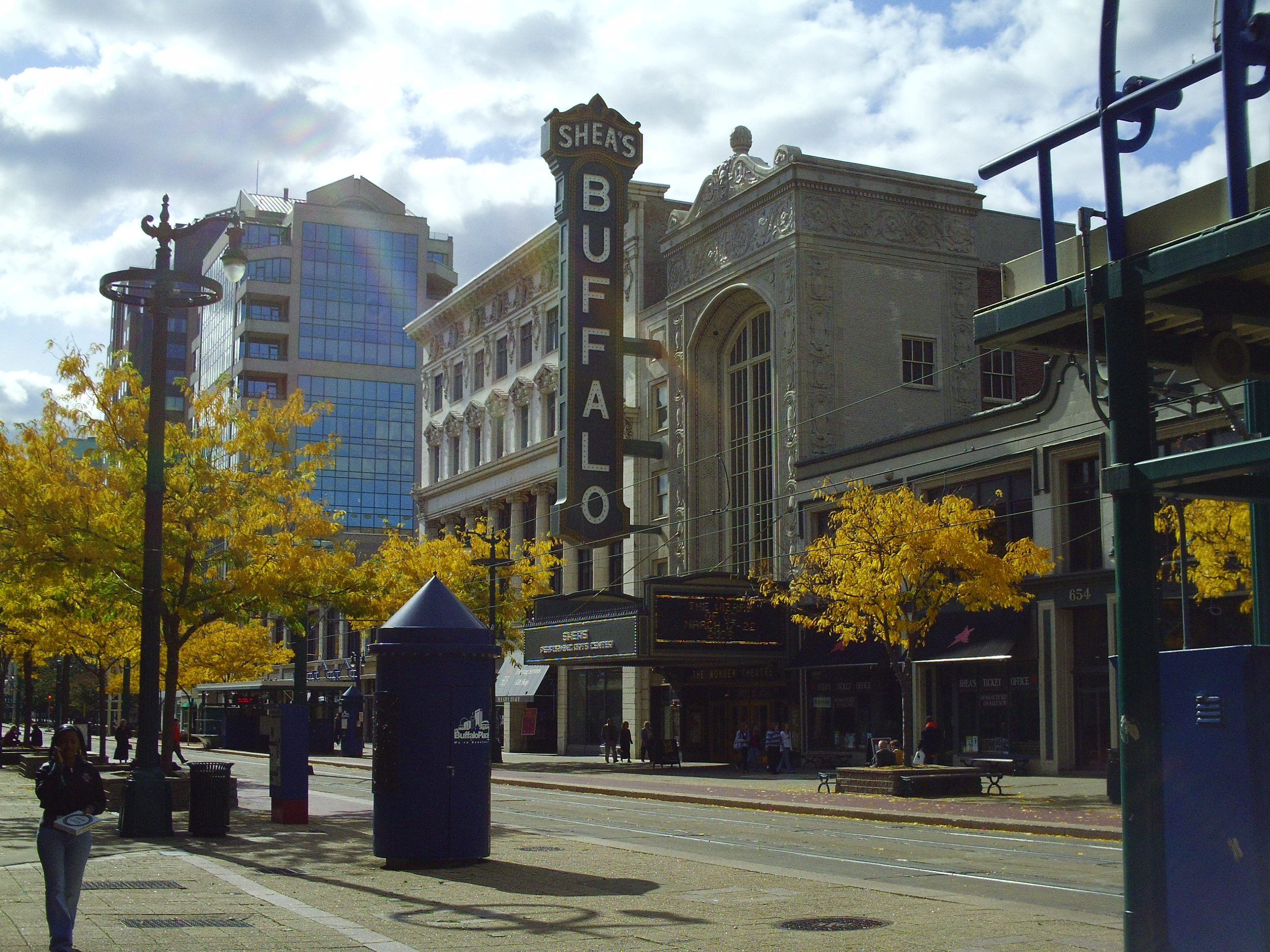
Shea's Performing Arts Center, originally Shea's Buffalo, completed in 1926.

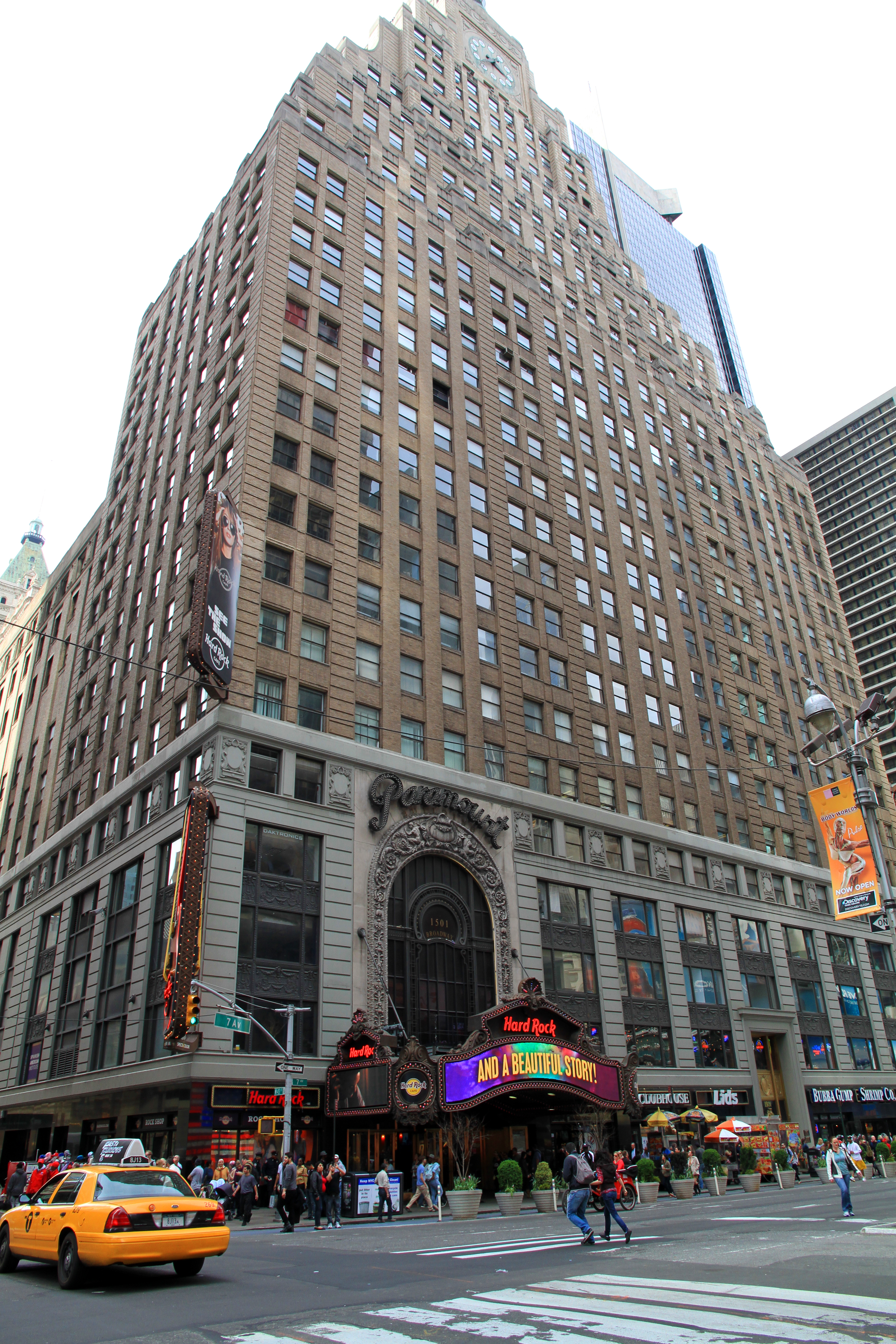
The Paramount Building in Times Square, New York City, completed in 1927.

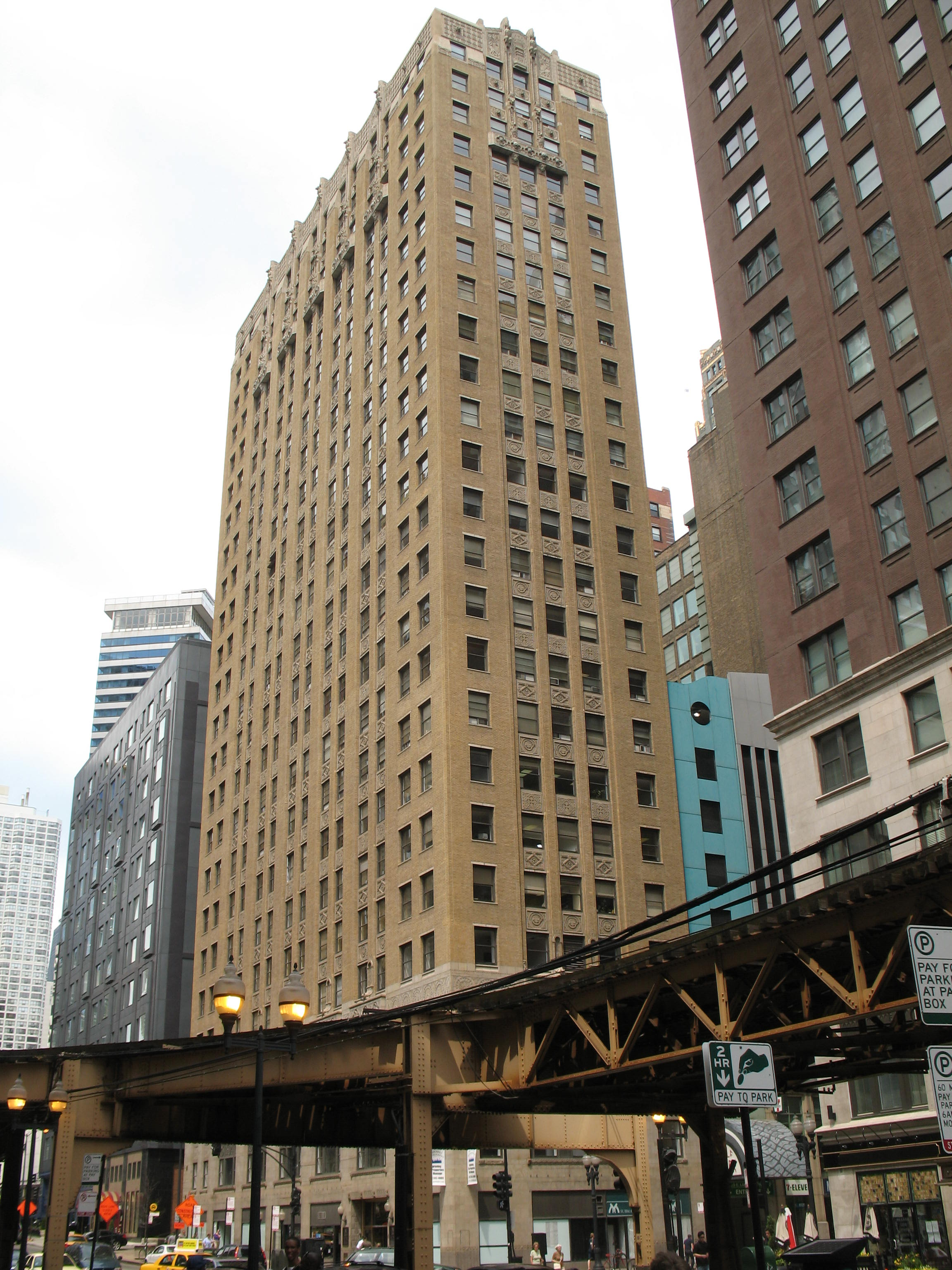
The Old Dearborn Bank Building in Chicago, completed in 1928.

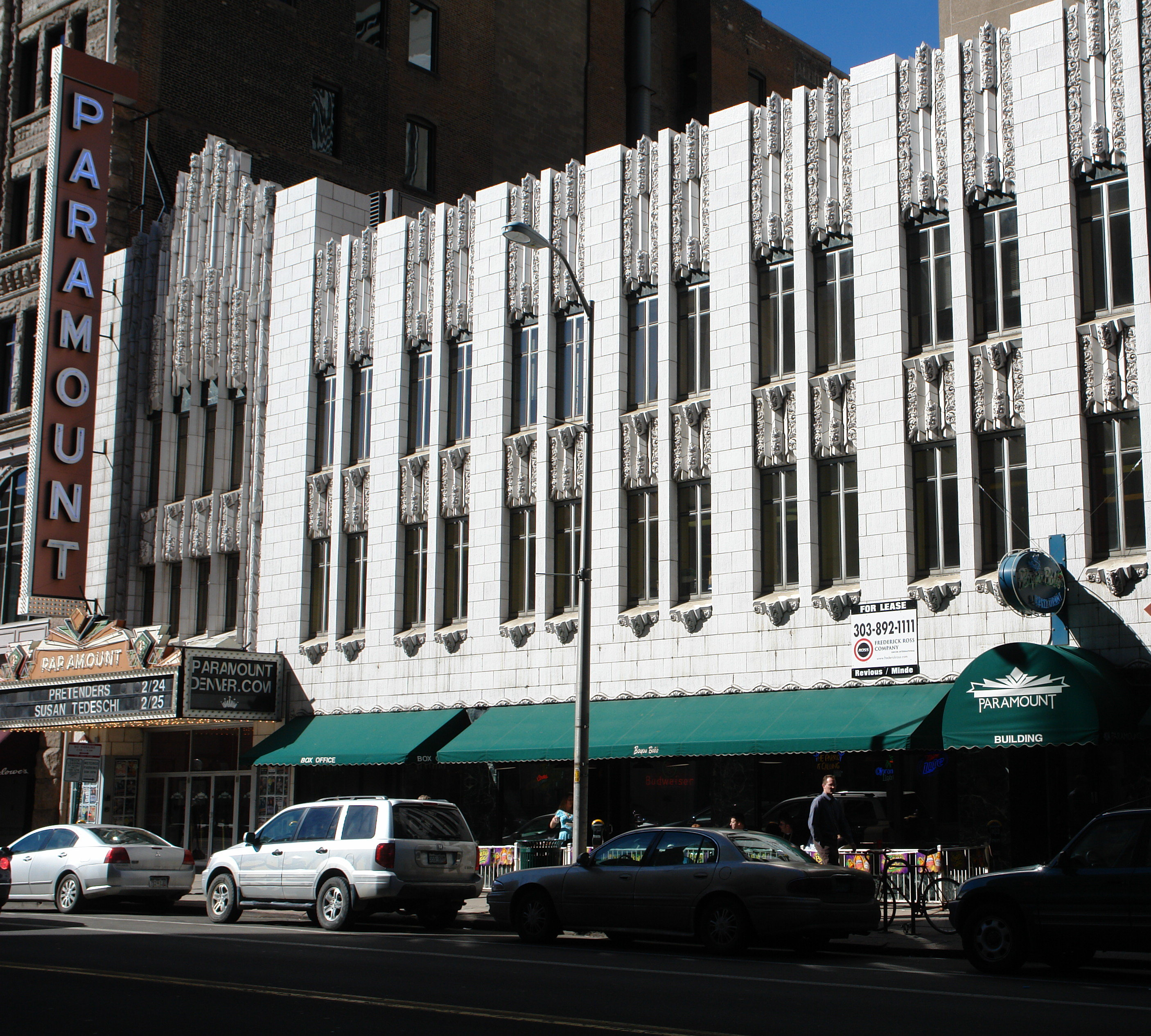
The Paramount Theatre in Denver, completed in 1930.

C. W. & George L. Rapp, commonly known as Rapp & Rapp, was an American architectural firm known for the design of movie palaces and other theatres. Active from 1906 to 1965 and based in Chicago, the office designed over 400 theatres, including the Chicago Theatre (1921), Bismarck Hotel and Theatre (1926) and Oriental Theater (1926) in Chicago, the Five Flags Center (1910) in Dubuque, Iowa and the Paramount Theatres in New York City (1926) and Aurora, Illinois (1931).

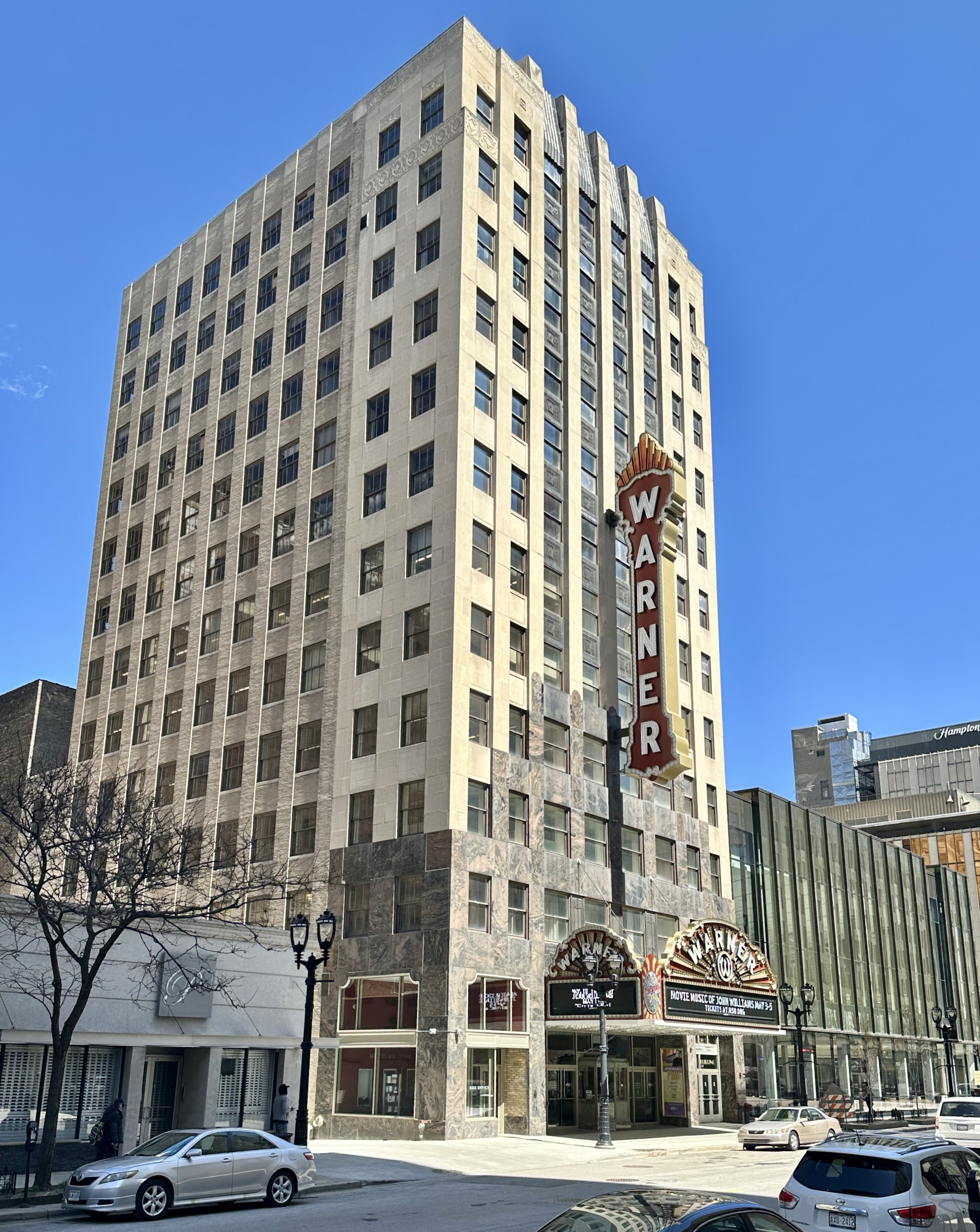
Warner Grand Theater (Milwaukee) Wisconsin built in 1931

The named partners were brothers C. Ward Rapp (1860–1926) and George L. Rapp (1878–1941), sons of a builder and natives of Carbondale, Illinois. Their Chicago practice is not to be confused with the Trinidad, Colorado practice of their brothers Isaac H. Rapp (1854–1933) and William M. Rapp (1863–1920) or the notable Cincinnati architects George W. Rapp and Walter L. Rapp, to whom they were not related.

== Biographies and history ==
Cornelius Ward Rapp was born December 26, 1860. In the 1880s he moved to Chicago, where he worked for architect Cyrus P. Thomas. In 1889, the two formed the partnership of Thomas & Rapp. This was dissolved in 1895, when both opened independent offices. Rapp's major projects over the next eleven years included Altgeld Hall (1895–96) and Wheeler Hall (1903–04) at what is now Southern Illinois University Carbondale and the Coles County Courthouse (1898–99) in Charleston. His father was superintendent of construction for both Carbondale buildings. Rapp was an independent practitioner until 1906, when he formed a partnership with his younger brother, George L. Rapp.

George Leslie Rapp was born February 16, 1878. He was educated in the School of Architecture of the University of Illinois, graduating in 1899. He then followed his brother to Chicago, where he joined the office of architect Edmund R. Krause. Of the projects completed by Krause during Rapp's employment, the best known was the Majestic Theatre, now the CIBC Theatre. After seven years with Krause he joined his brother to form the firm of C. W. & George L. Rapp, commonly known as Rapp & Rapp. Following early success with the Five Flags Center in Dubuque, Iowa, the new firm quickly specialized in theatres. In 1917 they began working with the Balaban & Katz chain of movie theatres, a relationship leading to the construction of many early movie palaces. In 1926 Paramount Pictures bought a controlling interest in Balaban & Katz, after which the Rapp office gained a national practice. C. Ward Rapp died the same year, leaving his brother to head the firm. The firm diversified its practice away from theatres during the 1930s, and designed a variety of commercial and industrial projects. During this period Rapp was joined by Mason Gerardi Rapp, son of his elder brother William M. Rapp. After George L. Rapp's retirement in 1938, Mason G. Rapp succeeded to the practice. After the death of his uncle in 1941 he renamed the firm Rapp & Rapp, which had always been its common name. In 1965 Rapp retired, and the firm was dissolved. Mason G. Rapp died in 1978.

== Legacy ==
The Rapp brothers were among a group of highly influential American theatre architects, which also included Thomas W. Lamb of New York City and John Eberson of Chicago. They were responsible for the design of some 400 theatres, most of which were built in the 1920s. They designed many movie palaces, including a number of atmospheric theatres, which utilized romantic architectural elements to evoke specific times and places. Their only surviving atmospheric theatre in Chicago is the Gateway Theatre, now the Copernicus Center, completed in 1930. If murals were to be included in the theatres, Louis Grell of Chicago was commissioned to paint them.

Many of the theatres and other buildings designed by the Rapp brothers have been listed on the United States National Register of Historic Places.

== Buildings ==
Some of the notable buildings that the firm designed include:

=== Chicago, Illinois ===
- Central Park Theatre
- Chicago Theatre
- Gateway Theatre, now Copernicus Center
- Hotel Windermere
- Jackson Shore Apartments
- New Bismarck Hotel, today "Hotel Allegro"
- Old Dearborn Bank Building, also known as 203 North Wabash Street
- Oriental Theatre, now James M. Nederlander Theatre
- Palace Theatre
- Riviera Theatre
- Tivoli Theatre
- Uptown Theatre

=== Other areas ===
Denver, Colorado

- Paramount Theatre

Aurora, Illinois

- Paramount Theatre

Champaign, Illinois

- Orpheum Theater

Galesburg, Illinois

- Orpheum Theater

Joliet, Illinois

- Rialto Square Theatre

Streator, Illinois

- The Majestic Theatre

Davenport, Iowa

- Capital Theater

Dubuque, Iowa

- Five Flags Center

Sioux City, Iowa

- Orpheum Theatre

Wichita, Kansas

- Miller Theater (1922-1972)

Ashland, Kentucky

- Paramount Arts Center

Detroit, Michigan

- Leland Hotel
- Michigan Theatre

Kansas City, Missouri

- Mainstreet Theater

St. Louis, Missouri

- Ambassador Theatre (demolished)
- St. Louis Theater (now Powell Hall)

Jersey City, New Jersey

- Loew's Jersey Theater

Buffalo, New York

- Shea's Theatre

Middletown, New York

- Paramount Theatre

New York City

- 1501 Broadway, Times Square
- Paramount Theatre, Brooklyn
- Paramount Theatre, Times Square
- Kings Theatre, Brooklyn (formerly Loew's Kings Theater)

Cincinnati, Ohio

- Palace Theatre (demolished)

Cleveland, Ohio

- Palace Theatre

Youngstown, Ohio

- Warner Theatre (now DeYor Performing Arts Center)

Tulsa, Oklahoma

- Akdar Theatre 1922-1964

Portland, Oregon

- Paramount Theatre (now Arlene Schnitzer Concert Hall)

Erie, Pennsylvania

- Warner Theatre

Pittsburgh, Pennsylvania

- Loew's Penn Theatre (now Heinz Hall)

West Chester, Pennsylvania

- Warner Theatre

Providence, Rhode Island

- Loew's State Theatre, now the Providence Performing Arts Center

Mitchell, South Dakota

- Corn Palace

Chattanooga, Tennessee

- Tivoli Theatre

Memphis, Tennessee

- Orpheum Theatre

Charlottesville, Virginia

- Paramount Theater

Seattle, Washington

- Paramount Theatre

Baraboo, Wisconsin

- Al. Ringling Theater

Madison, Wisconsin

- Orpheum Theatre (Madison, Wisconsin)

Milwaukee, Wisconsin

- Bradley Symphony Center, formerly the Warner Grand Theater
- Modjeska Theater
- Uptown Theatre (demolished)
- Wisconsin Theater (demolished)

Kenosha, Wisconsin

- Gateway Theatre, now the Rhode Center for the Arts

Racine, Wisconsin

- RKO Main Street Theatre
