= Butterfly Theater =

Defunct Wisconsin theater

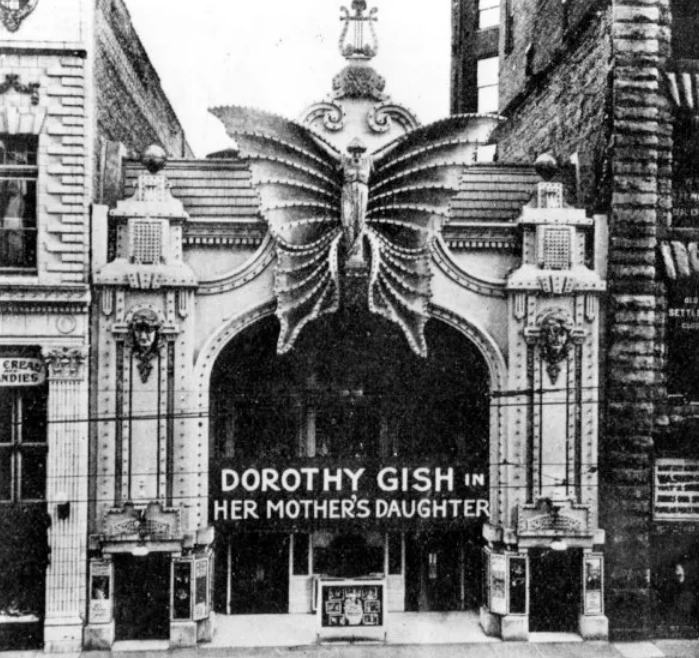
- 1915 image of the Butterfly Theater
- Interactive map of Butterfly Theater
- Address: 212 W. Wisconsin Avenue; Milwaukee, Wisconsin; United States
- Coordinates: 43°02′21″N 87°54′49″W
- Owner: Otto Meister
- Capacity: 1,500
- Type: Movie palace

Construction
- Opened: September 2, 1911
- Closed: 1930
- Demolished: 1930
- Years active: 1911–1930
- Architect: August Willmanns

The Butterfly Theater opened in Milwaukee, Wisconsin, United States, on September 2, 1911. The theater had 1,500 seats and it featured a US$10,000 (equivalent to $345,536 in 2025) pipe organ. The facade was adorned by a 27 ft (8.2 m) wide butterfly which was illuminated by 1,000 light bulbs. The theater had marble floors, canaries in gilded cages, crystal chandeliers and a mirrored staircase.

The land used for the theater was the former site of two nickelodeon theaters. The theaters were razed and the Butterfly Theater was constructed on the site and operated from 1911 to 1930. The theater claimed to be almost fireproof. The Butterfly Theater was razed in 1930 and the Warner Movie Palace opened on the site in 1931.

== History ==
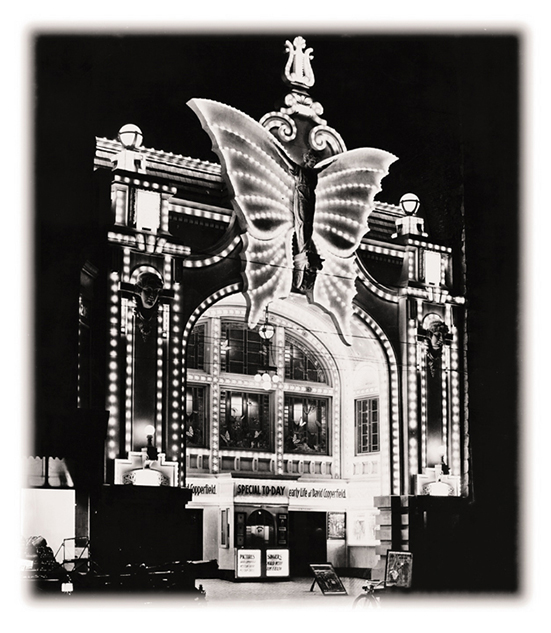
Butterfly Theater at night 1911. On the marque "The Early Life of David Copperfield" released October 17, 1911

The theater was built by Otto Meister and opened on September 2, 1911; it became nationally known. The theater opened to 1,500 people and showed several movies. On opening night, a six-piece orchestra played and the Loos Brothers sang a duet called "My Hula Hula Love".

The building permit was issued May 7, 1911, and the Milwaukee Wrecking company began demolishing buildings the lot. The land was the site of two nickelodeon theaters. Meister partnered with John R. Freuler to create the Central Amusement Company which controlled the Butterfly Theater and also controlled the Vaudette, the Atlas and the Climax Theaters.

In July 1911, construction began on the steel work for the building which was on Grand Avenue between Second and Third streets. The Milwaukee Sentinel reported that the building would be nearly fireproof and the cost of fireproofing was US$10,000 (equivalent to $345,536 in 2025). One of the advertising claims was that the air in the theater was "completely changed every 3 minutes". One reason some theater-goers feared stagnant air was the concern about tuberculosis. In America, tuberculosis was also known by the name "consumption" and it was the disease that killed more people than any other from 1800 to 1922 in urban areas.

Admission to the theater was 10 cents (equivalent to $3 in 2025) and the theater had a 1,500-seat capacity. At the time, theaters regularly charged a nickel for admittance, but the Butterfly kept their price at 10 cents. During World War I, the Butterfly raised their price to 25 cents (equivalent to $5 in 2025).

The architect of record was August Willmanns. Willmanns selected theater embellishments and decorative plaster items pre-made from a catalogue. At the time, many businesses offered interior decorative plaster pieces and ready-made building facades. The building cost was US$200,000 (equivalent to $6,910,714 in 2025). The theater hired a doorman who said he was Oscar award–winning actor and boxer Victor McLaglen, but he was an imposter. Victor McLaglen exposed the man as a fraud and revealed that the man was actually his brother Leopold McLaglen.

In 1929, a film in the projection room of the theater caught fire. The movie patrons had to evacuate as smoke was seen coming out of the windows. The film operator prevented the fire from spreading long enough for firemen to arrive and stop the fire. In December 1929, Warner Brothers negotiated to purchase the Butterfly Theater and other buildings on the site. They planned to build a 10-12 story building with a 2,500 seat capacity. By January 1929, it was confirmed that the Butterfly was sold and it would be razed to make way for the US$3 million (equivalent to $57,818,725 in 2025) theater and hotel. In February 1930, workers began demolishing the Butterfly Theater. The theater was demolished in 1930, and the Warner Theatre was built and opened on the site in 1931.

== Description ==
The theater's facade featured a terra-cotta butterfly with 1,000 light bulbs. The butterfly measured 27 ft (8.2 m) wide and at the center of the butterfly was a woman's body. The facade had a total of 3,000 lightbulbs. Many of the decorative items including the butterfly were ordered pre-made. The butterfly was seen in a Decorators Supply Company catalog. A Chicago company supplied decorative elements and terra-cotta items.

The seats were leather-upholstered. On the main floor there were 25 box-seats. The interior had marble floors and canaries in gilded cages. There were crystal chandeliers and a mirrored staircase. The theater had a $10,000 (equivalent to $345,536 in 2025) pipe organ with an orchestra and opera singers. Mrs. Margaret L. Battin of Milwaukee was the organ player.

== Gallery ==
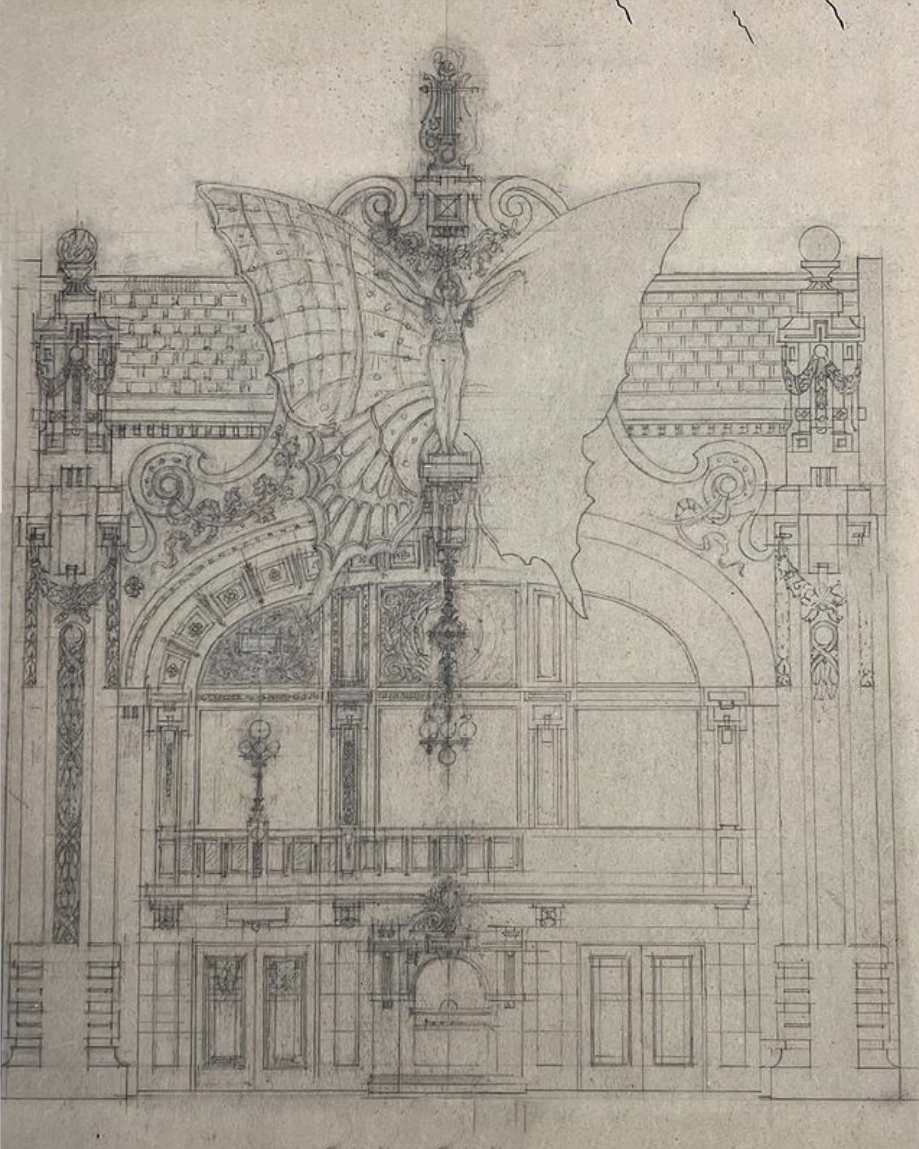
Butterfly Theater front elevation architectural drawing 1911

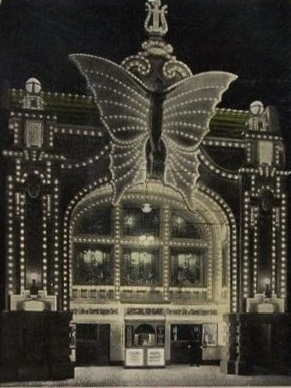
Butterfly Theater at night (1912)

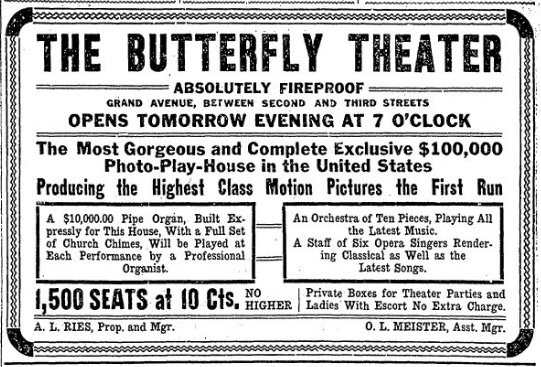
Butterfly Theater advertisement Milwaukee Sentinel September 1, 1911

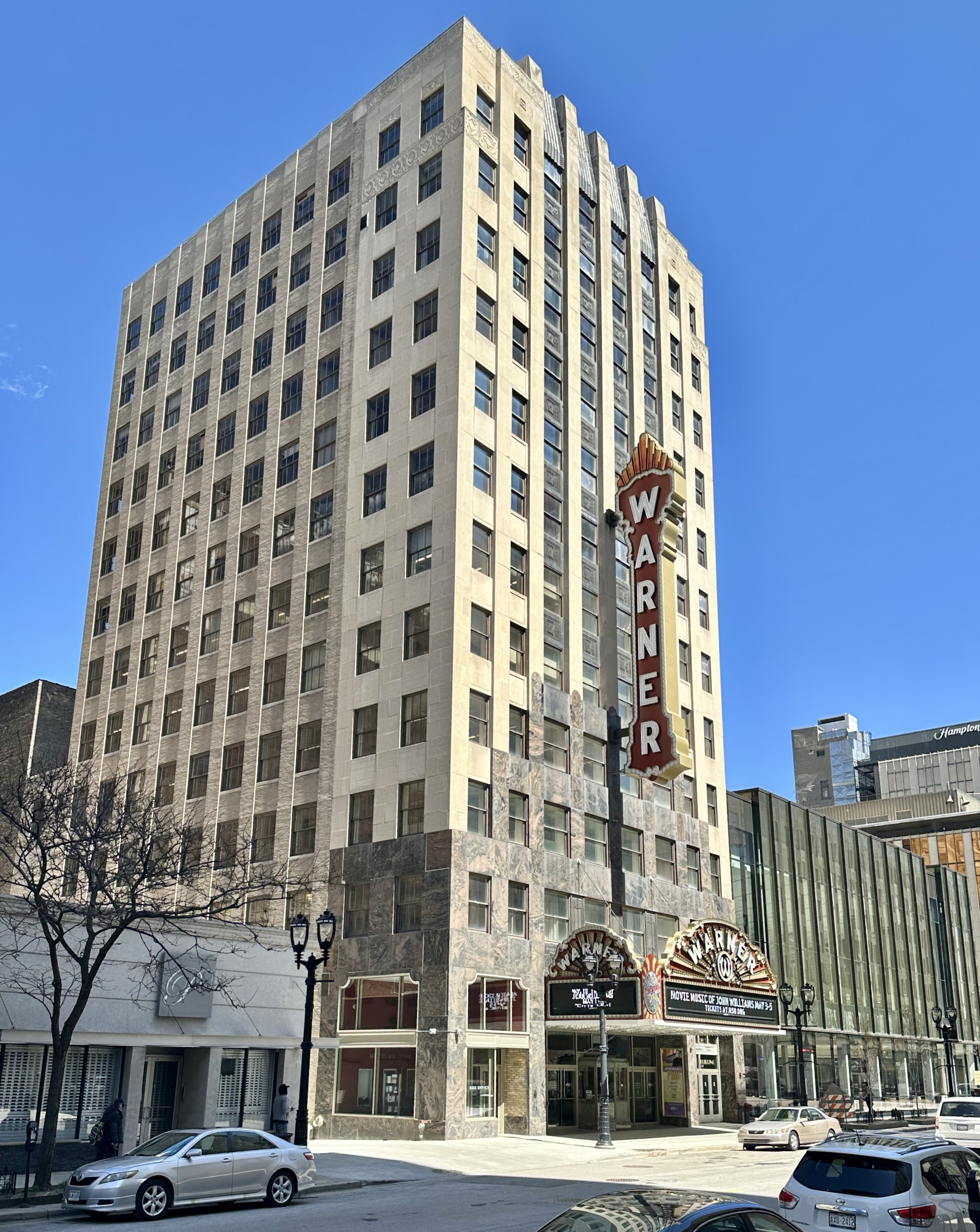
Warner Grand Theater (Milwaukee) on the site of the Butterfly Theater

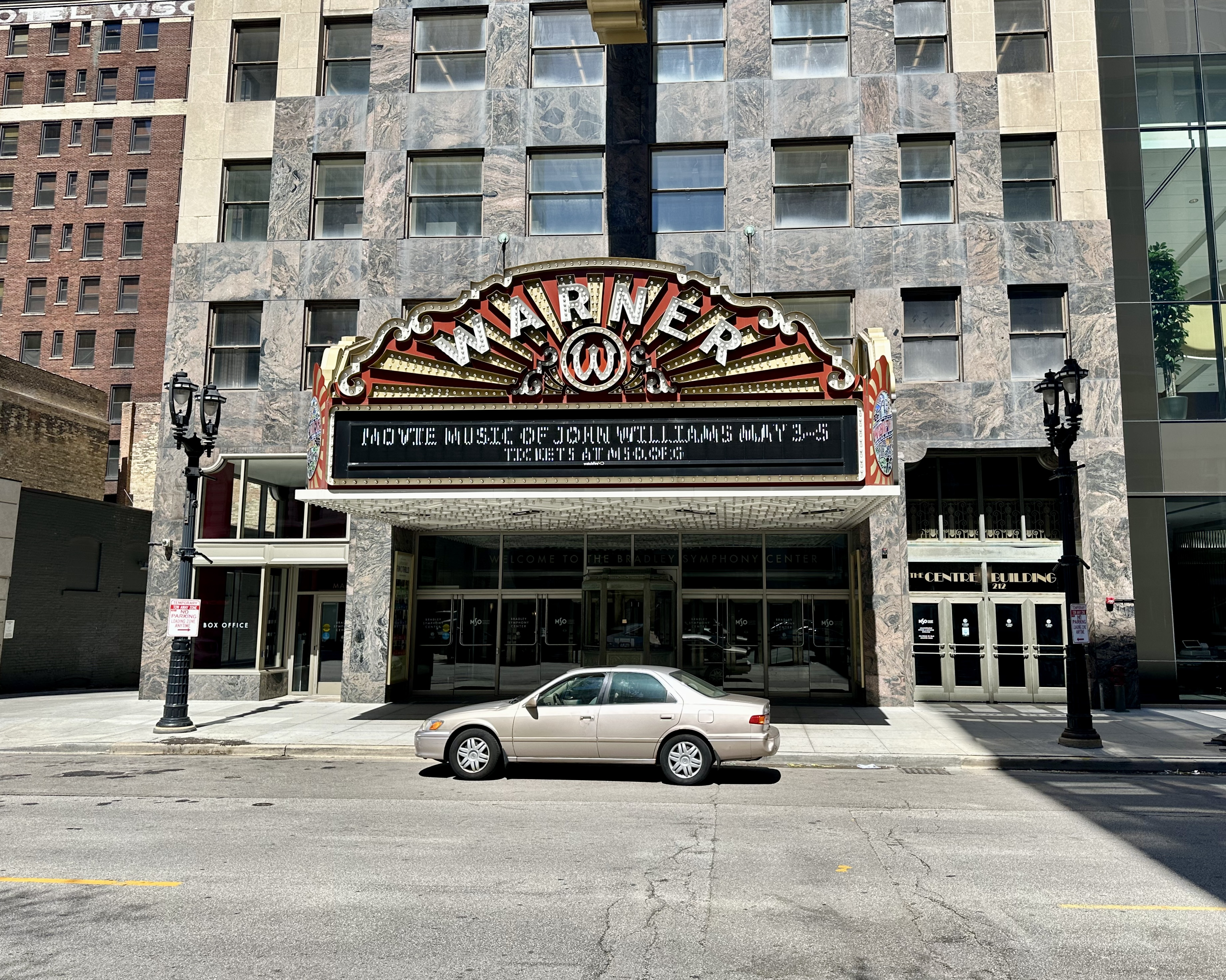
Warner Grand Theater (Milwaukee) facing Wisconsin Avenue
