= Paramount Theatre (Middletown, New York) =

Historic building in Middletown, New York

- U.S. National Register of Historic Places
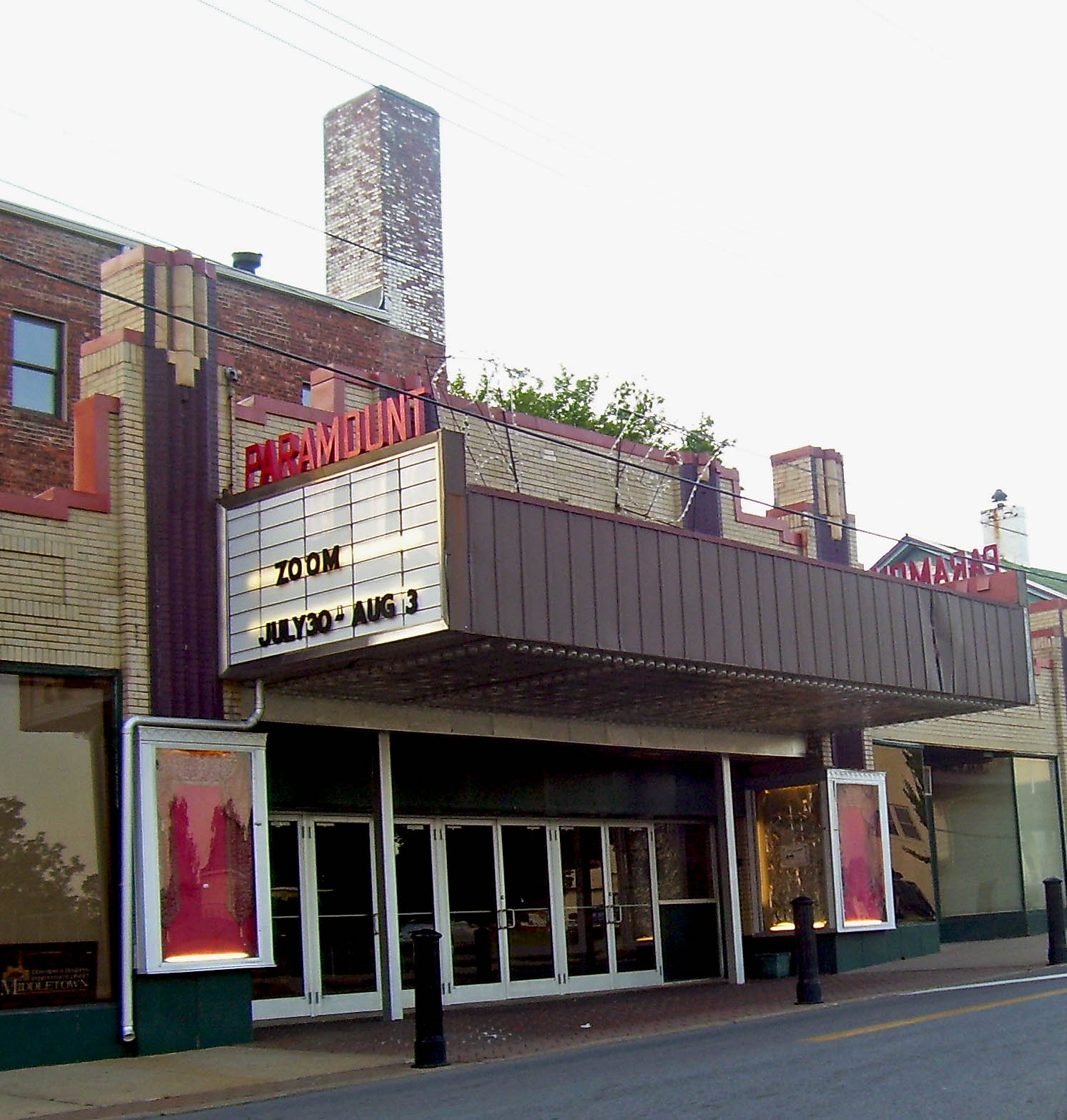
- Paramount Theatre marquee in 2007
- Location: 17 South St., Middletown, NY
- Coordinates: 41°26′44″N 74°25′16″W
- Built: 1930
- Architect: Rapp and Rapp
- Architectural style: Art Deco
- Website: www.middletownparamount.com
- NRHP reference No.: 02000136
- Added to NRHP: March 6, 2002

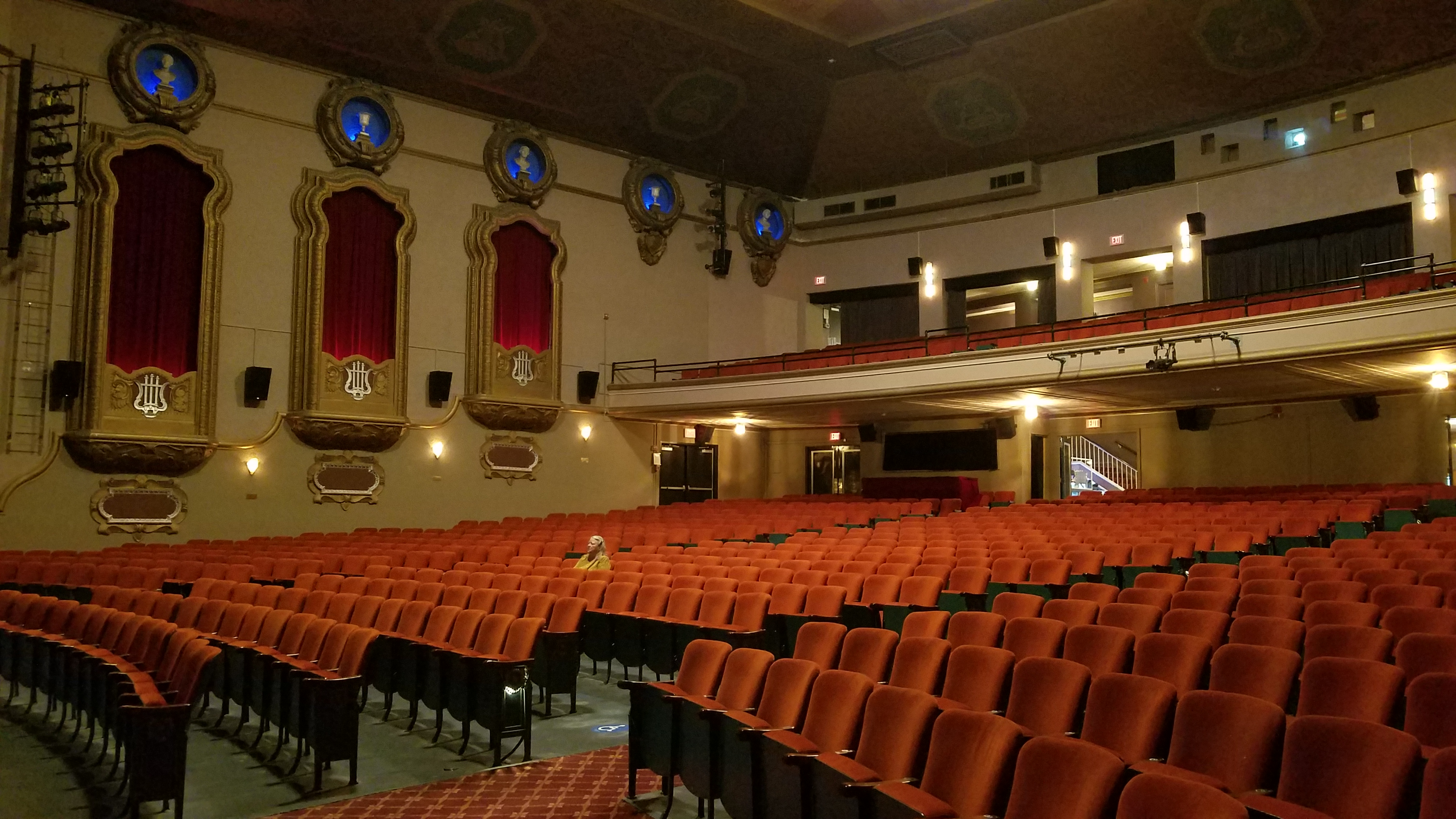
Theatre seating area

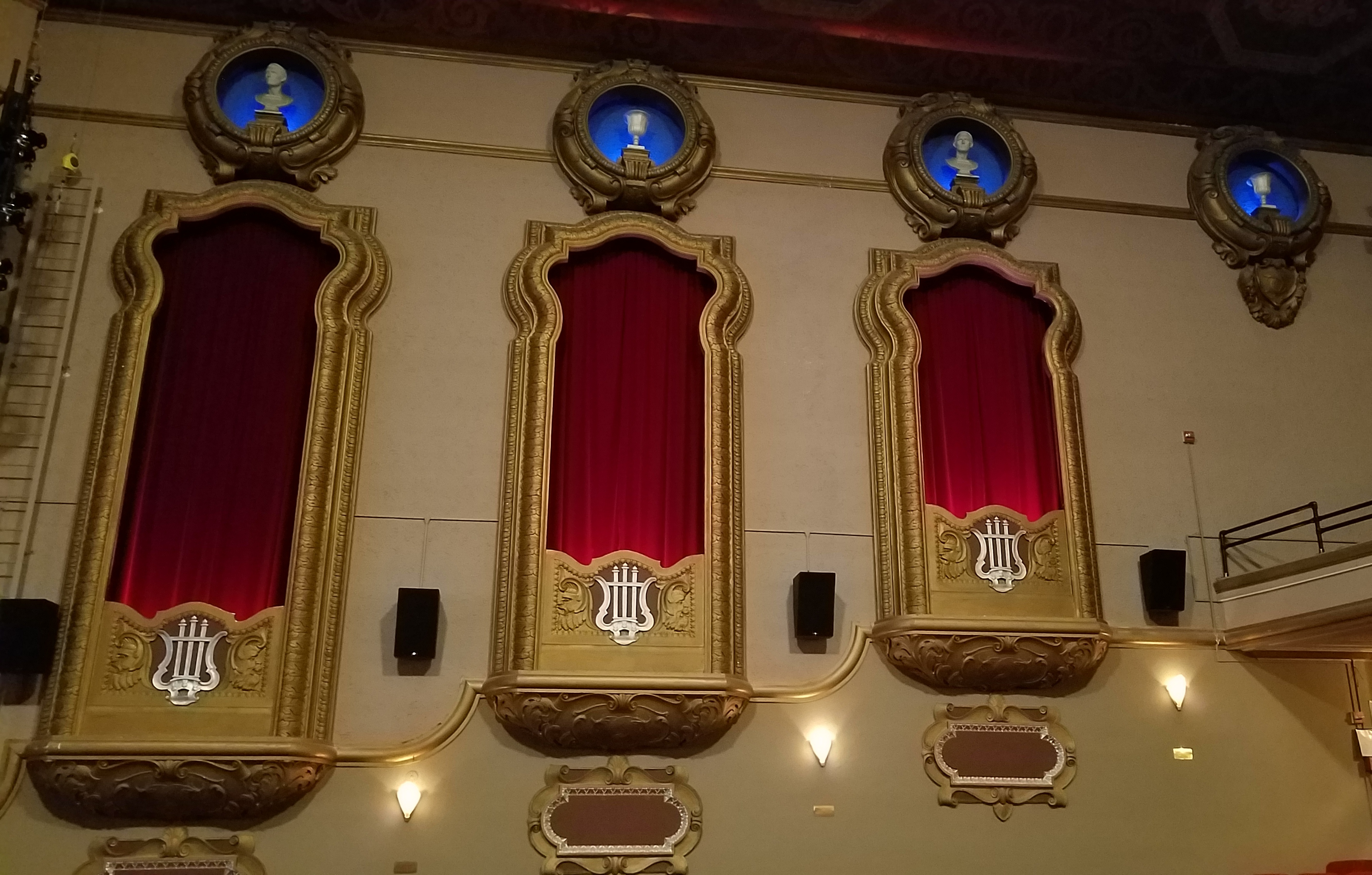
Faux opera boxes

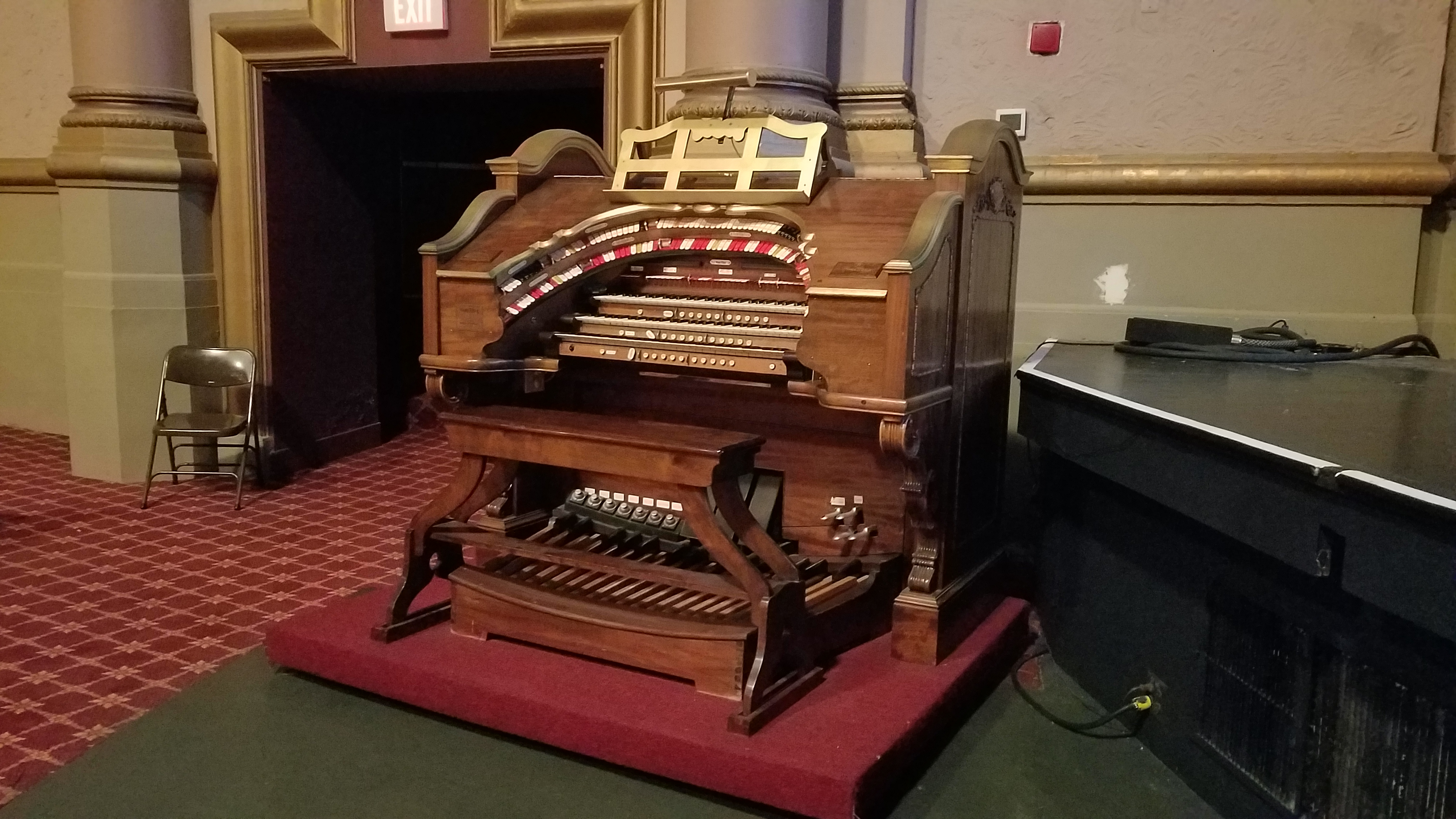
Mighty Wurlitzer Theatre Pipe Organ

The Paramount Theatre is a historic theater located at 17 South Street in Middletown, New York, United States. It was built in 1930 in an Art Deco style, a twin to the Paramount Theater in Peekskill, across the Hudson River. It was included in the National Register of Historic Places in 2002.

Paramount-Publix Corporation (now Paramount Pictures) built and opened the building on June 12, 1930, with a celebration that included a parade at noon, a musical performance by the Paramount Symphony Orchestra, and the first movie, The Big Pond, starring Maurice Chevalier and Claudette Colbert at 6 p.m. The feature film was preceded by a newsreel, a short film about Middletown and its citizens and a welcome film starring Buddy Rogers.

Paramount-Publix sold the theater after the U.S. Supreme Court's 1948 United States v. Paramount Pictures, Inc. decision, which required the movie studios to divest themselves of their theater chains. ABC, a successor corporation, owned the Paramount until 1973 when it sold it to Hallmark Releasing. After several other owners, it closed five years later. In 1979, the city took title when back taxes went unpaid.

Two years later, the Arts Council of Orange County bought the building and renovated it into a performing arts center. An apron was added to the stage, and a pavilion on the back of the building provided dressing room space. It was reopened in 1985. The building was added to the National Register of Historic Places in 2002. The theatre hosts a variety acts and events, as well as art exhibits, lectures, civic fundraisers, dance recitals, business receptions, school theatre series, performing arts summer camp and some film features.

The New York Theater Organ Society installed the Wurlitzer organ from the Clairidge Theater in Montclair, New Jersey. The Paramount's organ's original keyboard is now part of the organ at the Orpheum Theater in Phoenix, Arizona.

The Hoboken International Film Festival takes place annually at the theater.
