= Orpheum Theater (Galesburg) =

Historic theatre in Illinois

Coordinates: 40.9468°N 90.3661°W

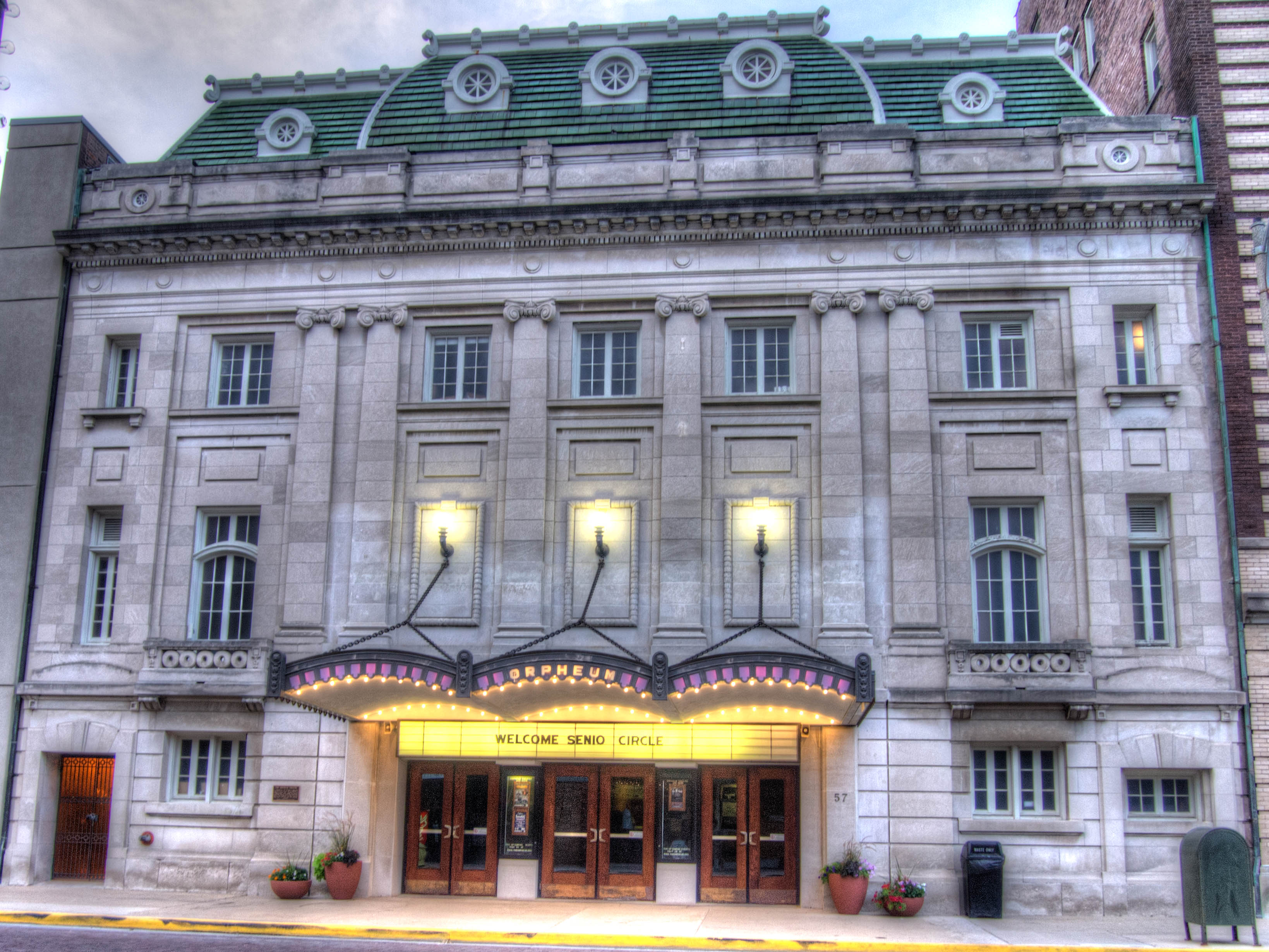
The Orpheum Theater in 2012

The Orpheum Theatre, originally opened in August 1916, stands on Kellogg Street in downtown Galesburg, Illinois. The Orpheum's elegance and long history made the theatre a landmark in Galesburg which boasts other landmarks such as Carl Sandburg's Birthplace, the Galesburg Railroad Museum, and Knox College, which hosted an Abraham Lincoln-Stephen Douglas debate.

== Building ==
The Galesburg Orpheum was built in 1916. In 1915, owner William J. Olson signed a contract with Harvey A. Craig to lease the Orpheum and provide its management, upon the completion of the theatre. At the time, Olson also owned the Gaiety Theatre on the corner of Cherry and Simmons Street. Olson wanted the Orpheum to outclass its competitors, attracting the most popular acts and fashionable audiences. In order to accomplish this purpose, Craig and Olson toured the Midwest viewing other theaters.

C.W. and George L. Rapp of Chicago were hired to build the Orpheum. Rapp and Rapp owned one of the largest architectural firms in the United States, specializing in building theaters: Chicago, Pittsburgh, Manhattan, and New Jersey. The Rapps believed that “showplaces should have all the trappings of the rich, but be accessible to all.”

Early in 1915, Craig and Olson took sub-bids for work on the Orpheum. Delays in the bidding process occurred because Rapp and Rapp failed to send duplicate copies of the building plans to sub-contractors. Finally, in August 1915, all the sub-bids had been submitted, and contracts were awarded. The design of the Orpheum was a blend of “Italian Renaissance and Second Empire Style of the 19th Century France with flourishes of classical, baroque, and art nouveau.” The lobby boasted a crystal chandelier and French-mirror windows. Iconic columns and French windows done by an Italian craftsman, added to the Orpheum's elegance.

The theatre's main floor seated 550 patrons, the balcony 500, and 15 boxes on the mezzanine level. The seats and carpet were old rose with trimmings in ivory. The Orpheum was built to be fire resistant, including fireproof curtains and chairs. The theatre was considered modern in its acoustics, stage construction, ventilation system, and dressing rooms equipped with running water.

Several delays occurred in the building process. Project manager Henry Duvall took sick, Mandel Brothers had to touch-up the decoration, the insurance inspector was delayed in publishing a rate, a contractor was postponed in laying cement, no temporary heat was available for the theatre, and a hundred chairs from the American Seating Company were damaged in transport. Although originally planned to open April 3, delays pushed the theatre opening into August.

== Early history ==
On August 21, 1916, the theatre opened in “a blaze of glory.” Tickets sold out early and some 1,300 theatergoers attended. The first program consisted of five vaudeville acts, two reels of motion pictures, preceded by introductory speeches by William J. Olson and Illinois Supreme Court Justice C.C. Craig. One opening night patron called the Orpheum “the finest house of its size in the whole United States."

During its early history, the Orpheum primarily featured vaudeville, the most popular form of theater entertainment throughout the early 20th century, “a series of short variety acts" with actors, dancers, jugglers, musicians, and magicians. As in the circus, these performers traveled from city to city on the Orpheum circuit. Galesburg's Orpheum Theatre operated on the Orpheum Circuit, and hosted many famous vaudeville stars during its heyday—Houdini, George Burns, Jack Benny, Al Jolson, and the Marx brothers.

Vaudeville reached the height of its popularity in 1928 when there were more than 1000 vaudeville theaters in the United States. By this time, short films had become part of the vaudeville programs, and were slowly gaining popularity. Vaudeville declined during the 1930s with the growth of both radio and the movies. Cinemas were cheaper than vaudeville, because live performances were more expensive to produce. The Orpheum Theatre like other vaudeville theaters declined and was sold to the Great States Theaters in 1935. 1 In order to become a cinema, the theatre underwent renovations: the French windows and bass work were removed, box seats in the mezzanine replaced, and the crystal chandelier was replaced.

In 1940, the theatre hosted the premiere of “Those Were the Days (at Good Old Siwash),” a film based on a series of popular short stories by George Helgesen Fitch. Fitch had written the stories, originally published in the Saturday Evening Post, about a fictional college based on the real-life Knox College. The film was largely shot on location in Galesburg, and featured some three hundred Knox students as extras along with William Holden, Ezra Stone, and Judy Barrett.

The Orpheum continued showing films through the 1980s. In 1974, Kerasotes Theaters leased the Orpheum from the Great States Theater of Chicago, and in 1978, bought the building. Under Kerasotes management the Orpheum showed first-run films.

On November 18, 1982 the Orpheum Theatre closed: due to the rise of malls containing cinemas with multiple screens, the inability to screen more than one film at a time, and limited parking space. The Orpheum was expensive: new paint, carpets, and an air conditioner cost Kerasotes Theaters over $70,000. After Kerasotes closed the Orpheum, the theatre stood empty.

== Modern history ==
In August 1983, the Knox County Board voted to form a Civic Center Committee to raise funds for the restoration and remodeling of the theatre. In December of the following year, Kerasotes Theaters deeded the Orpheum to the Committee. The transaction involved no money, but required the Orpheum not to show first-run films that might compete with Kerasotes business. The Prairie Players Community Theater presented their money to the Orpheum Theater Project Committee, which directed the details of the renovation. A portion of this money was used to determine whether the community could support the theatre. The Committee also investigated the cost of renovations, a study necessary before applying for state grants.

The Committee made efforts to raise money for the renovation locally, then applied to the state of Illinois in July 1984, for a $2 million grant from the Department of Commerce and Community Affairs (DCCA). Governor James Thompson signed the bill for $19 million in bonds toward state projects. Then, the state legislature debated about giving money to the Orpheum. In February 1985, a grant was awarded to the Orpheum, but the project had to wait an additional eleven months before the funds became available.

Originally, the DCCA planned to sell bonds immediately, but delays abounded. Debt service on the Orpheum bonds was supposed to be paid from a tax on pari-mutual betting at the Illinois race tracks, but on August 1, 1984 the Arlington Park Race Track burned down, eliminating this source of revenue. The fire, a decline in statewide betting, and a tax break given to race track owners by Illinois Legislature, left the DCCA with insufficient security and forced it to pay higher interest on bonds sold before 1985. Afraid that its bond rating would be too low, the DCCA chose to wait until December 1985 to sell the bonds.

Once the bonds were sold, the Authority had to reach an agreement with the State for the funds. The original agreement entitled the Authority to receive all $2 million, but the state reworded the agreement to withhold $200,000. The Authority had orinigally planned to earn $100,000 from interest on the grant, but the Illinois Grant Recovery Act required the interest be returned to the state. At one point the Authority considered ligation to force the state to pay interest, but attorneys decided that a court battle could take years and would further delay the grant.

On April 11, 1986, a check for $1.8 million arrived in Galesburg. The agreement stated that the Authority would invest the money and on the completion of the renovation, the DCCA would either take the excess interest or pay the difference to equal the promised $2 million if the Authority earned less. Because of these delays, the Committee faced new problems: the boiler went out, a pipe in the theatre burst, its funds dwindled to $3,000, and the cost of construction increased five percent. Rolland Killian, the project architect, had originally expected to start work on the theatre seventeen months earlier. Because the cost of materials had risen, plans for the renovation were revised to accommodate higher prices and the missing $200,000. New plans called for a contingency fund in case something else went wrong, and budgeted for movie projection equipment and a $22,000 grand piano.

As the project got underway a dispute arose between the Orpheum Theatre Management Committee and the Knox County Civic Center (KCCC). The Committee's job was to handle theatre operations, but they did so under the authority of the KCCC, with no power to make independent decisions. This restriction hindered the Committee's ability to book acts for the theatre. The Committee drew up a new constitution and by-laws enabling it to exercise greater power to make decisions. The KCCC attorney rewrote the Committee's constitution, which continued its subordination to the KCCC and required KCCC's approval for all expenses over $2,500. Finally, after negotiations, the KCCC and Committee agreed to work together on a new constitution.

As the plans for the renovations were finalized, a dispute broke out about the Critic's Square, a concession area. The KCCC planned for a concession area on the mezzanine level, as well as for a marquee and new doors. Because construction costs rose, the theatre had to scale back the renovations. A compromise dropped the marquee and doors but kept the Critic's Square.

Another difficulty was the location of the concession area on the mezzanine level, inaccessible to handicapped and arguably in violation of the Environmental Barriers Act of September 1985. The KCCC argued its plans for the concession fell under an earlier law. A state review decided the Environmental Barriers Act did, in fact, apply to the theatre: the Critic's Square must be handicapped accessible, thru an elevator or a lift. Instead, the KCCC scrapped plans for Critic's Square on the mezzanine level and placed it in the lobby.

With this dispute settled, renovations moved forward. In 1988, the Committee began to plan for opening night. The opening had been moved back several times, before the Committee decided on the weekend of May 6–8, 1988. The Committee selected the Henry Mancini Orchestra as the opening night performance along with other events including the showing of Around the World in 80 Days and a cocktail party. On May 5, 1988 theatre doors opened for the first time in over 5 years, the Henry Mancini Orchestra played to a sold-out crowd of 970. Mancini dubbed the theatre a “Little Jewel box.” Orpheum launched the Red Carpet series to bring world class acts into the theatre, but in the fall of 2009, the theatre was forced to cancel the series due to high production costs and low ticket sales. But the series was reinstated in 2010 and the Theatre and its Red Carpet Series continued to thrive.

Funding for the theatre was a major problem. In 2000, the City of Galesburg gave the Orpheum 2% of the city's Hotel and Motel tax funds, up to $100,000 per year. In 2006, the Orpheum was awarded 501(c)3 non-profit status. In 2009, the KCCC considered scaling back theatre operations because of the lack of money. Ticket sales were down, repairs were required, the boiler needed to be replaced, State funds for the theatre were slashed, and the city's Hotel and Motel tax was producing less revenue. According to a December 2010 article, the Orpheum was posting a $141,000+ profit and attendance exceeded its goal.

In 2016 the Orpheum celebrated 100 years. Today the theatre operates Youth Entertainment Series (YES) a free introduction to theater for area students. They also host plays, magicians, concerts, and shows from a variety of different performers.
