= Jackson Shore Apartments =

Apartment building in Chicago, Illinois

- U.S. National Register of Historic Places
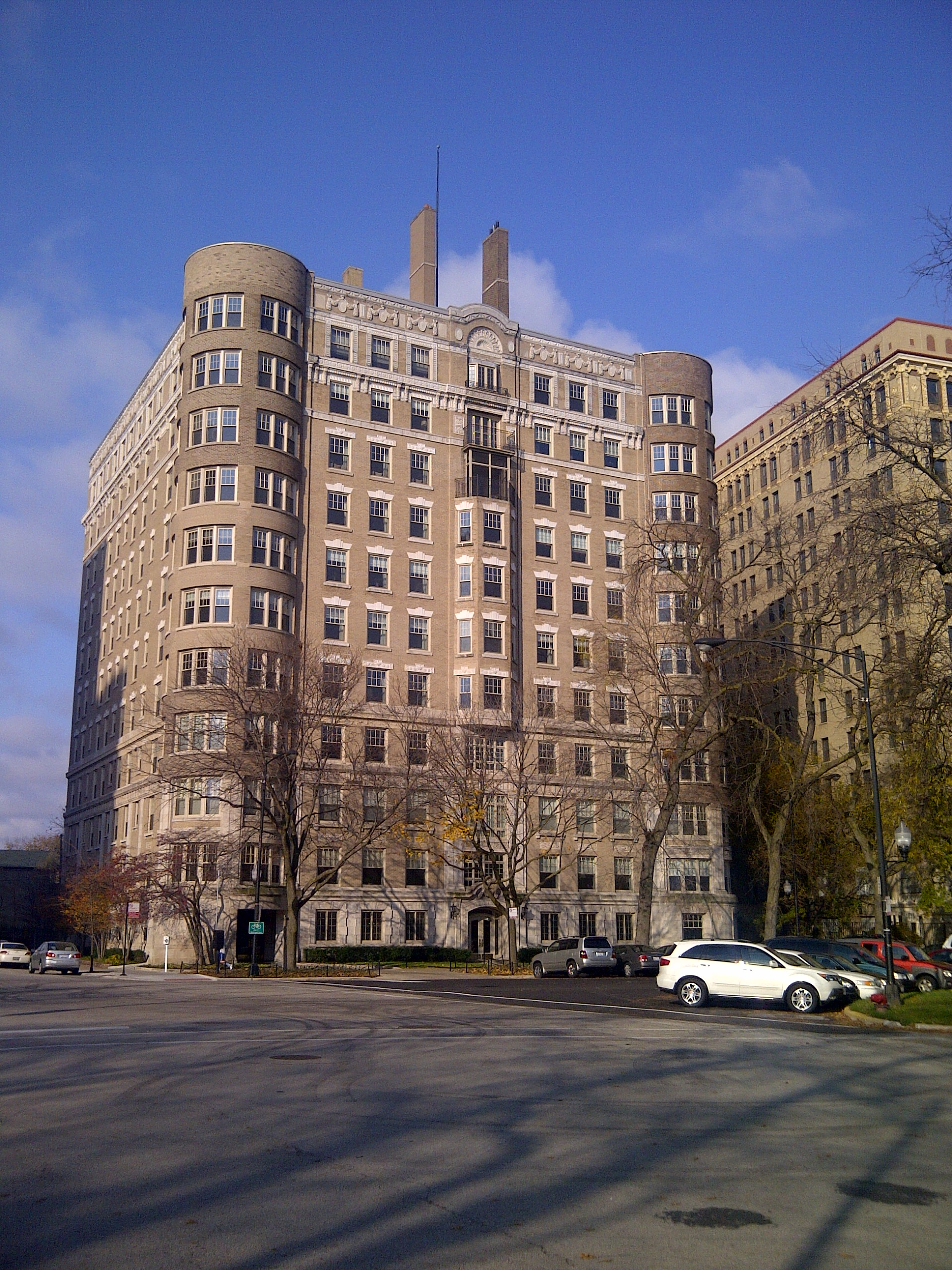

- Location within Chicago metropolitan area Location within Illinois Location within the United States
- Location: 5490 South Shore Dr., Chicago, Illinois
- Coordinates: 41°47′44″N 87°34′51″W
- Area: 0.6 acres (0.24 ha)
- Built: 1916-18
- Architect: Rapp & Rapp
- Architectural style: Classical Revival
- NRHP reference No.: 10000175
- Added to NRHP: April 12, 2010

The Jackson Shore Apartments are a historic apartment building in the Hyde Park neighborhood of Chicago, Illinois. The building was built in 1916–18, at which time Hyde Park was a popular and growing neighborhood. Architects Rapp & Rapp, who were more famous for their work on theaters, designed the Classical Revival building; the style, which conveyed dignity and luxury to apartment-seekers, was a departure from their more elaborate theater designs. The eleven-and-a-half story building's design includes towers at the front corners, detailed stonework on the first floor, a bracketed stringcourse below the top floor, and a frieze above the top floor. The interior continues the classical theming with wood paneling and egg-and-dart molding. While many luxury apartment buildings were built in Hyde Park in the early 20th century, the Jackson Shore Apartments are one of the few well-preserved surviving examples.

The building was added to the National Register of Historic Places on April 12, 2010.
