= Central Park Theater =

- U.S. National Register of Historic Places
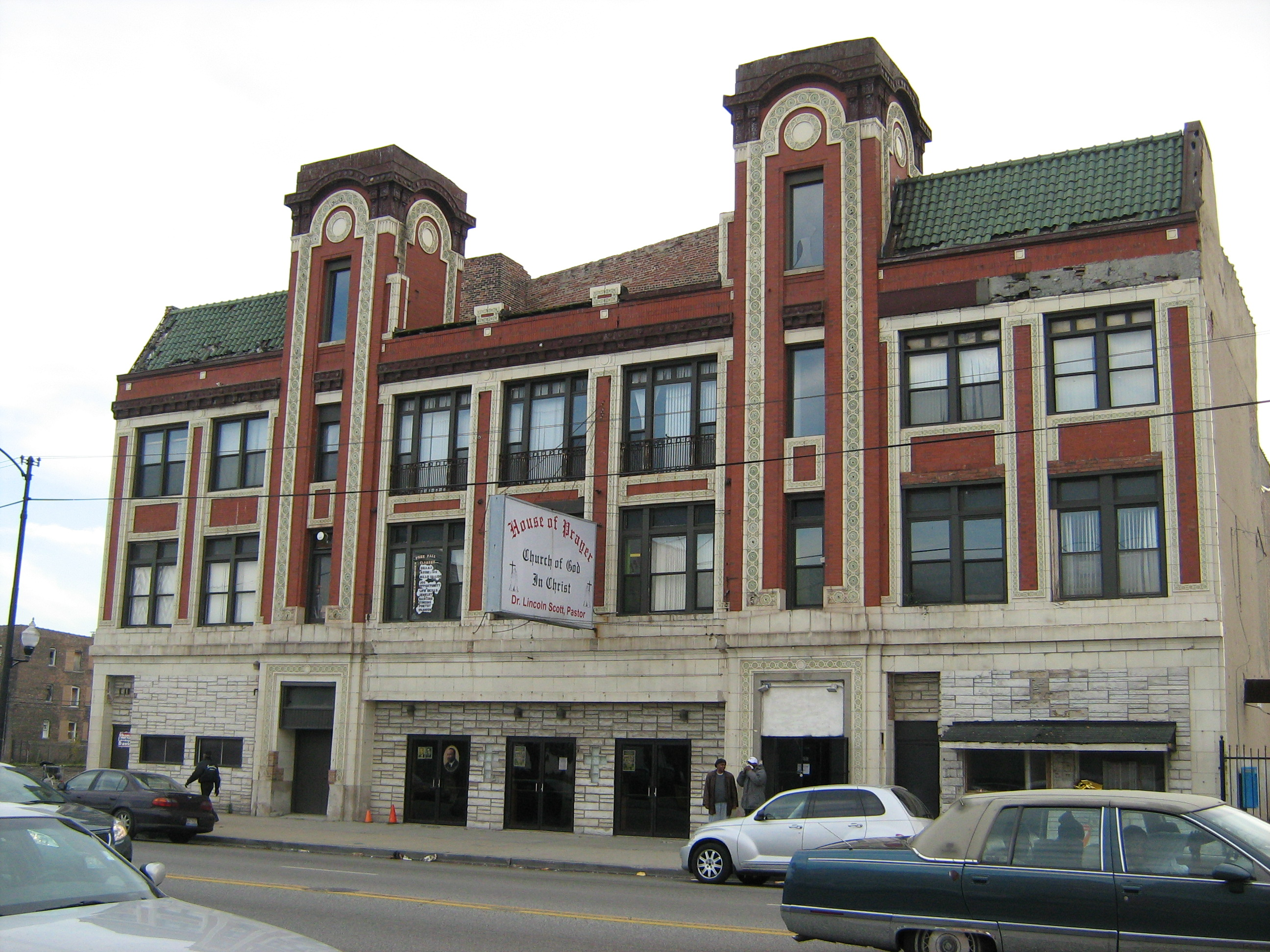
- Location: 3531-39 W. Roosevelt Rd., Chicago, Illinois
- Coordinates: 41°51′59″N 87°42′26″W
- Area: less than one acre
- Built: 1917; 109 years ago
- Architect: Rapp and Rapp
- Architectural style: Spanish Revival
- NRHP reference No.: 05000873
- Added to NRHP: August 10, 2005

Central Park Theater is a historic theater building at 3531-39 W. Roosevelt Road in the Lawndale neighborhood of Chicago, Illinois. Built in 1917, the theater was the first in the Balaban and Katz chain. Chicago architectural firm Rapp and Rapp designed the Spanish Revival building; their design led them to become the main architects for Balaban and Katz, and later for Paramount Pictures. The firm's design featured two prominent towers on its front facade and was decorated with red brick and terra cotta. The theater was also the first in the world to include mechanical air conditioning, which featured prominently in its advertising during the summer. It provided entertainment to both Lawndale's Jewish community and the African-American community that replaced it in the 1950s, and it is one of the few remaining Lawndale business from the early twentieth century. The theatre was the inspiration for the well known Call of Duty Zombies map, Kino Der Toten.

In 1971, the theater was converted to the House of Prayer, Church of God in Christ; it has been used as a church ever since. The theater was added to the National Register of Historic Places on August 10, 2005.
