= Providence Performing Arts Center =

Coordinates: 41°49′17″N 71°24′45″W

- Loew's State Theatre
- U.S. National Register of Historic Places
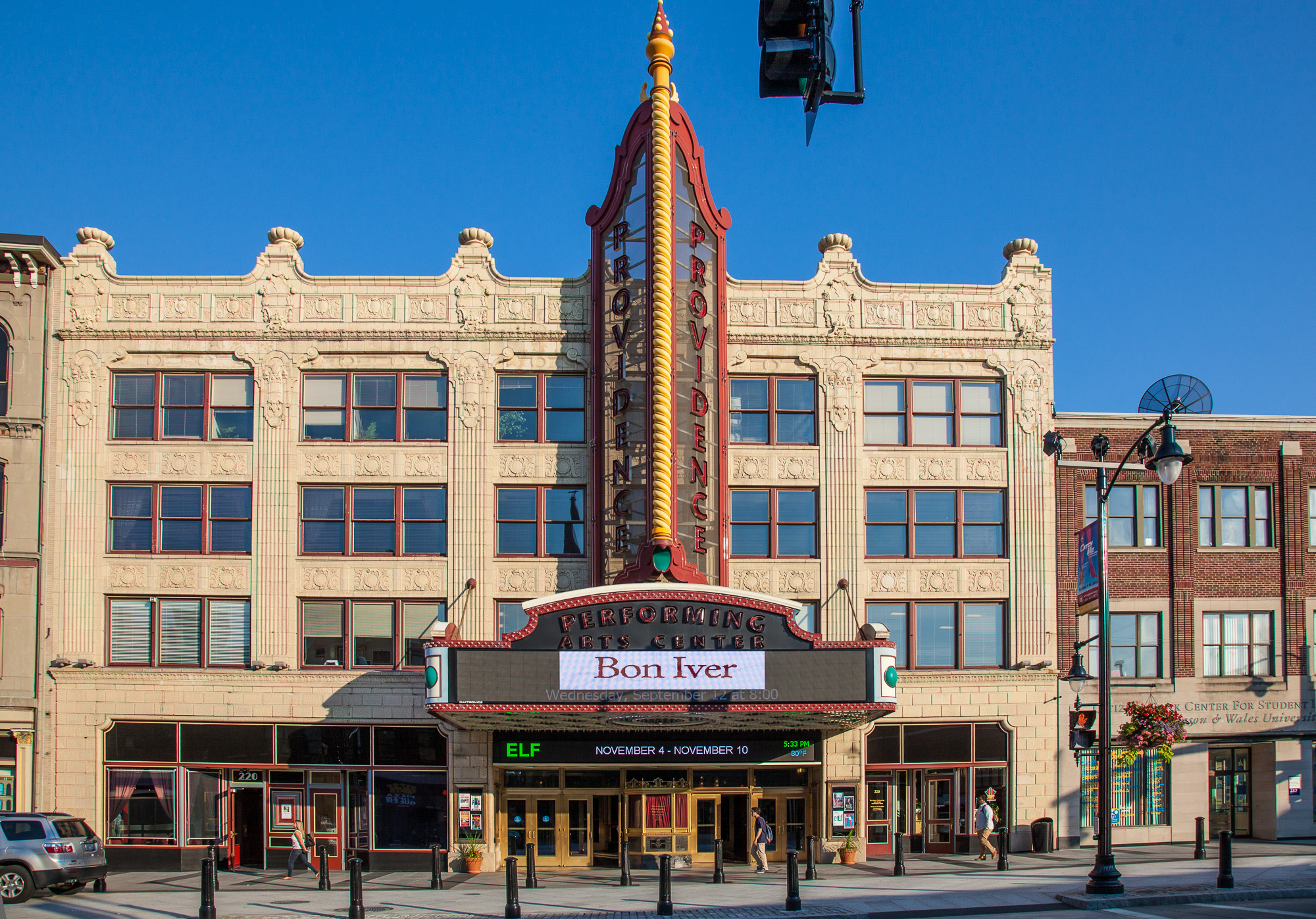
- (2012)

- Location within Rhode Island
- Location: Providence, Rhode Island
- Built: 1928
- Architect: Rapp & Rapp
- NRHP reference No.: 77000027
- Added to NRHP: August 19, 1977

Providence Performing Arts Center
- Interactive map of the Providence Performing Arts Center area

Other information
- Seating capacity: 3,100

The Providence Performing Arts Center (PPAC), formerly Loew's State Theatre and Palace Concert Theater, is a multi-use not-for-profit theater located at 220 Weybosset Street in downtown Providence, Rhode Island. It was built in 1928 as a movie palace by the Loews Theatres chain to designs by Rapp & Rapp, the leading designers of music palaces at the time. PPAC contains 3,100 seats and hosts touring Broadway shows, concerts, plays and films.

The theater was added to the National Register of Historic Places in 1977 under the name "Loew's State Theatre".

== History ==
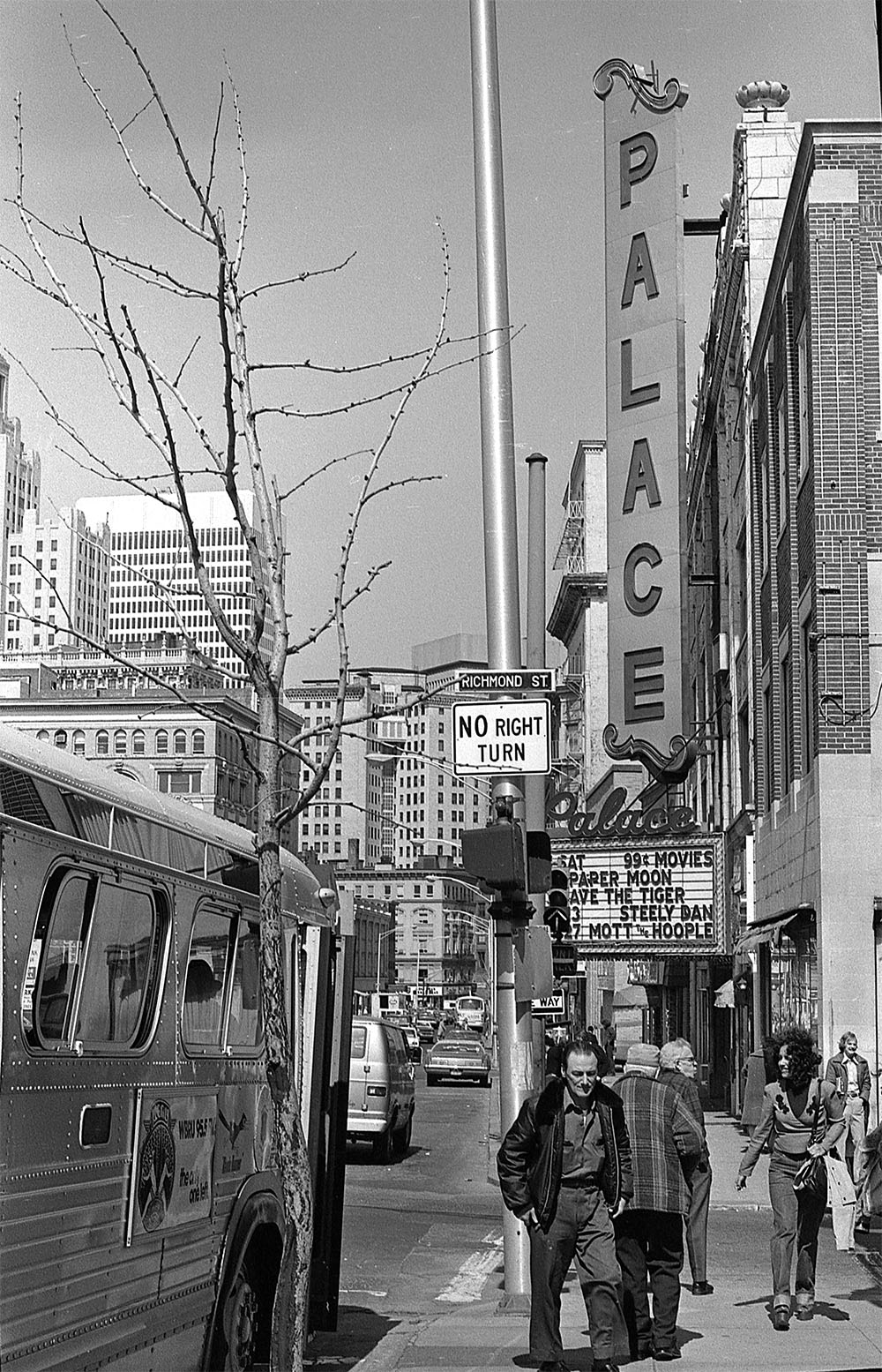
The Palace Theatre, in 1974. The marquee advertises Steely Dan and Mott the Hoople.

The theater was built in 1928 as The Loew's State and was designed by Rapp and Rapp. George and C. W. Rapp were architects who made their name by designing movie palaces across the United States. The first film to be shown at the new theater was Excess Baggage, starring William Haines. Over 14,000 people jammed the building during its opening; they did not come to watch the film, but to see the theater's opulent chandeliers, marble columns, and detailed moldings on the walls.

The theater was the site of a number of notable movie premieres, including the first 3-D feature film, Bwana Devil.

Between 1950 and 1972 the theater operated under the name Loew's Theatre and showed live concerts, rather than movies.

Between 1972 and 1975 the building was known as the Palace Concert Theater, and was used primarily for rock concerts. In 1973-1974 alone, the Palace Concert Theater hosted the Bee Gees, The Kinks, The Doors, Lou Reed, Jackson Browne, Van Morrison, Fleetwood Mac, Queen and Aerosmith. The band King Crimson recorded the song "Providence" during a 1974 concert at the venue; the song was featured on their seventh album Red, released later that year.

The theater was refurbished in 1975, but was almost torn down in 1977. According to mayor Buddy Cianci's account, the theater's owner asked for a permit to demolish the building. Cianci pledged over $1 million of city funds to keep it open. The state of Rhode Island joined in the effort to rescue the theater, as did local businesses and foundations. The venue re-opened in October 1978 From 1978 under the name Ocean State Theatre, a name it held until 1982.

Beginning in 1999, the theater was extensively remodeled and largely restored to its original 1928 opulence. It was also expanded to be able to accommodate touring Broadway productions and orchestra performances. In 1996, PPAC became the anchor of Cianci's Arts and Entertainment District, which offered tax breaks to attract artists to downtown.

== Gallery ==
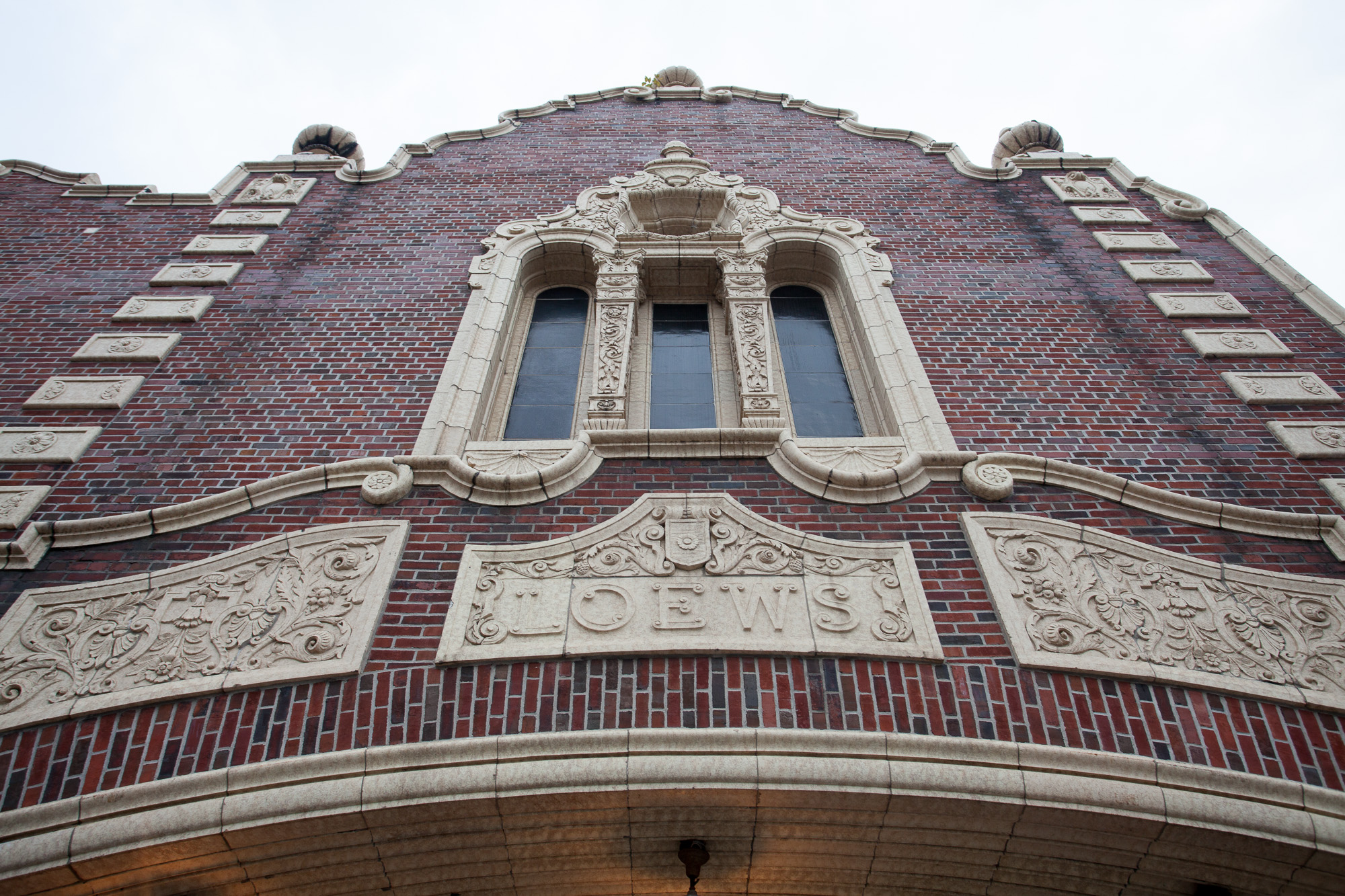
Old Loew's name

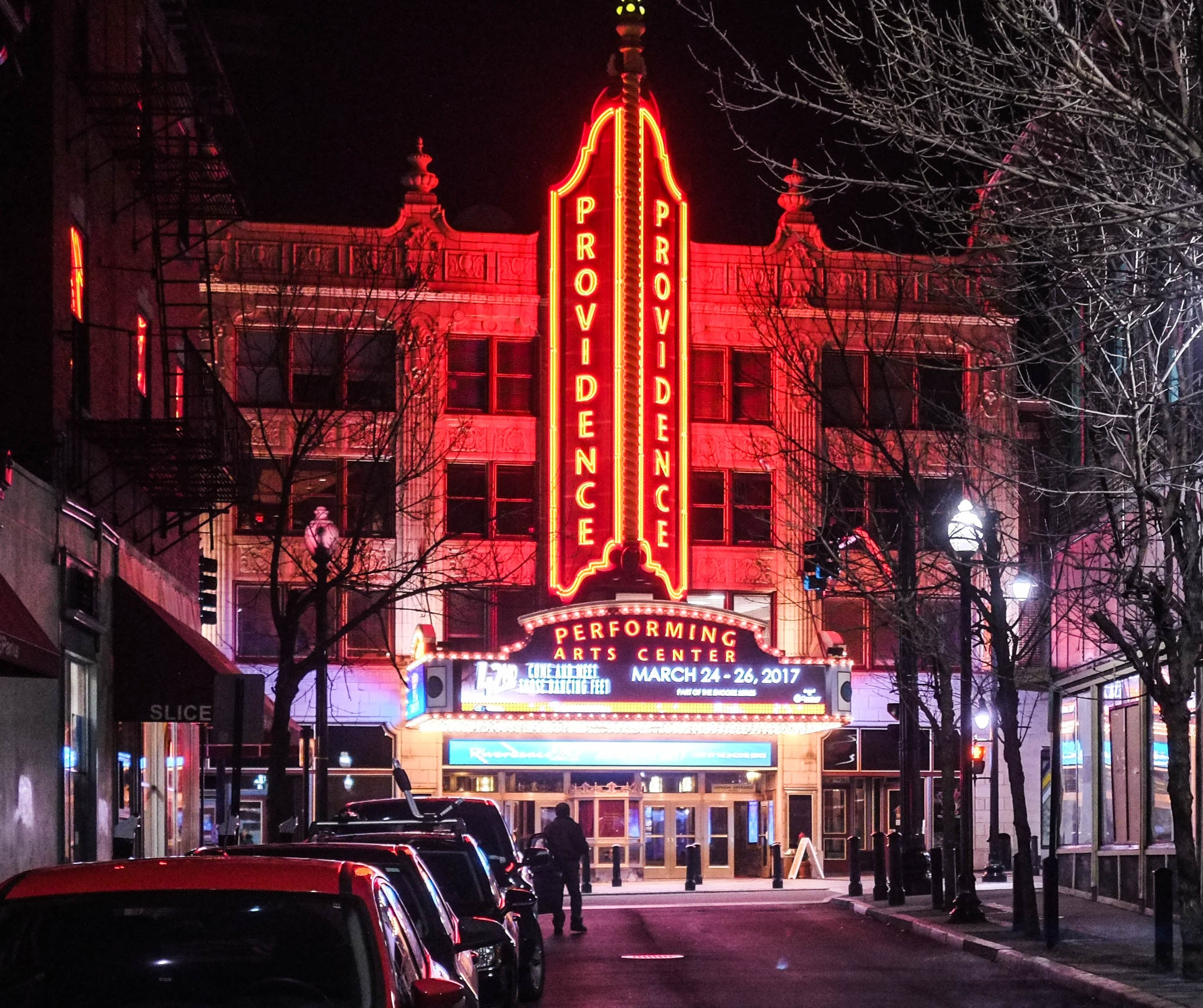
The marquee at night in 2017

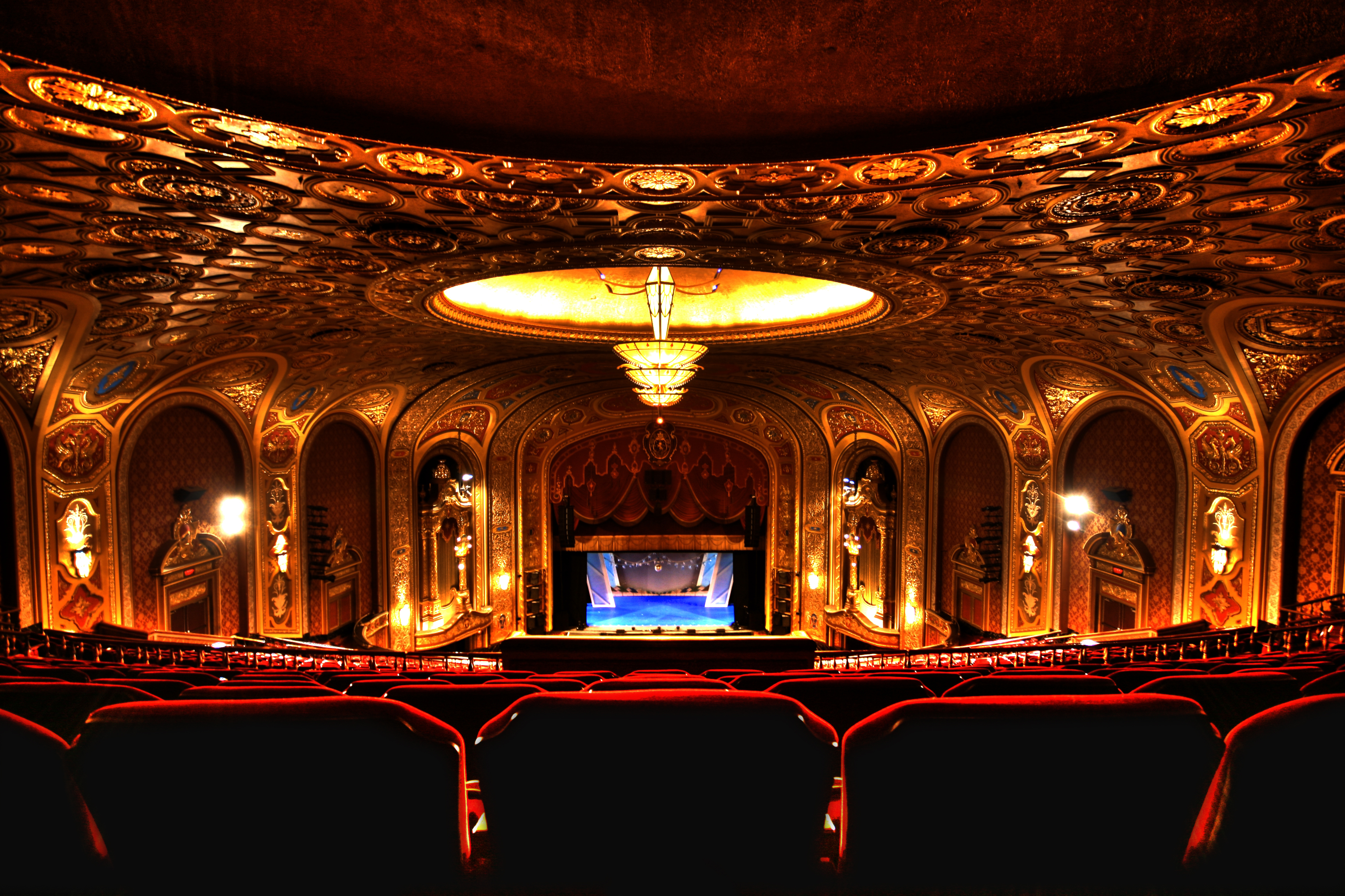
The theater's interior

== See also ==
- National Register of Historic Places listings in Providence, Rhode Island
