= Warner Grand Theater (Milwaukee) =

Theater in Milwaukee Wisconsin

Bradley Symphony Center
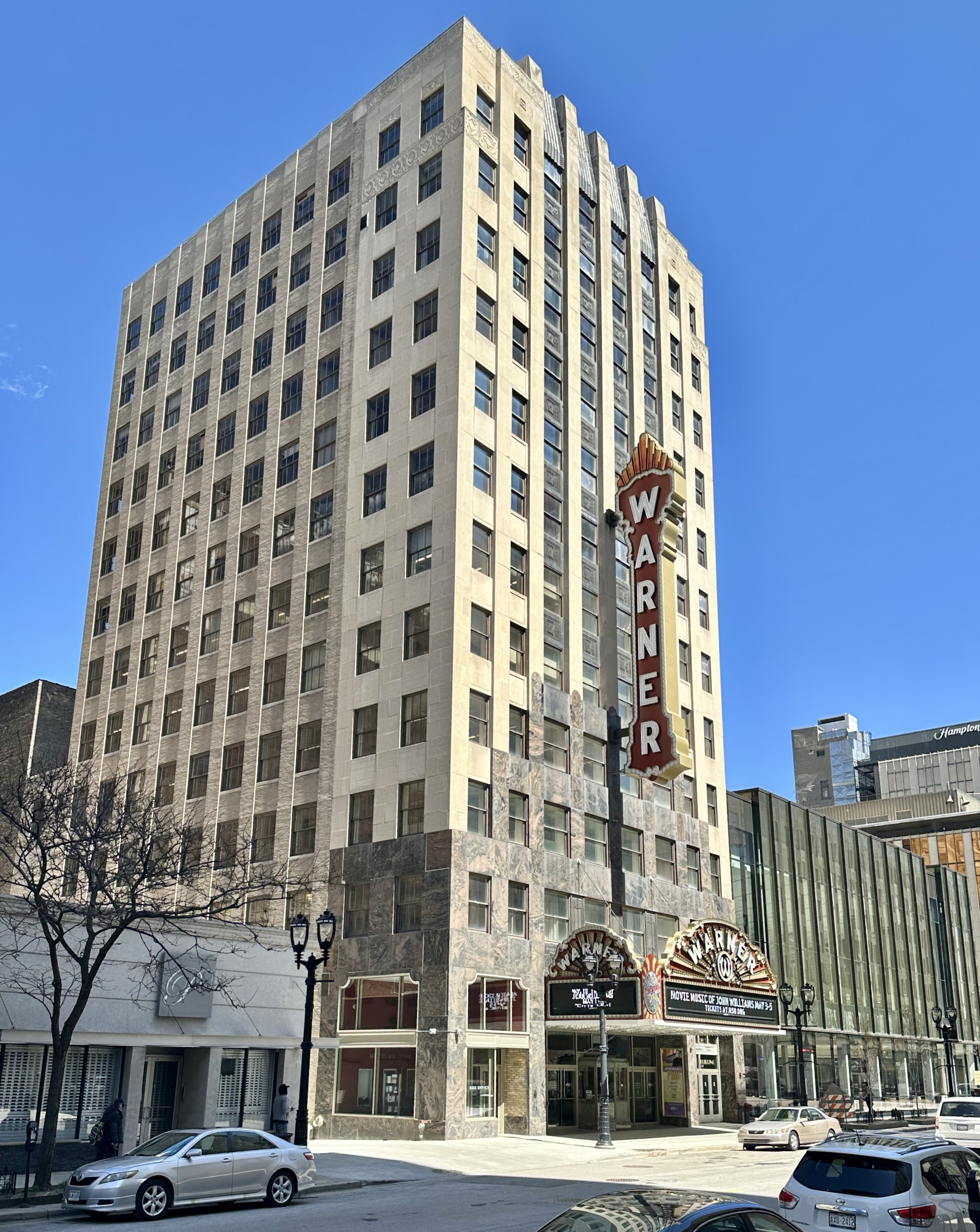
- Bradley Symphony, 2024
- Interactive map of Bradley Symphony Center
- Former names: Warner Theater; Warner Grand Theater
- Address: 212 W. Wisconsin Avenue; Milwaukee, Wisconsin; United States
- Coordinates: 43.039167°N 87.913611°W
- Owner: Milwaukee Symphony Orchestra
- Capacity: 1,799
- Type: Concert hall
- Current use: Performance venue

Construction
- Opened: 1930
- Closed: 1995
- Reopened: 2021
- Years active: 1930-1995, 2021-present
- Architect: Rapp and Rapp

Tenant
- Milwaukee Symphony Orchestra

Website
- MSO

Warner Grand Theater also known as the Bradley Symphony Center, is an Art Deco style theater which was built in Milwaukee, Wisconsin in 1930. The theater was built on the site of the 1,500 seat Butterfly Theater. It is presently the home of the Milwaukee Symphony Orchestra.

== History ==
In December 1929, Warner Brothers negotiated to purchase the Butterfly Theater and other buildings on the site. They planned to build a 10–12-story building with a 2,500 seat capacity. By January 1930 it was confirmed that the Butterfly would be razed to make way for the US3M (equivalent to $57,818,725 in 2025) theater and hotel. In February 1930 workers began demolishing the Butterfly Theater. The theater was demolished in 1930 and the Warner Theatre was built on the site. The architectural firm that designed the building was Rapp and Rapp and the final cost was US$2.5m (equivalent to $52,926,696 in 2025). It opened in 1931 and the grand opening was attended by thousands of people. The theater struggled during the Great Depression in the United States.

In 1964 the building was purchased by the Marcus Corporation and renamed "Centre". In 1982 the building was renamed "The Grand" to match the shopping mall across the street: Grand Avenue Mall. The building closed in 1995 and the theater remained empty.

In December 2017, the Milwaukee Symphony Orchestra purchased the former Warner Grand Theatre. An anonymous donor led the initiative to buy the vacant theater. In 2021, after years of extensive restoration, renovation, and repurposing, the addition of a new atrium/event space, and a year’s delay due to COVID-19, the orchestra officially moved into the building, renaming it the Bradley Symphony Center.

== Description ==
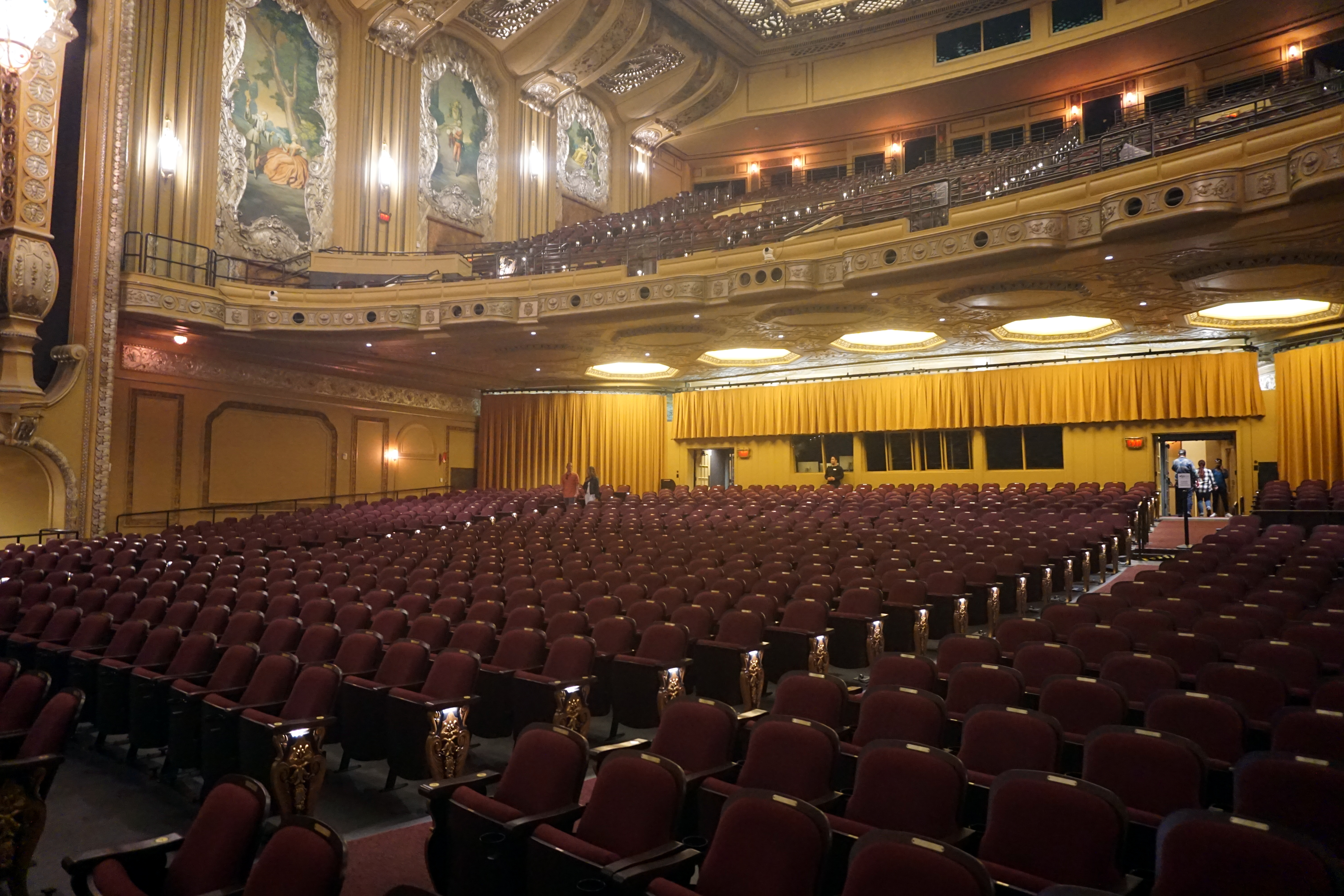
Warner Grand Theater seating

The building has an Art Deco style theater. The theater had a single screen and the interior was described as French Renaissance style. The lobby was described as art-deco style and the exterior was described as Moderne. When the theater was operating it had a 28-rank Kimball pipe organ.

There is a 13-story office building which is part of the theater and its exterior is designed in the Art Deco style and the facade features polished granite on floors one through four.
