= National Register of Historic Places listings in South Side Chicago =

There are 106 sites on the National Register of Historic Places listings in South Side Chicago — of more than 350 total listings within the City of Chicago, in Cook County, Illinois.

The South Side district is defined for this article as the area west of Lake Michigan, and south of 26th Street and the Chicago Sanitary and Ship Canal, to the southern Chicago city limits.

	NRHP-listed
^{∞}	NRHP-listed Historic district
*	National Historic Landmark and NRHP-listed
^{∞}	National Historic Landmark and NRHP-listed Historic district

This National Park Service list is complete through NPS recent listings posted October 16, 2026.

== South Side Chicago listings on the National Register ==
The listed properties are distributed across 19 of the 77 well-defined community areas of Chicago.

	Name on the Register	Image	Date listed	Location	Neighborhood	Description
1	Robert S. Abbott House	Robert S. Abbott House	December 8, 1976 (#76000686)	4742 S. Dr. Martin Luther King Jr. Drive; 41°48′36″N 87°36′58″W	Grand Boulevard	Home of Robert S. Abbott, founder of the Chicago Defender newspaper
2	Altgeld Gardens–Philip Murray Homes Historic District	Altgeld Gardens–Philip Murray Homes Historic District	April 13, 2022 (#100007590)	E. 130th, East 133rd, and East 134th Streets, E. 130th and East 133rd Places, S. Greenwood & St. Lawrence Avenues; 41°39′17″N 87°35′57″W	Riverdale	
3	Armour Square	Armour Square	August 19, 2003 (#03000789)	Bounded by W. 33rd Street, W. 34th Place, S. Wells Street and S. Shields Avenue; 41°50′01″N 87°38′02″W	Armour Square	
4	Auburn Gresham Bungalow Historic District	Auburn Gresham Bungalow Historic District	October 9, 2012 (#12000841)	Roughly bounded by S. Paulina Street, W. 78th Street, W. 75th Street, & S. Winchester Avenue; 41°45′17″N 87°40′08″W	Auburn Gresham	Part of the Chicago Bungalows Multiple Property Submission (MPS)
5	Avalon Park Bungalow Historic District		August 23, 2023 (#100009251)	Roughly bounded by: East 79th St., S. Harper Avenue, East 83rd St., and S. Woodlawn Avenue; 41°44′52″N 87°35′30″W	Avalon Park	
6	AVR 661		November 19, 1980 (#80001342)	Calumet Harbor; 41°39′43″N 87°34′30″W	South Deering	
7	Belmonte Flats	Belmonte Flats	February 5, 1998 (#98000063)	4257-4259 S. Dr. Martin Luther King Jr. Drive, and 400-412 E. 43rd Street; 41°49′01″N 87°36′59″W	Grand Boulevard	
8	James H. Bowen High School	James H. Bowen High School	September 17, 2026 (#100013403)	2710 E. 89th Street; 41°44′01″N 87°33′27″W	South Chicago	
8	Brainerd Bungalow Historic District	Brainerd Bungalow Historic District	December 27, 2016 (#16000895)	Roughly bounded by W. 89th Street, S. May Street, W. 95th Street & S. Loomis Street; 41°43′37″N 87°39′20″W	Washington Heights	
9	Calumet Park	Calumet Park	August 21, 2003 (#03000788)	9801 S. Avenue G 41°43′00″N 87°31′41″W	East Side	
10	Central Manufacturing District-Original East Historic District	Central Manufacturing District-Original East Historic District	February 15, 2016 (#16000004)	3600 block of S. Morgan Street, S. Racine Avenue & S. Iron Street, 3700 block of S. Ashland Avenue, 1400 block W. 38th Street; 41°49′45″N 87°39′24″W	Bridgeport and McKinley Park	
11	Central Manufacturing District–Pershing Road Development Historic District	Central Manufacturing District–Pershing Road Development Historic District	August 18, 2015 (#15000522)	South Side of the 2000 Block of W. Pershing Road; 41°49′20″N 87°40′30″W	New City	
12	Chicago Beach Hotel	Chicago Beach Hotel	May 14, 1986 (#86001193)	5100-5110 S. Cornell Avenue; 41°48′08″N 87°35′13″W	Hyde Park	
13	Chicago Bee Building	Chicago Bee Building	April 30, 1986 (#86001090)	3651 S. State Street; 41°49′41″N 87°37′34″W	Douglas	
14	Chicago Park Boulevard System Historic District	Chicago Park Boulevard System Historic District	December 18, 2018 (#12000040)	Douglass Park, Gage, McKinley Park, Jackson Park, Sherman Park, Washington Park, Garfield Park & Humboldt Parks, E. Oakwood, S. Drexel Boulevards		
15	Chicago Vocational School		August 15, 2022 (#100007996)	2100 E. 87th Street; 41°44′14″N 87°34′32″W	Avalon Park	
16	Chrysler Village	Chrysler Village	May 27, 2014 (#14000254)	Bounded by S. Long Avenue and S. Lavergne Avenue, W. 63rd Street and W. 65th Street; 41°46′34″N 87°45′05″W	Clearing	
17	Arthur H. Compton House	Arthur H. Compton House	May 11, 1976 (#76000687)	5637 S. Woodlawn Avenue; 41°47′31″N 87°35′47″W	Hyde Park	
18	Cornell Square	Cornell Square	August 11, 2005 (#05000875)	1809 W. 50th Street; 41°48′08″N 87°40′16″W	New City	
19	Davis Square	Davis Square	August 18, 2003 (#03000787)	Roughly bounded by W. 44th Street, W, 45th Street, S. Marshfield Avenue and S. Hemitage Avenue; 41°48′47″N 87°40′03″W	New City	
20	Oscar Stanton De Priest House	Oscar Stanton De Priest House	May 15, 1975 (#75000646)	4536-4538 S. Dr. Martin Luther King, Jr. Drive; 41°48′42″N 87°37′05″W	Grand Boulevard	
21	Douglas Tomb State Memorial	Douglas Tomb State Memorial	May 28, 1976 (#76000689)	636 E. 35th Street; 41°49′54″N 87°36′30″W	Douglas	
22	Charles Warrington Earle School	Charles Warrington Earle School	March 15, 2021 (#100006227)	6121 S. Hermitage Avenue; 41°46′57″N 87°40′03″W	West Englewood	
23	East Park Towers	East Park Towers	May 14, 1986 (#86001197)	5242 S. Hyde Park Boulevard; 41°47′59″N 87°35′04″W	Hyde Park	
24	Ebenezer Missionary Baptist Church	Ebenezer Missionary Baptist Church	October 24, 2016 (#16000734)	4501 S. Vincennes Avenue; 41°48′46″N 87°36′50″W	Grand Boulevard	
25	Eighth Regiment Armory	Eighth Regiment Armory	April 30, 1986 (#86001096)	3533 S. Giles Avenue; 41°49′50″N 87°37′10″W	Douglas	
26	Site of First Self-Sustaining Nuclear Reaction	Site of First Self-Sustaining Nuclear Reaction	October 15, 1966 (#66000314)	S. Ellis Avenue between E. 56th & 57th Streets; 41°47′33″N 87°36′04″W	Hyde Park	
27	Flamingo-on-the-Lake Apartments	Flamingo-on-the-Lake Apartments	May 14, 1986 (#86001194)	5510 S. Shore Drive; 41°47′41″N 87°34′51″W	Hyde Park	
28	The Forum	The Forum	April 16, 2019 (#100003646)	318-328 E. 43rd Street; 41°49′00″N 87°37′07″W	Grand Boulevard	
29	Four Nineteen Building	Four Nineteen Building	August 12, 1999 (#99000973)	419 E. 83rd Street; 41°44′37″N 87°36′50″W	Chatham	
30	Fuller Park	Fuller Park	November 20, 2002 (#02001347)	331 W. 45th Street; 41°48′46″N 87°38′03″W	Fuller Park	
31	Gage Park Bungalow Historic District		March 13, 2020 (#100004852)	Roughly bounded by W. 55th Street, S. Washtenaw Avenue, W. 59th Street & S. Sacramento Avenue; 41°47′24″N 87°41′42″W	Gage Park	
32	Garden Homes Historic District	Garden Homes Historic District	February 28, 2005 (#05000108)	Roughly bounded by S. Wabash Avenue, E. 88th Street, and Indiana Avenue; 41°44′11″N 87°37′18″W	Chatham	
33	Goldblatt Bros. Department Store	Goldblatt Bros. Department Store	November 15, 2006 (#06001016)	4700 S. Ashland Avenue; 41°48′30″N 87°39′55″W	New City	
34	Grand Crossing Park	Grand Crossing Park	August 8, 2006 (#06000678)	7655 S. Ingleside Avenue; 41°45′25″N 87°36′01″W	Greater Grand Crossing	
35	John W. Griffiths Mansion	John W. Griffiths Mansion	March 5, 1982 (#82002528)	3806 S. Michigan Avenue; 41°49′32″N 87°37′26″W	Douglas	Also designated a Chicago Landmark under the name Griffiths-Burroughs House
36	Hamilton Park	Hamilton Park	April 20, 1995 (#95000487)	513 W. 72nd Street; 41°45′42″N 87°38′14″W	Englewood	
37	Anton E. Hanson House	Anton E. Hanson House	February 9, 2006 (#06000008)	7610 S. Ridgeland Avenue; 41°45′24″N 87°34′57″W	South Shore	The Cook County Assessor shows the address as 7608 S. Cleveland
38	Isadore H. Heller House	Isadore H. Heller House	March 16, 1972 (#72000450)	5132 S. Woodlawn Avenue; 41°48′05″N 87°35′35″W	Hyde Park	
39	Charles Hitchcock Hall	Charles Hitchcock Hall	December 30, 1974 (#74000751)	1009 E. 57th Street; 41°47′28″N 87°36′03″W	Hyde Park	
40	Hotel Del Prado	Hotel Del Prado	May 14, 1986 (#86001195)	5307 S. Hyde Park Boulevard; 41°47′58″N 87°35′02″W	Hyde Park	
41	Hotel Windermere East	Hotel Windermere East	October 19, 1982 (#82000391)	1642 E. 56th Street; 41°47′35″N 87°35′00″W	Hyde Park	
42	Hyde Park-Kenwood Historic District	Hyde Park-Kenwood Historic District	February 14, 1979 (#79000824)	Roughly bounded by E. 47th Street and E. 59th Street, S. Cottage Grove Avenue and S. Lake Park Avenue; also 825 and 816-826 E. 49th Street; also 829 and 843 E. 52nd Street; 41°47′53″N 87°35′51″W	Hyde Park and Kenwood	Second and third sets of boundaries represent boundary increases of August 16, 1984 and May 16, 1986 respectively
43	Illinois Institute of Technology Academic Campus	Illinois Institute of Technology Academic Campus	August 12, 2005 (#05000871)	Roughly bounded by State Street, 33rd Street, and the Dan Ryan Expressway; 41°50′06″N 87°37′42″W	Douglas	
44	Jackson Park Historic Landscape District and Midway Plaisance	Jackson Park Historic Landscape District and Midway Plaisance	December 15, 1972 (#72001565)	Jackson and Washington Parks and Midway Plaisance roadway 41°46′48″N 87°34′38″W	Hyde Park, Washington Park and Woodlawn	
45	Jackson Shore Apartments	Jackson Shore Apartments	April 12, 2010 (#10000175)	5490 S. Shore Drive; 41°47′44″N 87°34′51″W	Hyde Park	
46	Jeffery–Cyril Historic District	Jeffery–Cyril Historic District	May 5, 1986 (#86001007)	7128-7138 & 7146-7148 S. Cyril Avenue; 7130, 7146, and 7147 S. Jeffery Boulevard; and 1970 E. 71st Place; 41°45′53″N 87°34′36″W	South Shore	
47	Kehilath Anshe Ma'ariv Synagogue	Kehilath Anshe Ma'ariv Synagogue	April 26, 1973 (#73000696)	3301 S. Indiana Avenue; 41°50′04″N 87°37′17″W	Douglas	
48	Sydney Kent House	Sydney Kent House	November 17, 1977 (#77000477)	2944 S. Michigan Avenue; 41°50′26″N 87°37′27″W	Douglas	
49	Kenwood Evangelical Church	Kenwood Evangelical Church	May 16, 1991 (#91000570)	4604 S. Greenwood Avenue; 41°48′41″N 87°36′00″W	Kenwood	
50	Lake-Side Terrace Apartments	Lake-Side Terrace Apartments	November 13, 1984 (#84000289)	7425-7427 S. South Shore Drive; 41°45′44″N 87°33′25″W	South Shore	
51	Frank R. Lillie House	Frank R. Lillie House	May 11, 1976 (#76000696)	5801 S. Kenwood Avenue; 41°47′22″N 87°35′34″W	Hyde Park	
52	Mayfair Apartments	Mayfair Apartments	May 14, 1986 (#86001198)	1658 E. 56th Street; 41°47′43″N 87°35′03″W	Hyde Park	
53	Allan Miller House	Allan Miller House	August 23, 1991 (#91001082)	7121 S. Paxton Avenue; 41°45′57″N 87°34′16″W	South Shore	
54	Robert A. Millikan House	Robert A. Millikan House	May 11, 1976 (#76000699)	5605 S. Woodlawn Avenue; 41°47′34″N 87°35′47″W	Hyde Park	
55	The Honorable Elijah Muhammad House	The Honorable Elijah Muhammad House	March 22, 2022 (#100007536)	4847 S. Woodlawn Avenue; 41°48′23″N 87°35′48″W	Kenwood	
56	The Narragansett	The Narragansett	April 18, 2005 (#05000107)	1640 E. 50th Street; 41°48′16″N 87°35′05″W	Kenwood	
57	Old Stone Gate of Chicago Union Stockyards	Old Stone Gate of Chicago Union Stockyards	December 27, 1972 (#72000451)	W. Exchange Avenue & S. Peoria Street; 41°49′07″N 87°38′54″W	New City	
58	On Leong Merchants Association Building	On Leong Merchants Association Building	September 2, 2025 (#100012168)	2216 South Wentworth Avenue; 41°51′09″N 87°37′56″W	Armour Square	Now known as the Pui Tak Center
59	Our Lady of the Holy Rosary Church/Holy Rosary Church	Our Lady of the Holy Rosary Church/Holy Rosary Church	April 15, 2024 (#100010217)	11300 S. Dr. Martin Luther King Jr., Drive; 41°41′20″N 87°36′48″W	Roseland	
60	Overton Hygienic Building	Overton Hygienic Building	April 30, 1986 (#86001091)	3623 S. State Street; 41°49′41″N 87°37′34″W	Douglas	
61	Anthony Overton Elementary School	Anthony Overton Elementary School	September 6, 2016 (#16000578)	221 E. 49th Street; 41°48′20″N 87°37′14″W	Grand Boulevard	
62	Palmer Park	Palmer Park	August 30, 2007 (#07000855)	201 E. 111th Street; 41°41′33″N 87°37′06″W	Roseland	
63	Parkway Garden Homes	Parkway Garden Homes	November 22, 2011 (#11000848)	6338 S. Dr. Martin Luther King Jr Drive; 41°46′36″N 87°36′59″W	Greater Grand Crossing	
64	James E. Plew Building		August 15, 2022 (#100007999)	2635-2645 S. Wabash Avenue; 41°50′40″N 87°37′31″W	Douglas	
65	Poinsettia Apartments	Poinsettia Apartments	May 14, 1986 (#86001199)	5528 S. Hyde Park Boulevard; 41°47′39″N 87°35′03″W	Hyde Park	
66	Promontory Apartments	Promontory Apartments	November 21, 1996 (#96001281)	5530-5532 S. Shore Drive; 41°47′39″N 87°34′51″W	Hyde Park	
67	Promontory Point	Promontory Point	January 18, 2018 (#100001970)	5491 S. Shore Drive; 41°47′46″N 87°34′34″W	Hyde Park	
68	Pullman Historic District	Pullman Historic District	October 8, 1969 (#69000054)	Bounded by E. 103rd Street, C.S.S. and S.B. Railroad spur tracks, E. 115th Street and Cottage Grove Avenue; 41°41′50″N 87°36′34″W	Pullman	
69	Ramova Theater	Ramova Theater	December 17, 2021 (#100007223)	3508-3518 S. Halsted Street; 41°49′48″N 87°38′46″W	Bridgeport	
70	Ridge Historic District	Ridge Historic District	May 28, 1976 (#76000703)	Roughly bounded by RR tracks, W. 87th Street, S. Prospect Avenue, S. Homewood Avenue, W. 115th Street, S. Lothair Avenue, S. Hamilton Avenue, and S. Western Avenue; 41°42′36″N 87°40′13″W	Beverly and Morgan Park	
71	Frederick C. Robie House	Frederick C. Robie House	October 15, 1966 (#66000316)	5757 S. Woodlawn Avenue; 41°47′23″N 87°35′45″W	Hyde Park	
72	Martin Roche-John Tait House	Martin Roche-John Tait House	November 8, 2000 (#00001338)	3614 S. Dr. Martin Luther King Jr. Drive; 41°49′46″N 87°37′04″W	Douglas	
73	Robert Roloson Houses	Robert Roloson Houses	June 30, 1977 (#77000479)	3213-3219 S. Calumet Avenue; 41°50′08″N 87°37′04″W	Douglas	
74	Room 405, George Herbert Jones Laboratory, The University of Chicago	Room 405, George Herbert Jones Laboratory, The University of Chicago	May 28, 1967 (#67000005)	5747 S. Ellis Avenue; 41°47′25″N 87°36′04″W	Hyde Park	Site of the discovery of Plutonium
75	Rosenwald Apartment Building	Rosenwald Apartment Building	August 13, 1981 (#81000218)	4632 S. Michigan Avenue; 41°48′37″N 87°37′26″W	Grand Boulevard	
76	S.R. Crown Hall	S.R. Crown Hall	August 7, 2001 (#01001049)	3360 S. State Street; 41°50′01″N 87°37′36″W	Douglas	
77	St. Thomas Church and Convent	St. Thomas Church and Convent	December 18, 1978 (#78001132)	5472 S. Kimbark Avenue; 41°47′44″N 87°35′43″W	Hyde Park	
78	Schlitz Brewery-Tied House	Schlitz Brewery-Tied House	December 20, 2022 (#100008489)	9401 S. Ewing Avenue; 41°43′29″N 87°32′17″W	East Side	
79	Schulze Baking Company Plant	Schulze Baking Company Plant	November 12, 1982 (#82000393)	40 E. Garfield Boulevard; 41°47′44″N 87°37′29″W	Washington Park	
80	Sherman Park	Sherman Park	May 21, 1990 (#90000745)	Bounded by W. 52nd Street, S. Racine Avenue, W. Garfield Boulevard, and S. Loomis Street; 41°47′48″N 87°39′18″W	New City	
81	Shoreland Hotel	Shoreland Hotel	May 14, 1986 (#86001201)	5450-5484 S. Shore Drive; 41°47′45″N 87°34′52″W	Hyde Park	
82	Shoreline Apartments	Shoreline Apartments	September 5, 2017 (#100001563)	2231 E. 67th Street; 41°46′24″N 87°34′13″W	South Shore	
83	South Park Manor Historic District	South Park Manor Historic District	February 25, 2004 (#04000076)	Roughly bounded by S. Dr. Martin Luther King Jr. Drive, S. State Street, and E. 77th Street; 41°45′25″N 87°37′09″W	Greater Grand Crossing	
84	South Shore Beach Apartments	South Shore Beach Apartments	June 9, 1978 (#78001131)	7321 S. South Shore Drive; 41°45′50″N 87°33′34″W	South Shore	
85	South Shore Bungalow Historic District	South Shore Bungalow Historic District	December 10, 2008 (#08001168)	Bounded roughly by S. Crandon Avenue on the East, E. 78th Street on the South, S. Clyde Avenue on the West, and E. 75th Street on the North; 41°45′13″N 87°34′07″W	South Shore	
86	South Shore Country Club	South Shore Country Club	March 4, 1975 (#75000652)	7059 S. South Shore Drive; 41°46′11″N 87°33′46″W	South Shore	
87	South Side Community Art Center	South Side Community Art Center	September 13, 2018 (#100002914)	3831 S. Michigan Avenue; 41°49′29″N 87°37′23″W	Douglas	
88	Spiegel Office Building	Spiegel Office Building	February 18, 2009 (#09000025)	1038 W. 35th Street; 41°49′50″N 87°39′09″W	Bridgeport	
89	Stony Island Trust and Savings Bank Building	Stony Island Trust and Savings Bank Building	December 31, 2013 (#13001002)	6760 S. Stony Island Avenue; 41°46′18″N 87°35′12″W	South Shore	
90	Strand Hotel	Strand Hotel	January 29, 2013 (#12001237)	6319 S. Cottage Grove Avenue; 41°46′47″N 87°36′21″W	Woodlawn	
91	Sutherland Hotel	Sutherland Hotel	May 4, 2011 (#11000243)	4659 S. Drexel Boulevard; 41°48′35″N 87°36′12″W	Kenwood	
92	Swift House	Swift House	June 9, 1978 (#78001133)	4500 S. Michigan Avenue; 41°48′47″N 87°37′24″W	Grand Boulevard	
93	Lorado Taft Midway Studios	Lorado Taft Midway Studios	October 15, 1966 (#66000317)	6016 S. Ingleside Avenue; 41°47′08″N 87°36′13″W	Woodlawn	
94	Trumbull Park	Trumbull Park	April 20, 1995 (#95000486)	2400 E. 105th Street; 41°42′23″N 87°33′52″W	South Deering	
95	U-505 (IX C U-Boat)	U-505 (IX C U-Boat)	June 29, 1989 (#89001231)	Museum of Science & Industry; 41°47′31″N 87°34′55″W	Hyde Park	
96	Unity Hall	Unity Hall	April 30, 1986 (#86001092)	3140 S. Indiana Avenue; 41°50′16″N 87°37′21″W	Douglas	
97	University Apartments	University Apartments	December 22, 2005 (#04001301)	1401 and 1451 E. 55th Street; 1400 and 1450 E. 55th Place; 41°47′50″N 87°35′27″W	Hyde Park	
98	Victory Sculpture	Victory Sculpture	April 30, 1986 (#86001089)	E. 35th Street at S. Dr. Martin Luther King Jr. Drive; 41°49′52″N 87°37′03″W	Douglas	
99	Wabash Avenue YMCA	Wabash Avenue YMCA	April 30, 1986 (#86001095)	3763 S. Wabash Avenue; 41°49′33″N 87°37′29″W	Douglas	
100	Washington Park	Washington Park	August 20, 2004 (#04000871)	5531 S. Dr. Martin Luther King Jr. Drive; 41°47′45″N 87°36′40″W	Washington Park	
101	Muddy Waters House	Muddy Waters House	December 23, 2022 (#100008485)	4339 S. Lake Park Avenue; 41°48′57″N 87°35′53″W	Kenwood	
102	Ida B. Wells-Barnett House	Ida B. Wells-Barnett House	May 30, 1974 (#74000757)	3624 S. Dr. Martin Luther King Jr. Drive; 41°49′47″N 87°37′03″W	Douglas	
103	West Chatham Bungalow Historic District	West Chatham Bungalow Historic District	April 19, 2010 (#10000176)	Bounded roughly by S. Perry Avenue on the East, E. 82nd Street on the South, S. Stewart Avenue on the West, and W. 79th Street on the North; 41°44′53″N 87°37′50″W	Chatham	
104	West Pullman Elementary School	West Pullman Elementary School	August 27, 2018 (#100002822)	11941 S. Parnell Avenue; 41°40′37″N 87°38′09″W	West Pullman	
105	Dr. Daniel Hale Williams House	Dr. Daniel Hale Williams House	May 15, 1975 (#75000655)	445 E. 42nd Street; 41°49′07″N 87°36′55″W	Grand Boulevard	
106	The Yale	The Yale	March 5, 1998 (#98000178)	6565 S. Yale Avenue; 41°46′28″N 87°37′53″W	Englewood	

== Former building ==
	Name on the Register	Image	Date listed	Date removed	Location	Description
1	Jordan Building		April 30, 1986 (#86001097)	September 5, 1986	3539 S. State St.	Demolished

== See also ==
- List of Chicago Landmarks
- National Register of Historic Places in Chicago
  - National Register of Historic Places listings in Central Chicago
  - National Register of Historic Places listings in North Side Chicago
  - National Register of Historic Places listings in West Side Chicago
- List of Registered Historic Places in Illinois
- List of National Historic Landmarks in Illinois
