= Ida B. Wells-Barnett House =

Historic house in Chicago, Illinois

- U.S. National Register of Historic Places
- U.S. National Historic Landmark
- Chicago Landmark
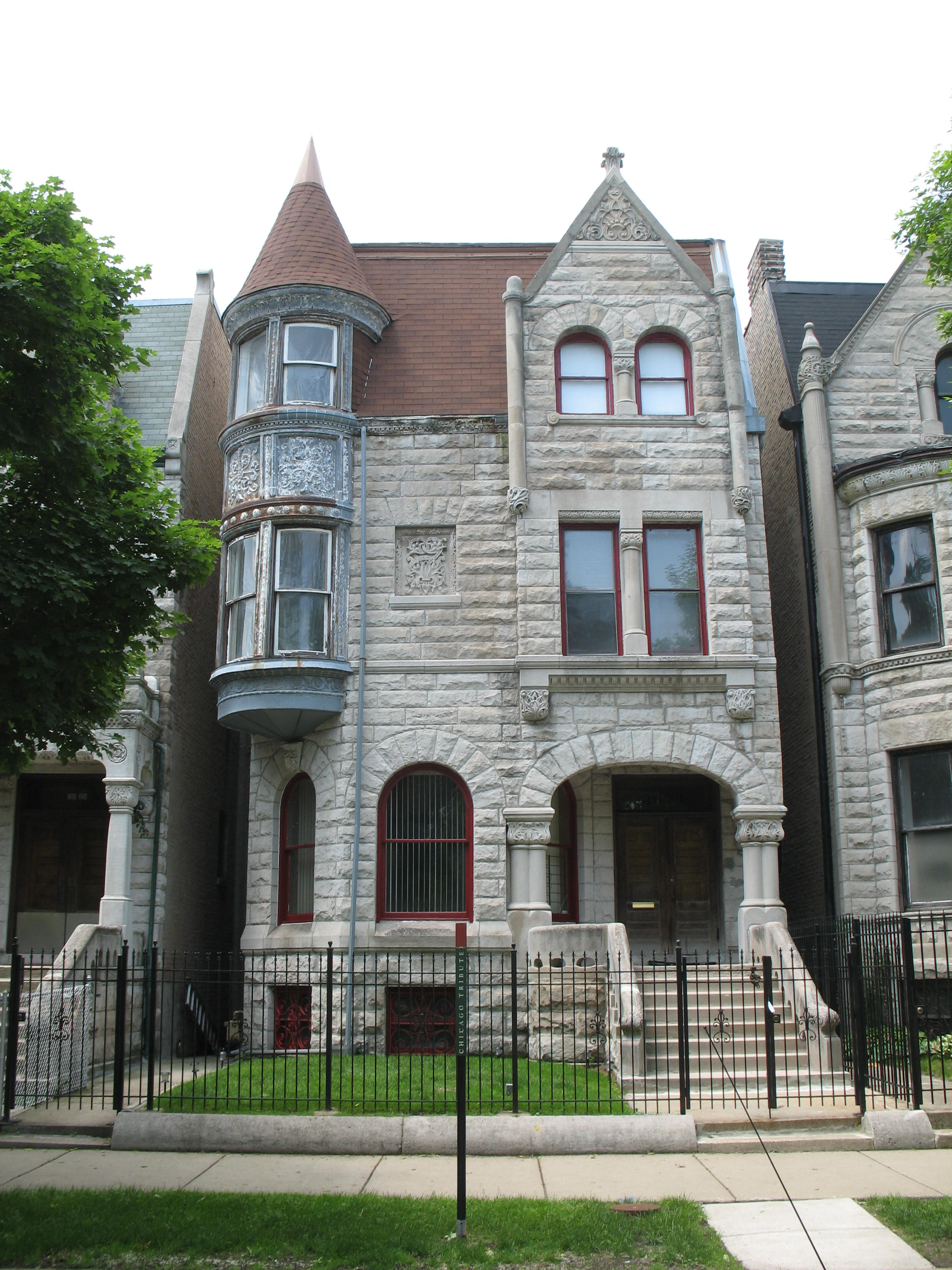
- June 1, 2007, view

- Location within Chicago metropolitan area Location within Illinois Location within the United States
- Location: 3624 S. Martin Luther King Jr. Blvd., Chicago, IL
- Coordinates: 41°49′47″N 87°37′3″W
- Built: 1889
- Architectural style: Renaissance Revival
- NRHP reference No.: 74000757

Significant dates
- Added to NRHP: May 30, 1974
- Designated NHL: May 30, 1974
- Designated CHICL: October 2, 1995

The Ida B. Wells-Barnett House was the residence of civil rights advocate Ida B. Wells (1862–1931) and her husband Ferdinand Lee Barnett from 1919 to 1930. It is located at 3624 S. Dr. Martin Luther King Jr. Drive in the Bronzeville section of the Douglas community area on the South Side of Chicago, Illinois. It was designated a Chicago Landmark on October 2, 1995. It was listed on the National Register of Historic Places and as a National Historic Landmark on May 30, 1974.

== Description and history ==
The Ida B. Wells-Barnett House is located on Chicago's South Side, on the west side of Martin Luther King Jr. Drive roughly midway between 35th and 37th streets. It is a three-story structure built out of ashlar granite in the Romanesque Revival style which was popular around 1890. The front facade is divided into a large right bay, a smaller left bay, and an angled left corner section, from which a turreted bay projects on the second and third levels. The main entrance is deeply recessed behind a segmented arch in the right bay; the other bays have windows set in round-arch openings. The right bay is topped by a gabled wall dormer with a pair of round-arch windows at its center. The interior's original layout had a side hall plan, with public rooms on the ground floor, bedrooms on the second, and a ballroom on the third. The building has been subdivided into apartments.

The house was built about 1889–90 to a design by architect Joseph Thain. It was purchased in 1919 by writer and activist Ida B. Wells and her husband, attorney Ferdinand Lee Barnett, and served as the couple's home until 1929. Of three addresses they were known to have lived at in Chicago, this is the best preserved. Wells, born into slavery in Mississippi in 1862, was educated at Rust College and became a teacher. She was an outspoken advocate for African-American civil rights, and regularly wrote about the brutality of the Jim Crow south, particularly on the subject of lynching. In the early 1890s she met Barnett, a Chicago attorney also active in civil rights; they married in 1895. Wells continued her writing and activism, and was a founding organizer of the NAACP.

== Gallery ==
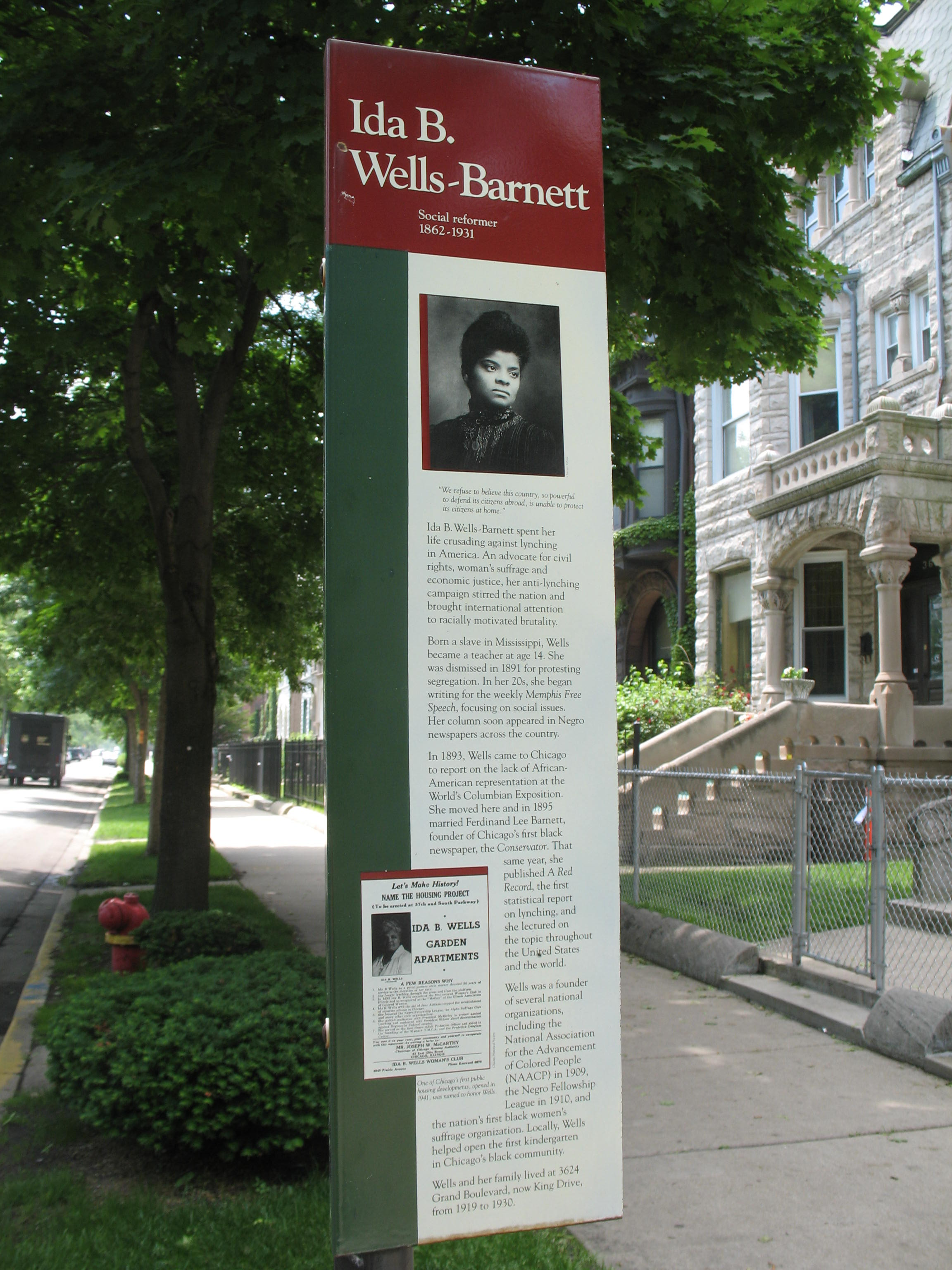
Tribute on front lawn

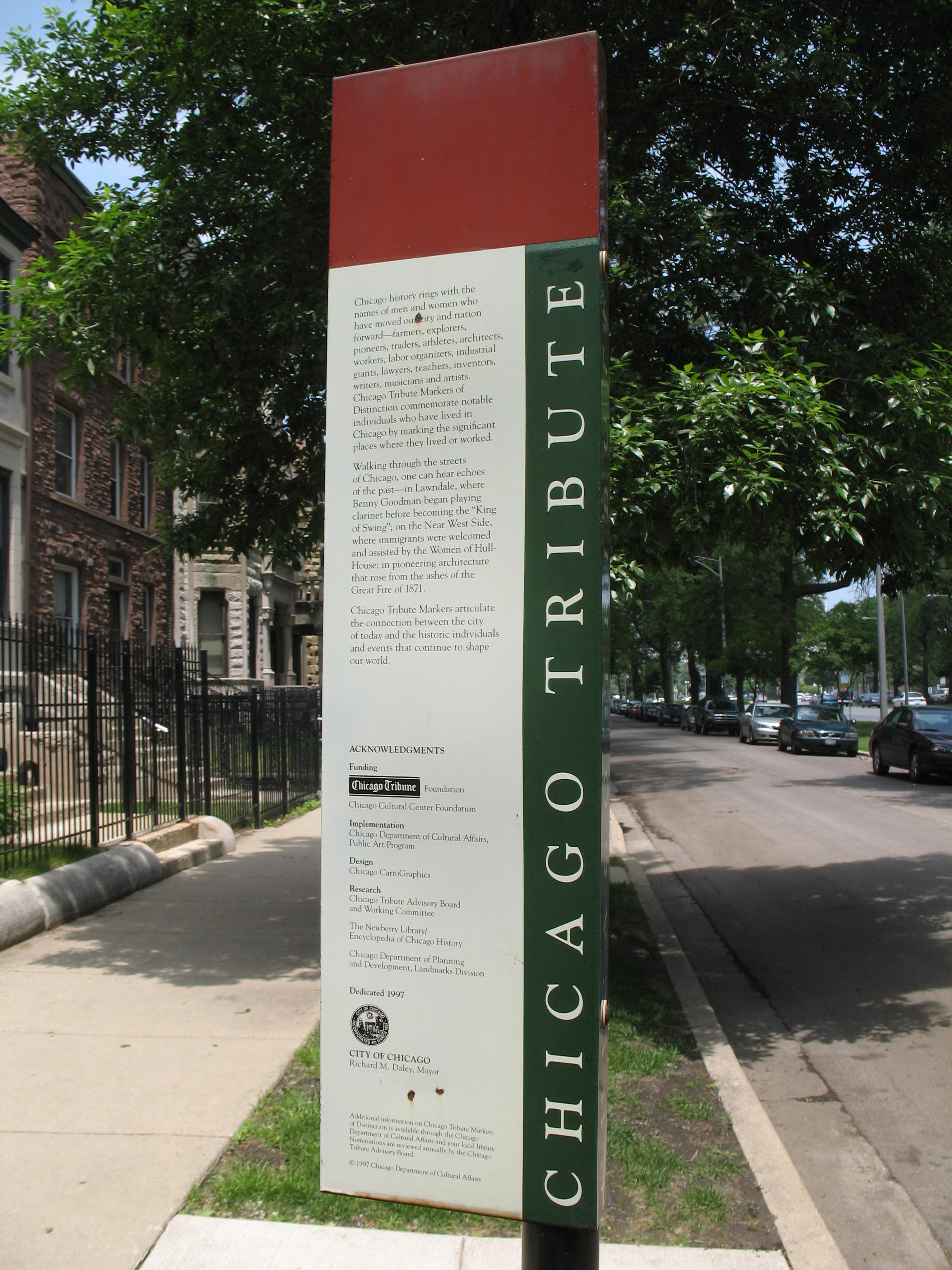
Tribute continued

== See also ==
- List of National Historic Landmarks in Illinois
- National Register of Historic Places listings in South Side Chicago
