= Hotel Windermere =

Coordinates: 41°47′37″N 87°35′5″W

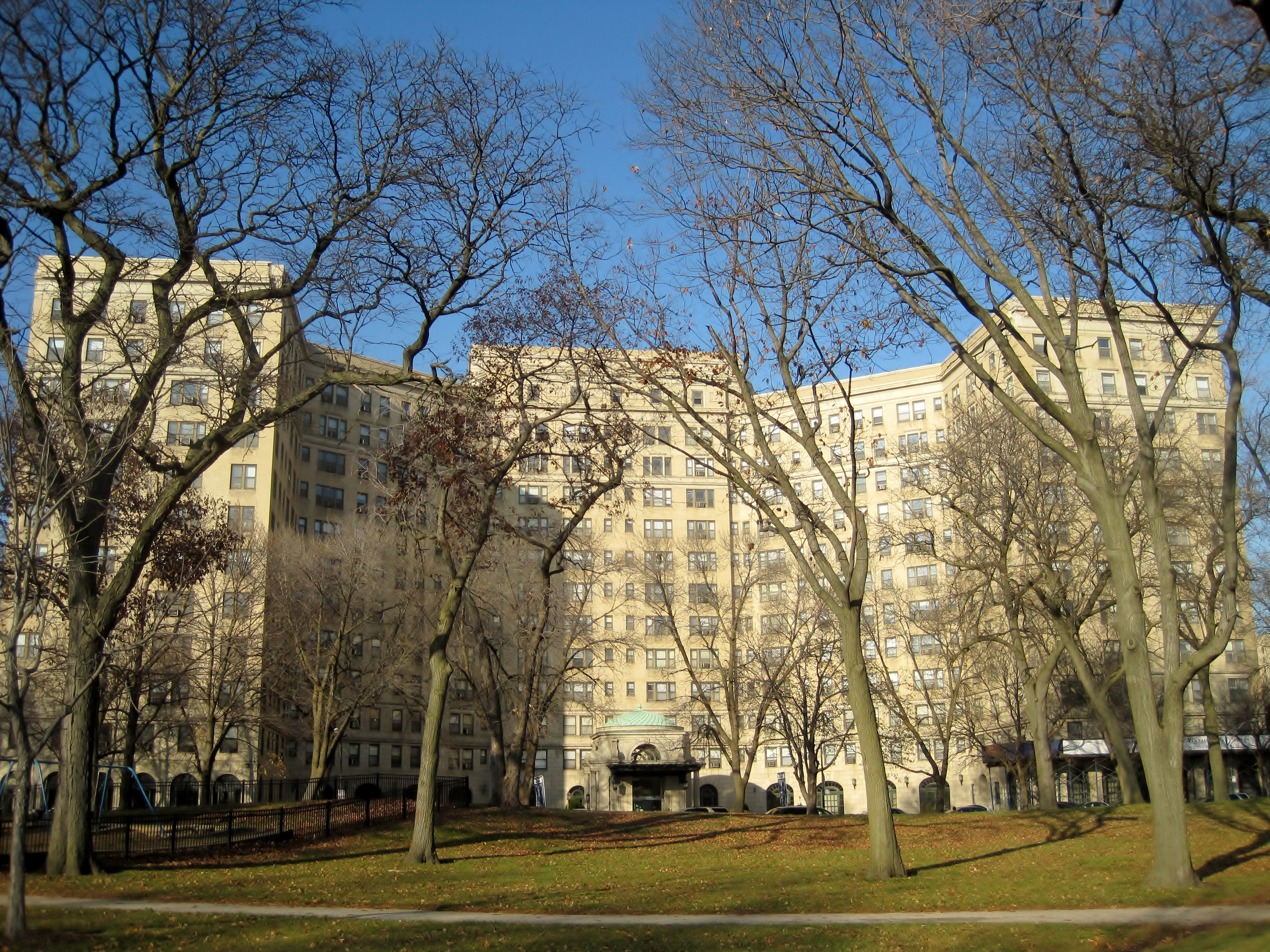
- Hotel Windermere East
- Interactive map of the Hotel Windermere area

General information
- Location: Hyde Park, Chicago
- Opening: 1892
- Closed: 1959 (Wimdermere West); 1981 (Windermere East)

Design and construction
- Architects: Rapp & Rapp

Other information
- Number of rooms: 482

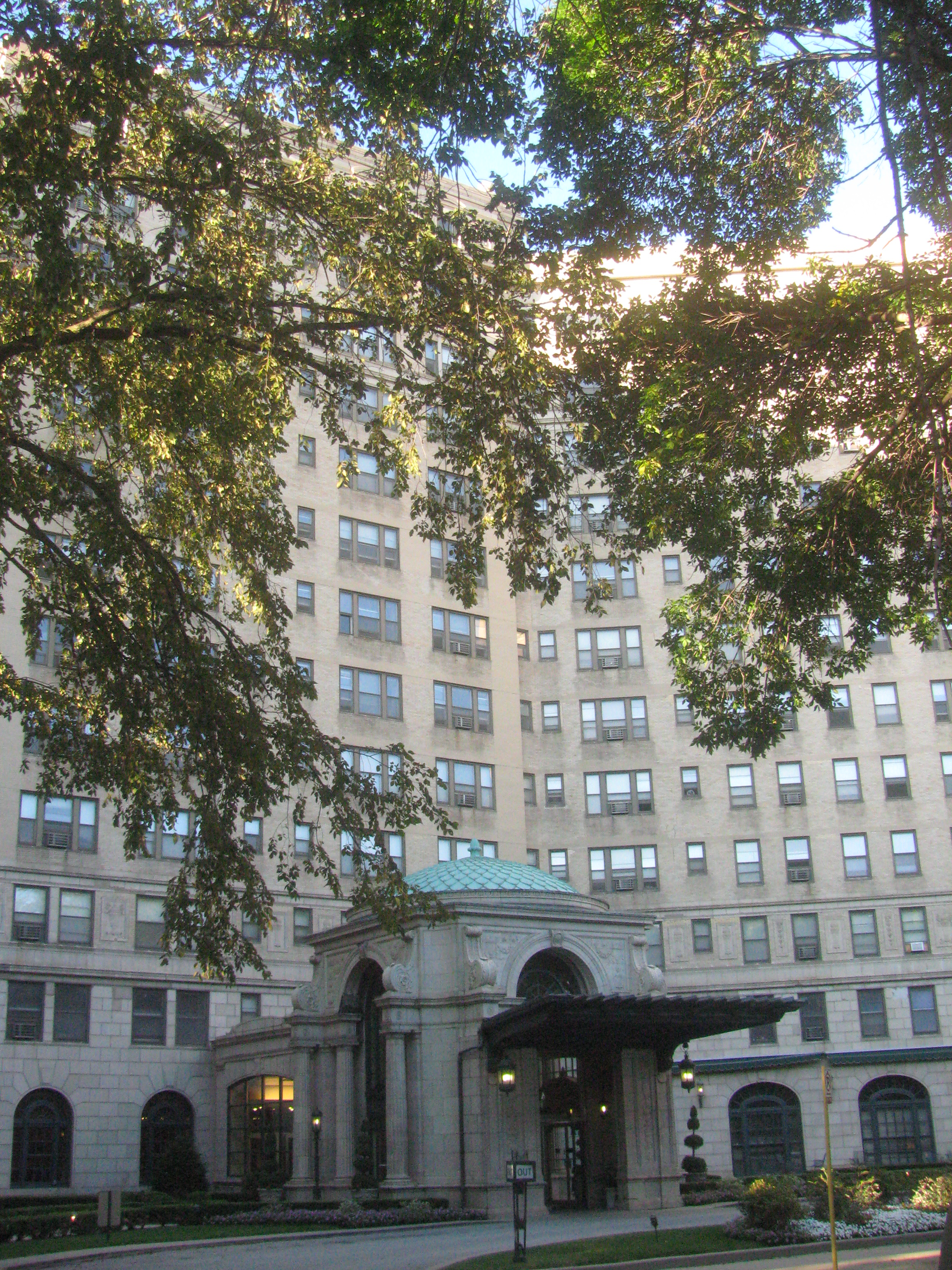

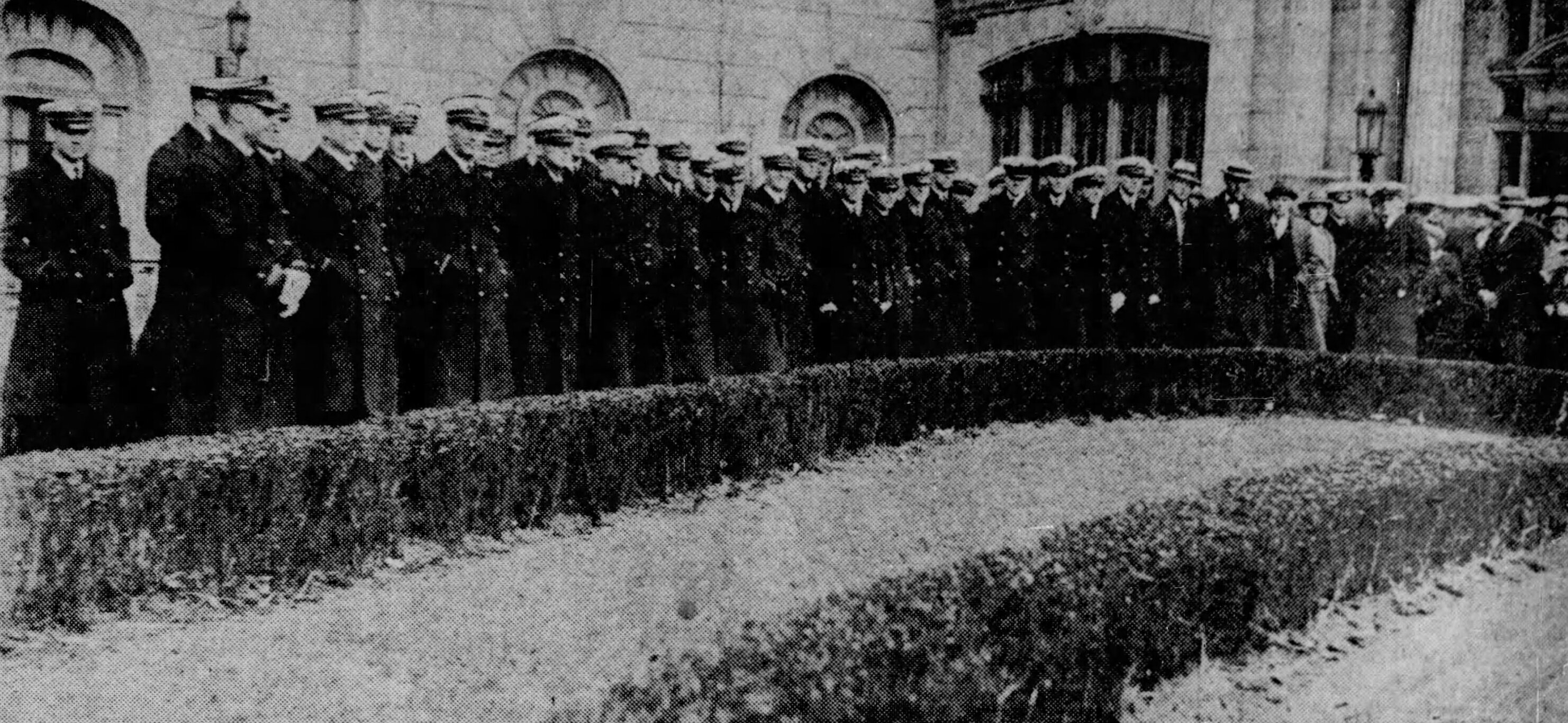
1926 Army Cadets football team staying at the hotel ahead of the 1926 Army–Navy Game at Soldier Field

Hotel Windermere was a hotel in the Hyde Park community area of Chicago, Illinois, United States.

The hotel was located at 56th Street and Cornell Avenue, and was built in 1892 for the 1893 World's Columbian Exposition. In 1924, it was rebuilt with a West and East hotel under Rapp and Rapp, who also built the Chicago Theatre and the Tivoli Theatre. The 12-story hotel had 482 guest rooms and 200 apartments and had a tunnel connecting the two hotels. Over the years, Windermere East attracted guests such as John Rockefeller, Philip Roth, George Burns and Gracie Allen, and American football teams.

Hotel Windermere West was demolished in 1959 to make way for a parking lot. Hotel Windermere East was converted into apartments in 1981 and placed on the National Register of Historic Places in 1982 under the title Hotel Windermere East.

== See also ==
- National Register of Historic Places listings in South Side Chicago
