= Greater Tabernacle Cathedral =

- Our Lady of the Holy Rosary Church/Holy Rosary Church
- U.S. National Register of Historic Places
- Greater Tabernacle Cathedral, formerly Holy Rosary Church
- Location: 11300 S. Dr. Martin Luther King Jr. Drive, Chicago, Illinois
- Coordinates: 41.6889°N 87.6133°W
- Built: 1890
- Architect: Solon Spencer Beman
- Architectural style: Romanesque Revival
- NRHP reference No.: 100010217
- Added to NRHP: April 15, 2024

Greater Tabernacle Cathedral, formerly known as Our Lady of the Holy Rosary Church or Holy Rosary Church, is a historic church at 11300 S. Dr. Martin Luther King Jr. Drive in the Roseland neighborhood of Chicago. Built between 1886 and 1890, the Romanesque Revival church was designed by Solon Spencer Beman, the architect responsible for much of the neighboring planned industrial community of Pullman. Originally constructed for a Catholic parish established in 1882, the building has housed the Greater Tabernacle Cathedral, a congregation affiliated with the Church of God in Christ, since 2016.

The church is particularly noted for its connection to Barack Obama, who maintained an office in the rectory while working as a community organizer with the Developing Communities Project in the 1980s.

The property was designated a Chicago Landmark on July 19, 2023, and was added to the National Register of Historic Places on April 15, 2024.
