= Robert A. Millikan House =

Historic house in Chicago, Illinois

- U.S. National Register of Historic Places
- U.S. National Historic Landmark
- U.S. Historic district – Contributing property
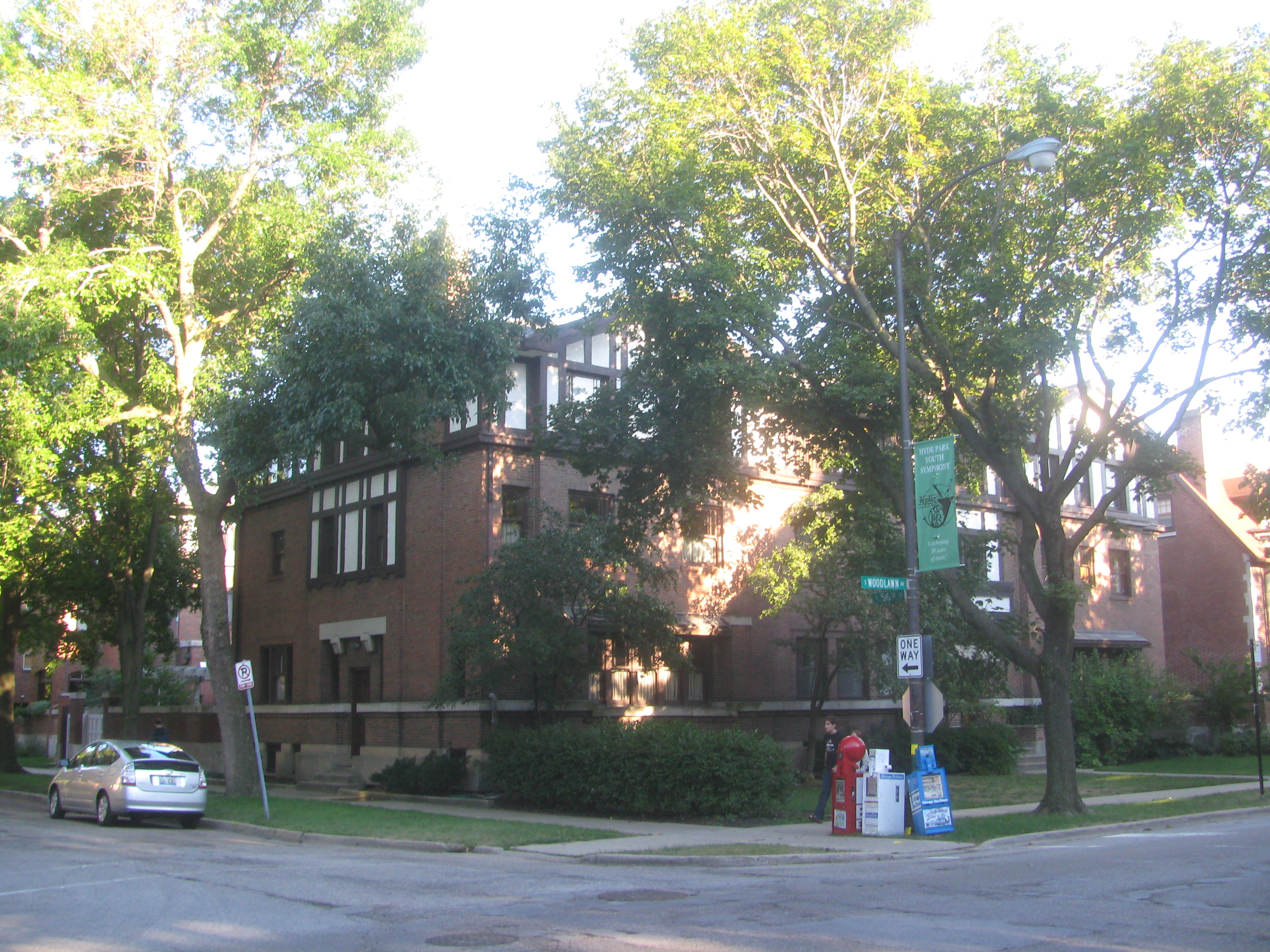

- Location within Chicago metropolitan area Location within Illinois Location within the United States
- Location: 5605 S. Woodlawn Ave. Chicago, IL
- Coordinates: 41°47′33.75″N 87°35′47.09″W
- Area: less than one acre
- Built: 1907
- Architect: Tallmadge & Watson
- Architectural style: Prairie School
- Part of: Hyde Park–Kenwood Historic District (ID79000824)
- NRHP reference No.: 76000699

Significant dates
- Added to NRHP: May 11, 1976
- Designated NHL: May 11, 1976

The Robert A. Millikan House is a historic house at 5605 South Woodlawn Avenue in the Hyde Park community area of Chicago, Illinois. Built about 1907, it was the home of American physicist Robert A. Millikan (1868-1953) from about 1908 until 1921, the period in which he made his most significant Nobel Prize winning work. The three-story brick building earned National Historic Landmark status on May 11, 1976.

== Description and history ==
The Robert A. Millikan House stands in Chicago's South Side Hyde Park neighborhood, northeast of the University of Chicago campus at the southeast corner of South Woodlawn Avenue and East 56th Street. It is one of a sequence of three adjacent houses designed by the Chicago firm Tallmadge & Watson and built about 1907. It is three stories in height, with a mainly brick exterior. It has a broad profile in the Prairie style, with slightly projecting broad gabled sections near the ends, and a narrower off-center entrance projecting. The full third level, and the second level of the entrance section, are finished in Tudor-style half timbering. Window placement and size are somewhat irregular. The building interior is relatively plain.

Robert Millikan, an Illinois native who received the first Ph.D. in physics from Columbia University, moved into this house about 1907. He was at the time serving as a professor and researcher in the University of Chicago physics department. It is there that he organized and performed his famous oil-drop experiment, which provided the most accurate measure of the time of the electrical charge of an electron. He also established an experimental apparatus that was used to confirm the photoelectric effect postulated by Albert Einstein in 1905. For these works, Millikan was awarded the 1923 Nobel Prize in Physics. Millikan was seen then as one of the leaders of growing American dominance in his field.

Millikan moved out of this house in 1921, when he took a position at what is now the California Institute of Technology. The house remains a private residence.

== See also ==
- List of National Historic Landmarks in Illinois
- National Register of Historic Places listings in South Side Chicago
