= Daniel Hale Williams House =

Historic house in Chicago, Illinois

- Dr. Daniel Hale Williams House
- U.S. National Register of Historic Places
- U.S. National Historic Landmark
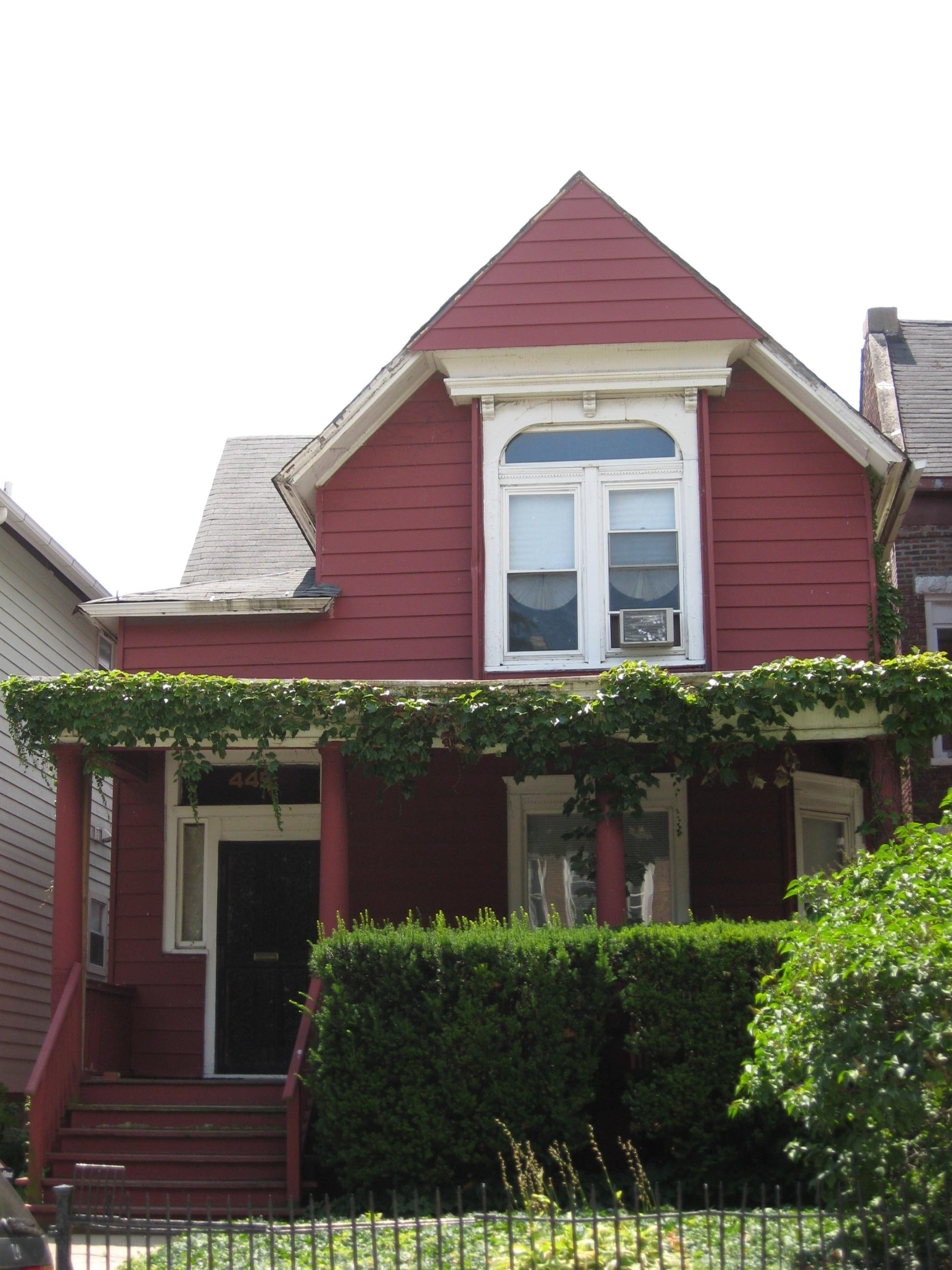
- Dr. Daniel Hale Williams House

- Location within Chicago metropolitan area Location within Illinois Location within the United States
- Location: 445 E. 42nd Street, Chicago, IL
- Coordinates: 41°49′7.43″N 87°36′54.93″W
- Built: 1905
- Architectural style: Queen Anne
- NRHP reference No.: 75000655

Significant dates
- Added to NRHP: May 15, 1975
- Designated NHL: May 15, 1975

The Daniel Hale Williams House is the former home of Dr. Daniel Hale Williams (1856-1931), one of the first major African American surgeons. Located at 445 East 42nd Street in the Grand Boulevard community area of Chicago Illinois, the building was designated a National Historic Landmark in 1975.

== Description and history ==
The Daniel Hale Williams House stands on the south side of 42nd Street on Chicago's South Side, about 1/2 block east of Martin Luther King Jr. Boulevard. It is a modest 1 1/2-story wood-frame structure, with a roughly L-shaped plan covered by a gabled roof. The front facade has a single-story porch across it, sheltering the main entrance in the left bay, and a polygonal window bay in the right. In the gable above the bay there is a sash window topped by a gabled cornice. The house is not of particular architectural interest, and is estimated to have been built about 1905, when it was purchased by Daniel Hale Williams.

Dr. Williams is best known as the first American doctor to perform what would later be known as open heart surgery. In 1893, he operated on a man who had received a stab wound to the heart. At the time the prevailing practice for dealing with direct wounds to the heart was to let the patient die, since it was considered impossible to operate directly on the heart.

Williams was also influential in promoting the development of African-American medical practitioners. Since most white-controlled hospitals were reluctant to take on African-American interns, nurses, and other staff, Williams successfully established the Provident Hospital and Training School, the nation's first hospital and training school controlled by African-Americans. Under his leadership, it trained a generation of medical professionals to exacting standards, and is where he performed the above-described operation.

== See also ==
- List of National Historic Landmarks in Illinois
- National Register of Historic Places listings in South Side Chicago
