= Roloson Houses =

Historic houses in Chicago, Illinois

- Robert Roloson Houses
- U.S. National Register of Historic Places
- Chicago Landmark
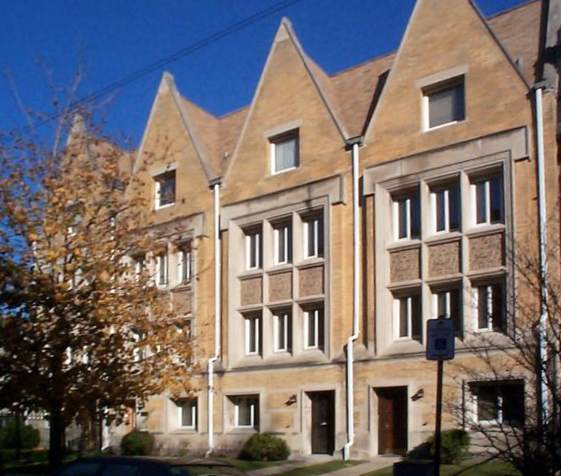

- Location within Chicago metropolitan area Location within Illinois Location within the United States
- Location: 3213-3219 S. Calumet Ave., Chicago, Illinois
- Coordinates: 41°50′9.8″N 87°37′4.8″W
- Built: 1894
- Architects: Wright, Frank Lloyd
- NRHP reference No.: 77000479

Significant dates
- Added to NRHP: June 30, 1977
- Designated CHICL: December 27, 1979

The Roloson Houses, also known as the Robert W. Roloson Houses, are a group of four adjacent row houses in the Douglas community area of Chicago, Illinois, United States. The houses were designed in 1894 by architect Frank Lloyd Wright (1867–1959) for client Robert W. Roloson (1848–1925). Construction was begun in 1894 and completed in early 1895.

They were listed on the National Register of Historic Places in 1977. They were designated a Chicago Landmark on December 27, 1979.

== See also ==
- List of Frank Lloyd Wright works
- National Register of Historic Places listings in South Side Chicago
