= Arthur H. Compton House =

Historic house in Chicago, Illinois

- U.S. National Register of Historic Places
- U.S. National Historic Landmark
- U.S. Historic district – Contributing property
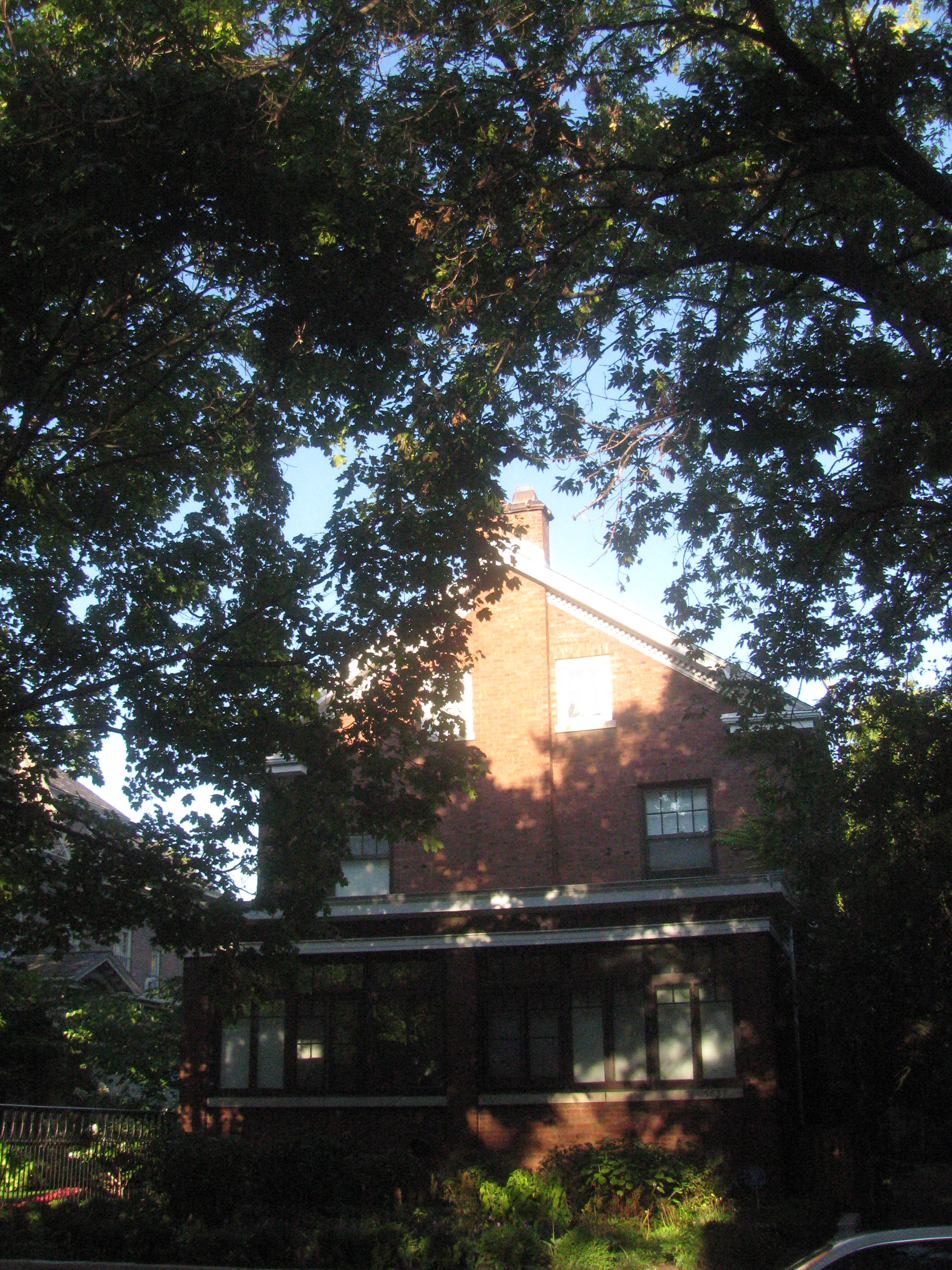

- Location within Chicago metropolitan area Location within Illinois Location within the United States
- Location: 5637 South Woodlawn Ave., Chicago, IL
- Coordinates: 41°47′32″N 87°35′46″W
- Area: less than one acre
- Built: 1916
- Part of: Hyde Park–Kenwood Historic District (ID79000824)
- NRHP reference No.: 76000687

Significant dates
- Added to NRHP: May 11, 1976
- Designated NHL: May 11, 1976

The Arthur H. Compton House is a historic house at 5637 South Woodlawn Avenue in Chicago, Illinois. Built in 1905 and designed by architects Holabird & Roche, it was the residence of physicist Arthur Compton (1892–1962) from 1928 until 1945. Compton discovered the Compton Effect in 1923, proving that light has both a particle and a wave aspect. Compton received the Nobel Prize in Physics in 1927 for this discovery. His house was designated a National Historic Landmark in 1976.

== Description and history ==
The Arthur H. Compton House is located in Chicago's Hyde Park neighborhood, northeast of the University of Chicago campus. It is located on the east side of South Woodlawn Avenue, between East 56th and East 57th Streets. It is an architecturally undistinguished 2 1/2-story brick building with a gabled roof. A flat-roof single-story enclosed porch extends across the front, with a chimney rising in front of the ridge between the porch and main block. The main entrance is on the right side of the house. The interior follows a central hall plan, and has been little altered since Compton's period of ownership.

Compton, a native of Wooster, Ohio, was educated at The College of Wooster and Princeton University, where he received a Ph.D. in physics. In 1919, as a fellow of the National Research Council, he spent a year in England, where he participated in X-ray scattering experiments at Cavendish Laboratory. In 1923 he joined the faculty of the University of Chicago, where he continued to research X-ray scattering, and in 1923 published his groundbreaking paper on the Compton Effect. He later supported the efforts of Enrico Fermi to harness nuclear power, supporting advances for its use in both military and civilian applications.

== See also ==
- List of National Historic Landmarks in Illinois
- National Register of Historic Places listings in South Side Chicago
