= Elijah Muhammad House =

Historic house in Chicago, Illinois

- U.S. National Register of Historic Places
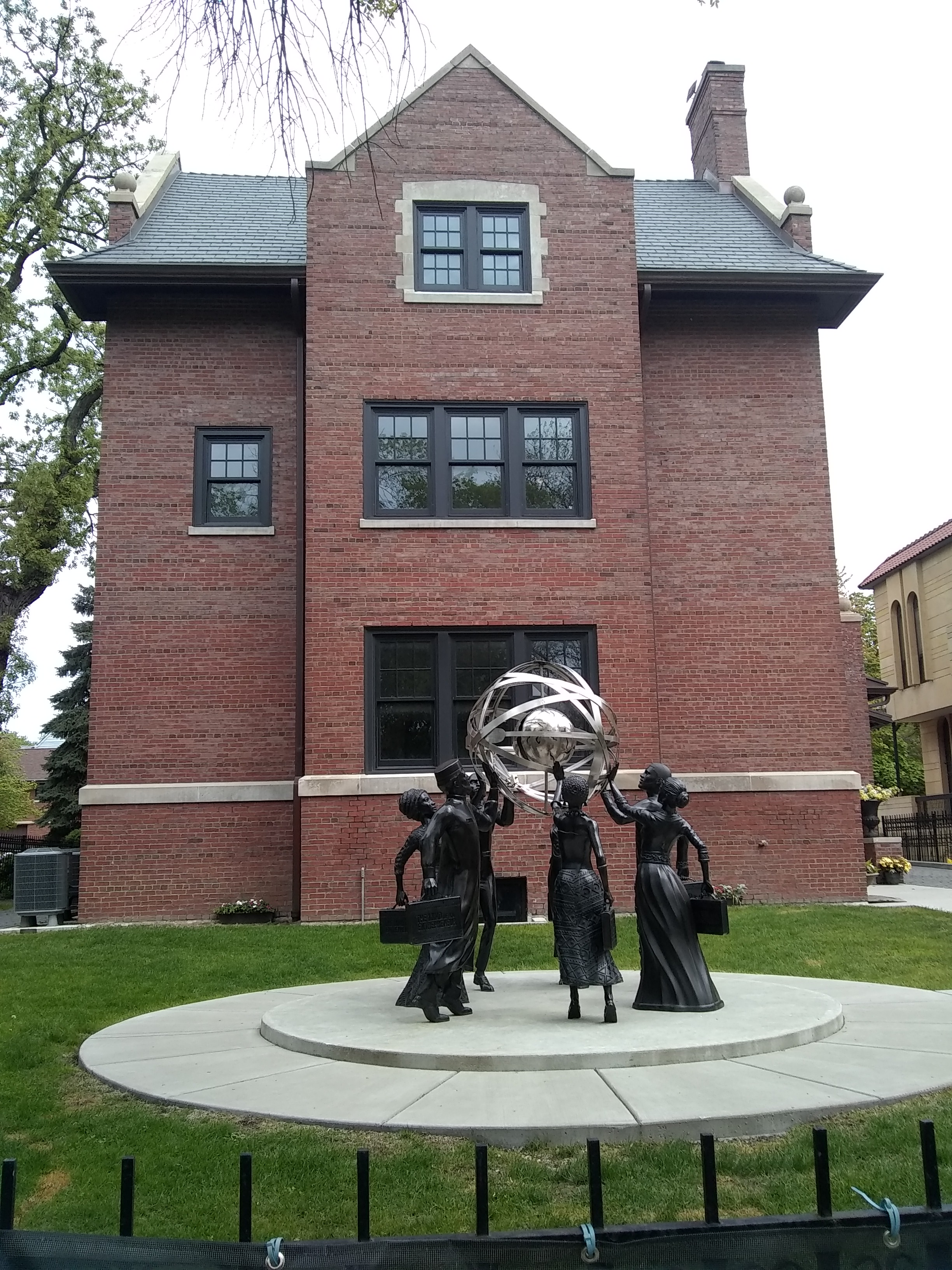
- Location: 4847 South Woodlawn Avenue, Kenwood, Chicago
- Coordinates: 41.8064°N 87.5967°W
- Website: supportsajdahhouse.com
- NRHP reference No.: 100007536
- Added to NRHP: 2022-03-22

The Honorable Elijah Muhammad House, also known as Sajdah House, is a historic home on South Woodlawn Avenue in the Kenwood community in Chicago. The house was home to Elijah Muhammad, the leader of the Nation of Islam, from 1952 until his death in 1975.

== Building ==
The Elijah Muhammad House is a 12,000 sq ft (1,100 m^{2}) house. It was built by businessman William French Burrows and his wife Annie Libby Burrows in 1902. Annie was a member of the Libby family who founded the canned food company Libby, McNeill & Libby, and William served as the company's president, and chairman. The house was vacant for 15 to 20 years before it was purchased by Elijah Muhammad in 1952.

The Autobiography of Malcolm X recounts that Muhammad had moved into the house at the insistence of "his children and his followers" shortly before the two men met for the first time in 1952. After hearing Muhammad preach for the first time at Temple Number Two in Chicago, Malcolm X was hosted by Muhammad at his home.

Muhammad also hosted many other prominent activists and leaders at his home including Martin Luther King Jr. and Coretta Scott King, Thurgood Marshall, Muhammad Ali, Kwame Toure, and James Baldwin.

Muhammad lived in the house until his death in 1975. The house was "long vacant and falling into disrepair" when it was purchased by developer Wendy Muhammad in 2018. According to Wendy Muhammad, the house was vacant for "about 20 years" and was in foreclosure when she bought it.

=== Preservation ===
The house was purchased by Wendy Muhammad in 2018 for conversion to a museum and is managed to the Wendy L. Muhammad Foundation Trust. It was added to the United States National Register of Historic Places in March 2022. The museum was a recipient of a Preservation Excellence Award from the Chicago Department of Planning and Development in 2025.
