= Strand Hotel (Chicago) =

- U.S. National Register of Historic Places
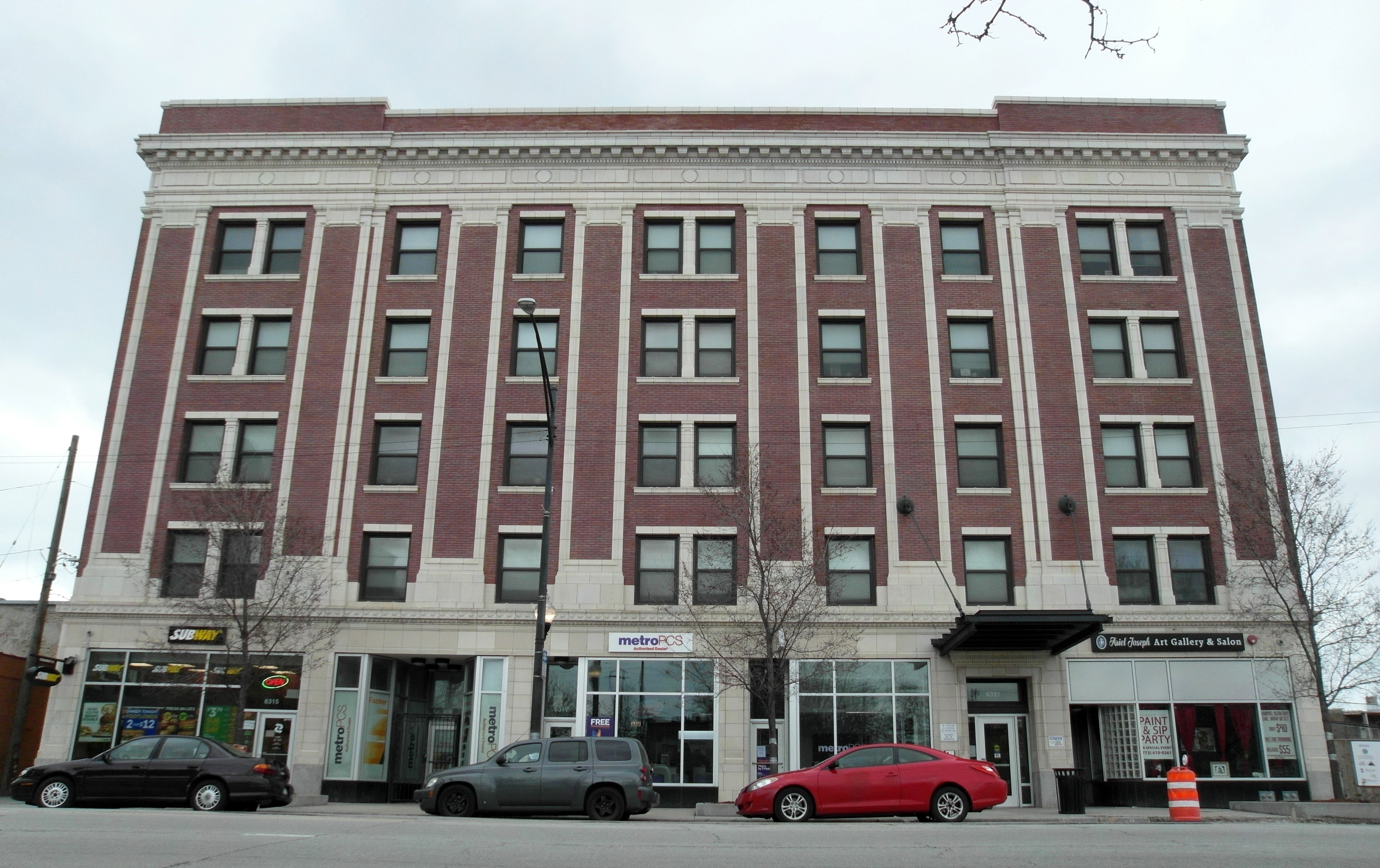

- Location within Chicago metropolitan area Location within Illinois Location within the United States
- Location: 6315-6323 S. Cottage Grove Ave., Chicago, Illinois
- Coordinates: 41°46′47″N 87°36′21″W
- Area: 0.4 acres (0.16 ha)
- Built: 1915
- Architect: Davis & Davis
- Architectural style: Classical Revival
- NRHP reference No.: 12001237
- Added to NRHP: January 29, 2013

The Strand Hotel is a historic apartment hotel at 6315-6323 S. Cottage Grove Avenue in the Woodlawn neighborhood of Chicago, Illinois.

Opened in 1915, the hotel offered both traditional guest rooms and long-term residences for customers who sought luxury amenities in apartment-style housing.

Architects Davis & Davis designed the Classical Revival building, which has a red brick exterior with a terra cotta clad first floor, piers outlined in terra cotta, and an entablature and cornice at its roof. The hotel included a restaurant and banquet hall, the latter of which was used as a live music venue for many years. Once part of a major commercial district in Woodlawn, the hotel is now one of its few remnants and the only surviving apartment hotel building in the neighborhood.

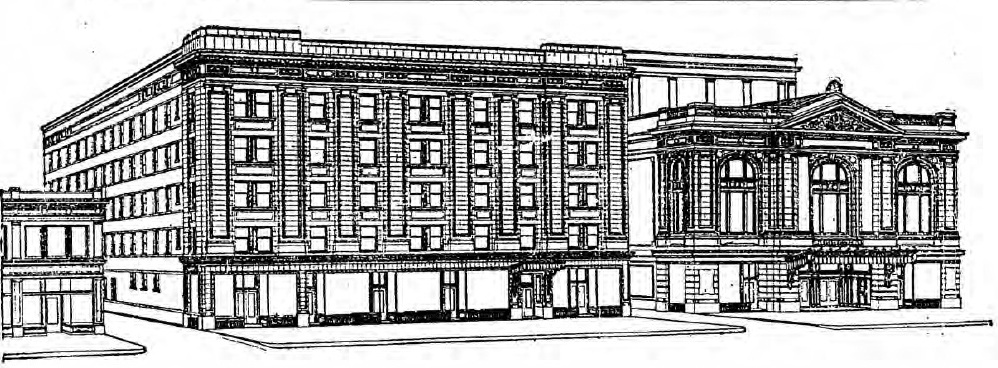
1914 depiction of the hotel in the Chicago Tribune

The hotel was added to the National Register of Historic Places on January 29, 2013.

The hotel was acquired in 2014, and a $23 million renovation was completed in Fall 2016, turning into mixed use and affordable housing. The renovation won Landmark Illinois' "Project of the Year" award in 2016.
