= Gage Park Bungalow Historic District =

- U.S. National Register of Historic Places
- U.S. Historic district
- Location within Chicago metropolitan area Location within Illinois Location within the United States
- Location: Roughly bounded by West 55th St., South Washtenaw Ave., West 59th St. & South Sacramento Ave., Chicago, Illinois
- Coordinates: 41°47′24″N 87°41′42″W
- Architectural style: Chicago Bungalow
- MPS: Chicago Bungalows MPS
- NRHP reference No.: 16000895
- Added to NRHP: March 13, 2020

The Gage Park Bungalow Historic District is a residential historic district in the Gage Park neighborhood of Chicago, Illinois. The district includes 465 Chicago bungalows and eighteen other residential buildings. The bungalows were built between 1919 and 1931, a time in which single-family homeownership became broadly accessible in Chicago; as bungalows could be mass-built affordably, they appealed to these new homeowners. Gage Park, an underbuilt neighborhood in southwest Chicago, was one of the many outlying areas of the city in which large numbers of new bungalows were built in the early twentieth century. While the bungalows have a consistent shape and are set back evenly from the street, giving the district a uniform appearance, variations in color, brick patterns, and roof forms differentiate the individual houses.

The district was added to the National Register of Historic Places on March 13, 2020.

== Architecture ==
The district’s houses follow the characteristic Chicago bungalow form: narrow, rectangular brick buildings generally rising one-and-a-half stories above full basements. Common features include low-pitched hipped roofs, broad overhanging eaves and large front windows. Although the houses share a consistent scale and setback, variations in brickwork, roof forms and decorative details distinguish individual buildings.
