= Muddy Waters House =

- U.S. National Register of Historic Places
- U.S. National Historic Landmark District
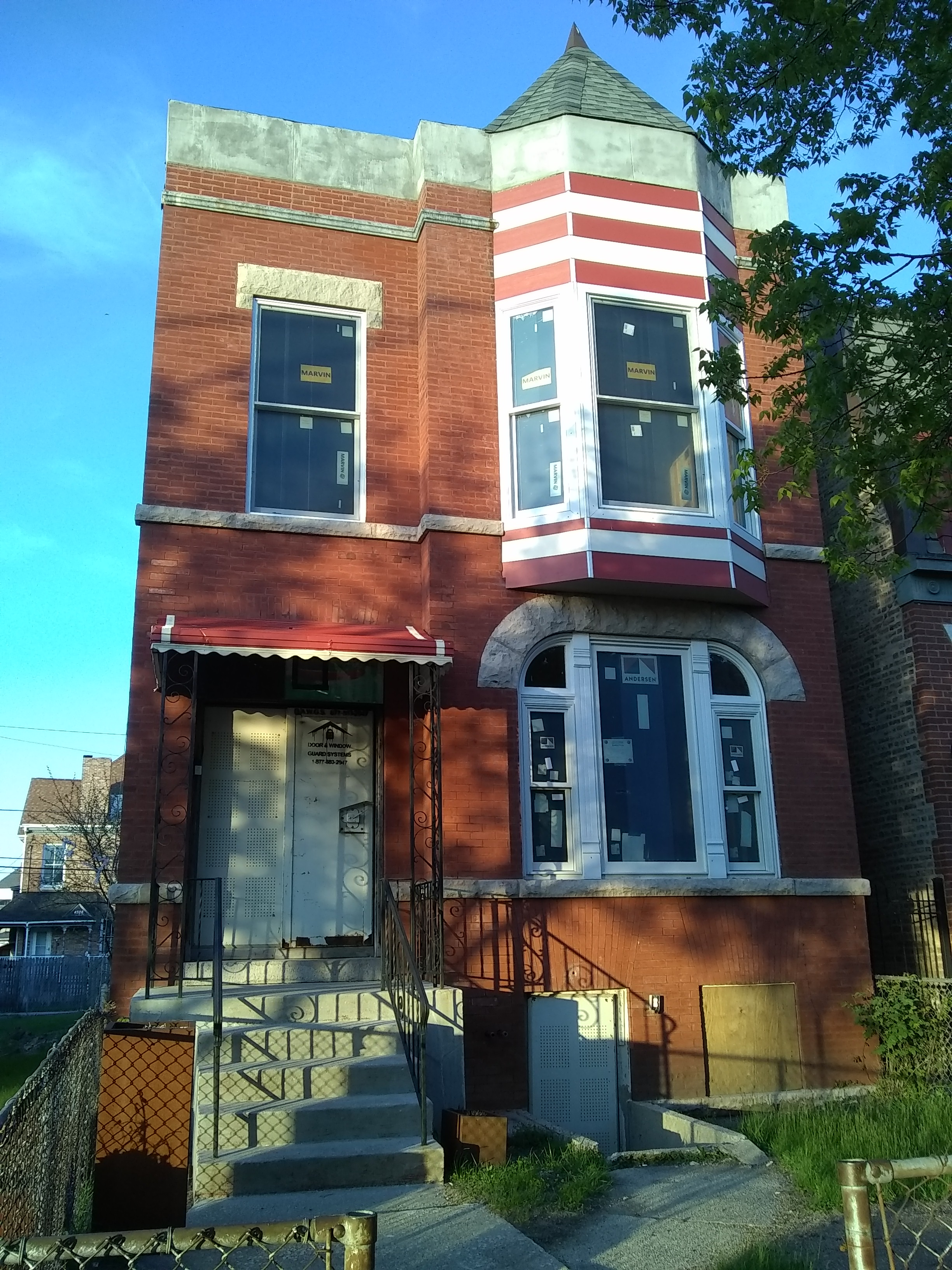
- Location: 4339 South Lake Park Avenue, Chicago
- Website: https://www.mojomuseum.com
- NRHP reference No.: 100008485
- Added to NRHP: December 23, 2002

The Muddy Waters House, also known as the McKinley and Geneva Morganfield House, was the home of McKinley Morganfield, better known as Muddy Waters.

The house is located at 4339 South Lake Park Avenue, in the North Kenwood neighborhood of Chicago.

The property was bought by Waters in 1956, and was the first house he purchased after moving to Chicago from the South. He lived there until 1973.

Waters lived on the first floor, rented out the top floor and had his recording studio in the basement. Known as the “unofficial center for the Chicago Blues community,” the house became a gathering place for musicians including Howlin’ Wolf and Chuck Berry.

The property is now owned by Waters’ great-granddaughter, Chandra Cooper, and is being converted into The MOJO Muddy Waters House Museum.

== Landmark recognition ==
In 2021 the property was granted landmark status by the Commission on Chicago Landmarks. In 2022 the property was added to the National Register of Historic Places by the National Park Service
