= King Drive =

Street in Chicago, Illinois

Dr. Martin Luther King Jr. Drive
- 400 East
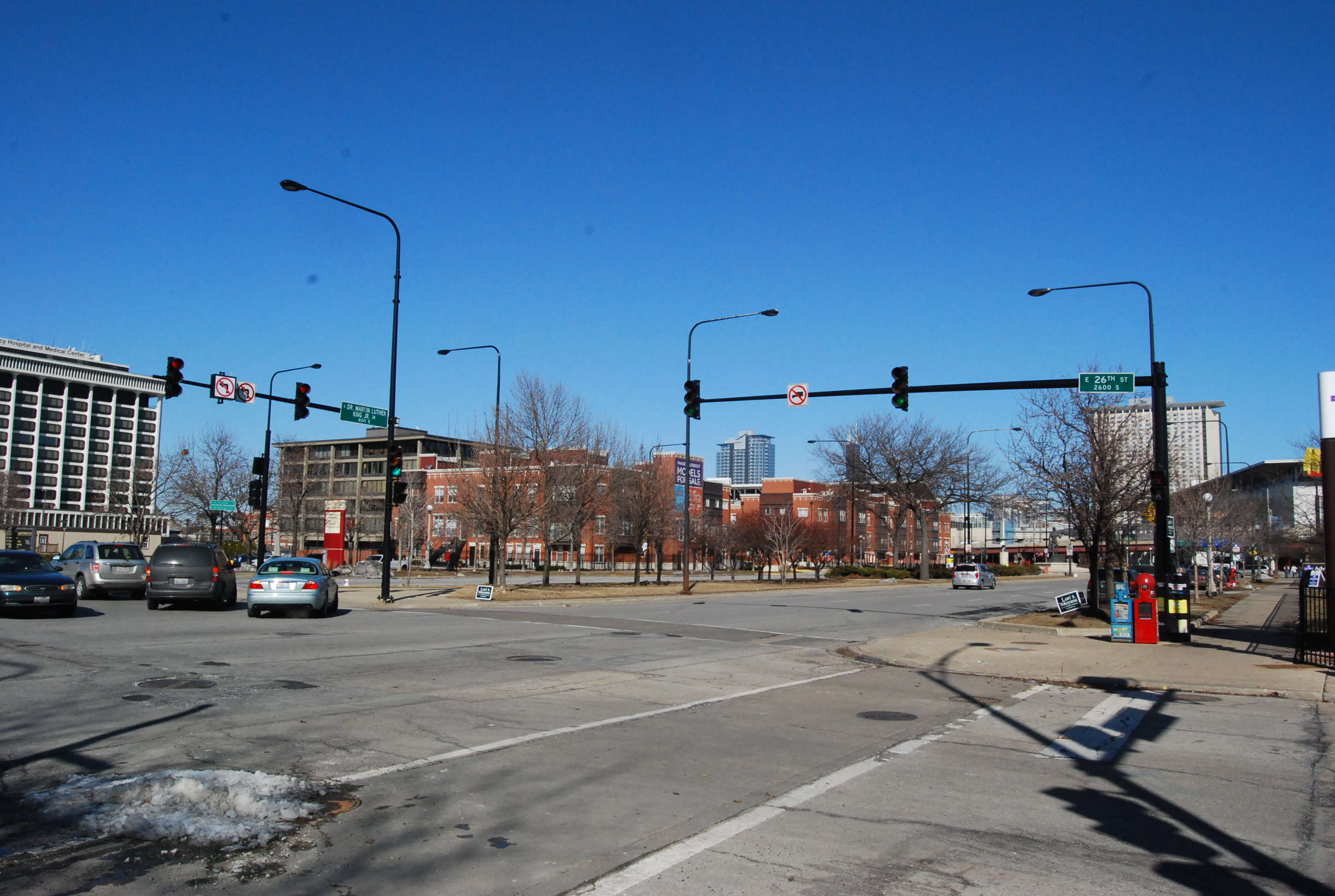
- King Drive at 26th Street (2011)
- Interactive map of Dr. Martin Luther King Jr. Drive
- Former name: Grand Boulevard; South Park Avenue
- Location: Chicago
- South end: 115th Street (11500 S)
- Major junctions: I-55 in Chicago; US 12 / US 20 in Chicago
- North end: Cermak Road (2200 S)

Dr. Martin Luther King Jr. Drive, commonly referred to as King Drive, is a major north–south street on the South Side of Chicago. It was formerly named South Park Way, and originally called Grand Boulevard. Chicago became the first city in the world to name a street after Dr. Martin Luther King, Jr. in 1968 following his assassination. The street runs continuously from Cermak Road (22nd Street) on the north to 115th Street on the south. It runs at 400 East or four blocks east of State Street in Chicago's city grid. The street is a major corridor of Black history and culture in Chicago.

== Route description ==
=== McCormick Place and Bronzeville ===
King Drive begins at Cermak Road (22nd Street) by McCormick Place in the Near South Side community area. Just south of McCormick Place, the street runs underneath the Stevenson Expressway (Interstate 55). Here, King Drive enters the Douglas community area, The northern half of the historic Bronzeville neighborhood, a focal point of Black History and culture in Chicago. At 25th Street, just south of the expressway, there is the Monument to the Great Northern Migration. a statue honoring the African Americans who migrated from the Southern United States north to Chicago. From here to 35th Street, King Drive is a wide commercial thoughofare with walk of fame to African-American pioneers who made their impact on American history along the sidewalks. At 30th Street is Dunbar High School. At 31st Street is the historic Olivet Baptist Church, the oldest operating African American Baptist church in Chicago and the second oldest African American congregation in the city. At 33rd Street is the site of Camp Douglas, a Civil War POW Camp marked by a historic marker. At, 35th Street, is the Victory Monument dedicated to the Black WWI soldiers of the Eight Regiment. The road from here to 51st Street is a wide historic boulevard in the middle with many historic homes and churches along residential side streets including the Ida B. Wells-Barnett House at 36th & King Drive where the civil rights activist lived.

From Pershing Road (3900 South) to 51st Street, King Drive runs through the Grand Boulevard community area which makes up the southern half of the historic Bronzeville neighborhood. Notable landmarks in this section include the Oscar Stanton De Priest House, Chicago Defender newspaper office of the prominent Black Chicago newspaper, Harold Washington Cultural Center and the Robert S. Abbott House where the founder of the Chicago Defender lived.

=== From Washington Park to Woodlawn ===
From 51st Street to 60th Street, King drive runs through the Washington Park community area and runs parallel to the large park of the same name. A statue of President George Washington, the namesake of the park and neighborhood is present in the median of 51st Street and King Drive. At 59th Street is the former home of Jesse Binga, an early Black businessman and banker. At, 63rd Street The road crosses under the King Drive station on the East 63rd branch of the CTA Green Line. From 63rd Street to Marquette Road (6700 South), King Drive runs along the edge Parkway Garden Homes, where First Lady Michelle Obama lived early on as a child.

=== From Marquette Road south to 115th Street ===
Just south of Marquette Road, King Drive crosses under the Chicago Skyway (Interstate 90) and under a large section of freight tracks. From here on south the road runs as a larger street through a more residential area. At the southeast corner of King Drive and 95th Street in the Roseland community area is Chicago State University a historic Black university. At 99th Street, King Drive crosses over the Bishop Ford Freeway (Interstate 94). It continues south to 115th Street where it dead ends along the border between the Roseland and West Pullman community areas near the Kensington/115th Street station on the Metra Electric District.

== Transportation ==
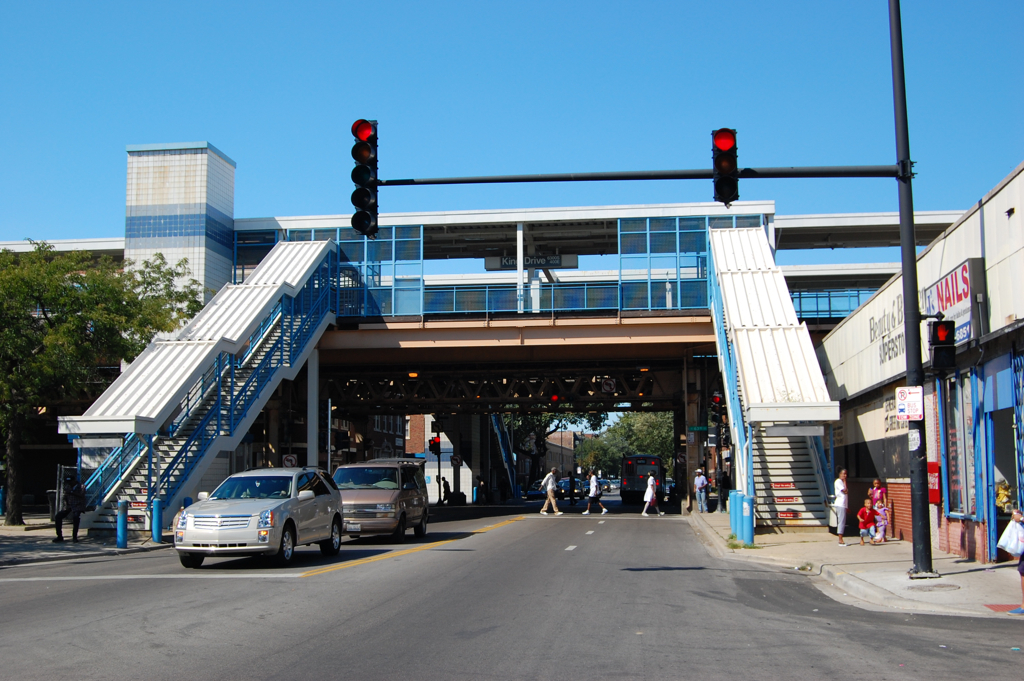
King Drive station, as viewed from the eponymous street

King Drive is served by two Chicago Transit Authority bus routes: routes 3 and 111.

The 3 King Drive runs daily from Northwestern Memorial Hospital on the Near North Side to 95th/Dan Ryan Red Line station. After departing from the said hospital, the route travels south along Michigan Avenue in Downtown and the Near South Side before turning east along Cermak Road near Wintrust Arena. The route curves south toward King Drive at McCormick Place and continues toward 95th Street. The route turns west along 95th Street toward the aforementioned Red Line station.

The 111 King Drive/111th Street runs daily between the 95th/Dan Ryan to Marshfield Plaza, a shopping center at 117th Street/Marshfield via 95th Street, King Drive 111th Street and Marshfield.

There is a CTA train station at King Drive on the Green Line's East 63rd branch. The Metra Electric District's Kensington/115th Street station is near the southern end of King Drive at 115th Street.

== See also ==
- List of streets named after Martin Luther King Jr.
