= List of National Historic Landmarks in Illinois =

Illinois National Historic Landmarks (clickable map)

This list of National Historic Landmarks in Illinois, has 89 entries including Eads Bridge, which spans into Missouri and which the National Park Service credits to Missouri's National Historic Landmark list. Also added are two sites that were once National Historic Landmarks before having their designations removed. All National Historic Landmarks of the United States are also listed on the more general, National Register of Historic Places.

The National Historic Landmark Program is administered by the National Park Service, a branch of the Department of the Interior. The National Park Service determines which properties meet NHL criteria and makes nomination recommendations after an owner notification process. The Secretary of the Interior reviews nominations and, based on a set of predetermined criteria, makes a decision on NHL designation or a determination of eligibility for designation. Both public and privately owned properties can be designated as NHLs. This designation provides indirect, partial protection of the historic integrity of the properties via tax incentives, grants, monitoring of threats, and other means. Owners may object to the nomination of the property as an NHL. When this is the case the Secretary of the Interior can only designate a site as eligible for designation.

== Current NHLs in Illinois ==
	National Historic Landmark
^{†}	National Historic Landmark District
^{#}	National Historic Site, National Historical Park, National Memorial, or National Monument
^{*}	Delisted Landmark

- Numbers represent an ordering by significant words. Different colors, defined here, differentiate the National Historic Landmark Districts from other NHL buildings, structures, sites or objects.

	Landmark name	Image	Date designated	Location	County	Description
1	Robert S. Abbott House	Robert S. Abbott House	December 8, 1976 (#76000686)	Chicago; 41°48′29″N 87°36′58″W	Cook	A home of Robert S. Abbott, founder of the Chicago Defender newspaper.
2	Adler Planetarium	Adler Planetarium	February 27, 1987 (#87000819)	Chicago; 41°51′59″N 87°36′27″W	Cook	First and oldest planetarium in the western hemisphere.
3	Auditorium Building	Auditorium Building	May 15, 1975 (#70000230)	Chicago; 41°52′33″N 87°37′28″W	Cook	Building designed by Dankmar Adler and Louis Sullivan.
4^{†}	Bishop Hill Colony	Bishop Hill Colony	April 27, 1970 (#70000244)	Bishop Hill; 41°12′01″N 90°07′08″W	Henry	Historic district of Swedish dissident commune founded in 1846.
5	Cahokia Mounds	Cahokia Mounds	July 19, 1964 (#66000899)	Collinsville; 38°39′14″N 90°03′52″W	Madison and St. Clair	Largest archaeological site related to Mississippian culture, and largest pre-Columbian earthworks in North America north of Mexico. Also a UNESCO World Heritage Site
6	Carson, Pirie, Scott, and Company Store	Carson, Pirie, Scott, and Company Store	May 15, 1975 (#70000231)	Chicago; 41°52′55″N 87°37′40″W	Cook	Architect Louis Sullivan-designed building.
7	James Charnley House	James Charnley House	August 5, 1998 (#70000232)	Chicago; 41°54′26″N 87°37′39″W	Cook	One of the few surviving residential works of Louis Sullivan and features major contributions by Frank Lloyd Wright.
8	Chicago Board of Trade Building	Chicago Board of Trade Building	June 2, 1978 (#78003181)	Chicago; 41°52′41″N 87°37′56″W	Cook	Skyscraper designed by Holabird & Root, housed the world's largest trading floor when built in 1930.
9	Church of the Holy Family	Church of the Holy Family	April 15, 1970 (#70000851)	Cahokia; 38°34′13″N 90°11′18″W	St. Clair	A church dating from 1799.
10^{†}	Columbus Park	Columbus Park	July 31, 2003 (#91000567)	Chicago; 41°52′26″N 87°46′11″W	Cook	Magnum opus of landscape architect Jens Jensen.
11	Arthur H. Compton House	Arthur H. Compton House	May 11, 1976 (#76000687)	Chicago; 41°47′33″N 87°35′47″W	Cook	Home of Nobel Prize–winning physicist who proved light has both wave and particle aspects, the Compton Effect.
12	Avery Coonley House	Avery Coonley House	December 30, 1970 (#70000243)	Riverside; 41°49′07″N 87°49′43″W	Cook	Frank Lloyd Wright-designed home, in Riverside Historic District
13	Crow Island School	Crow Island School	December 14, 1990 (#89001730)	Winnetka; 42°06′04″N 87°44′46″W	Cook	An elementary school designed by Perkins&Will and Eliel & Eero Saarinen. Model for the now-widespread Winnetka Plan school design.
14	Susan Lawrence Dana House	Susan Lawrence Dana House	January 7, 1976 (#74000774)	Springfield; 39°47′38″N 89°39′07″W	Sangamon	A Frank Lloyd Wright-designed house.
15	David Davis House	David Davis House	May 15, 1975 (#72001479)	Bloomington; 40°28′54″N 88°58′50″W	McLean	Home of Associate Justice of the Supreme Court of the United States and Abraham Lincoln campaign manager David Davis.
16	Charles G. Dawes House	Charles G. Dawes House	December 8, 1976 (#76000706)	Evanston; 42°02′33″N 87°40′23″W	Cook	Home of Charles Gates Dawes, Nobel Peace Prize recipient and Vice President to Calvin Coolidge.
17	John Deere Home and Shop	John Deere Home and Shop	July 19, 1964 (#66000327)	Grand Detour; 41°53′48″N 89°24′53″W	Ogle	Site of the invention of the first steel plow by John Deere.
18	Oscar Stanton DePriest House	Oscar Stanton DePriest House	May 15, 1975 (#75000646)	Chicago; 41°48′35″N 87°37′05″W	Cook	Home of the first post-Reconstruction African-American US congressman.
19	Jean Baptiste Point Du Sable Homesite	Jean Baptiste Point Du Sable Homesite	May 11, 1976 (#76000690)	Chicago; 41°53′16″N 87°37′24″W	Cook	Home of a Chicago's first settler, an African-American.
20	Eads Bridge	Eads Bridge	January 29, 1964 (#66000946)	East St. Louis; 38°37′39″N 90°11′08″W	St. Clair	A combined road and railway bridge which was, when completed in 1874, the longest arch bridge in the world. Extends into St. Louis, Missouri.
21	Farm Creek Section	Farm Creek Section	December 9, 1997 (#91002039)	East Peoria; 40°40′32″N 89°29′23″W	Tazewell	Site of exposed geological strata.
22	Farnsworth House	Farnsworth House	February 17, 2006 (#04000867)	Plano; 41°38′06″N 88°32′09″W	Kendall	A one-room home designed by Ludwig Mies van der Rohe.
23	John Farson House	John Farson House	June 19, 1996 (#72000454)	Oak Park; 41°53′07″N 87°48′02″W	Cook	The most famous work of George Washington Maher.
24	Sam and Ruth Van Sickle Ford House	Sam and Ruth Van Sickle Ford House	December 11, 2023 (#100009821)	404 S. Edgelawn Dr. 41°45′12″N 88°21′33″W	Kane	Prominent work of organic architect Bruce Goff.
25	Fort De Chartres	Fort De Chartres	October 9, 1960 (#66000329)	Prairie du Rocher; 38°05′05″N 90°09′29″W	Randolph	French fort built in 1720. Its powder magazine is believed to be oldest standing building in Illinois.
26^{†}	Fort Sheridan Historic District	Fort Sheridan Historic District	April 20, 1984 (#80001379)	Fort Sheridan; 42°12′45″N 87°48′38″W	Lake	An area originally established as a United States Army Post. The campus was designed by Holabird & Roche.
27	Henry Gerber House	Henry Gerber House	July 21, 2015 (#15000584)	Chicago; 41°54′47″N 87°38′10″W	Cook	Gerber established the Society for Human Rights, the first American gay rights organization, here in the 1920s.
28	John J. Glessner House	John J. Glessner House	January 7, 1976 (#70000233)	Chicago; 41°51′28″N 87°37′15″W	Cook	A 19th century house designed by Henry Hobson Richardson.
29	Ulysses S. Grant Home	Ulysses S. Grant Home	December 19, 1960 (#66000322)	Galena; 42°24′36″N 90°25′23″W	Jo Daviess	A house given to General of the Army Ulysses S. Grant following the Civil War. Grant was elected President of the United States while residing here.
30^{†}	Grosse Point Lighthouse	Grosse Point Lighthouse	January 20, 1999 (#76000707)	Evanston; 42°03′50″N 87°40′34″W	Cook	A lighthouse on the shores of Lake Michigan, built in 1873 the wake of several shipping disasters.
31	Haymarket Martyrs' Monument	Haymarket Martyrs' Monument	February 18, 1997 (#97000343)	Forest Park; 41°52′11″N 87°49′11″W	Cook	A monument in Waldheim Cemetery commemorating the Haymarket Riot.
32	Hegeler-Carus Mansion	Hegeler-Carus Mansion	March 29, 2007 (#95000989)	LaSalle; 41°20′09″N 89°05′13″W	LaSalle	Designed by Chicago architect William W. Boyington for Edward C. Hegeler, a partner in a nearby zinc company. It was later the home of his son-in-law, publisher and philosopher Paul Carus.
33	Isidore H. Heller House	Isidore H. Heller House	August 18, 2004 (#72000450)	Chicago; 41°48′05″N 87°35′50″W	Cook	A Frank Lloyd Wright-designed house.
34	Arthur Heurtley House	Arthur Heurtley House	February 16, 2000 (#00000258)	Oak Park; 41°53′34″N 87°47′59″W	Cook	Frank Lloyd Wright-designed house.
35	Hull House	Hull House	June 23, 1965 (#66000315)	Chicago; 41°52′17″N 87°38′50″W	Cook	One of the first settlement houses in the U.S., founded by Jane Addams.
36	Illinois and Michigan Canal Locks And Towpath	Illinois and Michigan Canal Locks And Towpath	January 29, 1964 (#66000332)	Joliet; 41°34′11″N 88°04′11″W	Will	A canal that helped establish transportation from the Great Lakes to the Mississippi River and the Gulf of Mexico. It established Chicago as a major center of commerce.
37	Nicholas Jarrot Mansion	Nicholas Jarrot Mansion	August 7, 2001 (#74002197)	Cahokia; 38°34′12″N 90°11′14″W	St. Clair	A mansion built in 1799 for a fur trader.
38	Kennicott Grove	Kennicott Grove	January 7, 1976 (#73000698)	Glenview; 42°05′13″N 87°52′12″W	Cook	The home of Robert Kennicott, an American naturalist.
39	Kincaid Site	Kincaid Site	July 19, 1964 (#66000326)	Brookport; 37°04′50″N 88°29′30″W	Massac and Pope	Archaeological site of one of the largest prehistoric Mississippian culture settlements.
40	Leiter II Building	Leiter II Building	January 7, 1976 (#76000695)	Chicago; 41°52′28″N 87°37′39″W	Cook	Longtime flagship store of Sears, Roebuck & Co., designed by William Le Baron Jenney.
41	Frank R. Lillie House	Frank R. Lillie House	May 11, 1976 (#76000696)	Chicago; 41°47′22″N 87°35′35″W	Cook	Former home of embryologist Frank Rattray Lillie.
42	Abraham Lincoln Home	Abraham Lincoln Home	December 19, 1960 (#71000076)	Springfield; 39°47′43″N 89°38′41″W	Sangamon	The only house ever owned by America's 16th president.
43^{†}	Lincoln Park Lily Pool	Lincoln Park Lily Pool	February 17, 2006 (#06000235)	Chicago; 41°55′31″N 87°38′03″W	Cook	An example of Prairie School landscape architecture designed by Alfred Caldwell.
44	Lincoln Tomb	Lincoln Tomb	December 19, 1960 (#66000330)	Springfield; 39°49′24″N 89°39′21″W	Sangamon	The tomb of America's 16th president, Abraham Lincoln.
45	Vachel Lindsay House	Vachel Lindsay House	November 11, 1971 (#71000297)	Springfield; 39°47′45″N 89°38′58″W	Sangamon	Home of poet Vachel Lindsay.
46	Owen Lovejoy House	Owen Lovejoy House	February 18, 1997 (#73000690)	Princeton; 41°22′18″N 89°26′55″W	Bureau	Home of prominent abolitionist Owen Lovejoy.
47	Marquette Building	Marquette Building	January 7, 1976 (#73000697)	Chicago; 41°52′49″N 87°37′46″W	Cook	Skyscraper designed by Holabird & Roche.
48	Marshall Field Company Store	Marshall Field Company Store	June 2, 1978 (#78001123)	Chicago; 41°53′01″N 87°37′40″W	Cook	Designed by Daniel Burnham, it was the longtime flagship store of Marshall Field's.
49	Mazon Creek Fossil Beds	Mazon Creek Fossil Beds	September 25, 1997 (#97001272)	Morris; 41°19′16″N 88°20′46″W	Grundy	Lagerstätte of fossils, best known as one of the only sites where Tully Monsters were found.
50	Pierre Menard House	Pierre Menard House	April 15, 1970 (#70000245)	Ellis Grove; 37°57′53″N 89°54′36″W	Randolph	House of fur trader Pierre Menard, the first lieutenant governor of Illinois.
51	Robert A. Millikan House	Robert A. Millikan House	May 11, 1976 (#76000699)	Chicago; 41°47′35″N 87°35′47″W	Cook	Home of Robert A. Millikan, a Nobel Prize-winning physicist.
52	Modoc Rock Shelter	Modoc Rock Shelter	January 20, 1961 (#66000328)	Modoc; 38°03′46″N 90°03′49″W	Randolph	An archaeological site, a rock overhang used as shelter during the Archaic period in North America.
53	Montgomery Ward Company Complex	Montgomery Ward Company Complex	June 2, 1978 (#78001125)	Chicago; 41°53′47″N 87°38′36″W	Cook	The former warehouse and offices of the national headquarters of one of the nation's first mail order companies, Montgomery Ward.
54	Morrow Plots, University of Illinois	Morrow Plots, University of Illinois	May 23, 1968 (#68000024)	Urbana; 40°06′17″N 88°13′34″W	Champaign	World's oldest experimental corn field, and oldest experimental field in Western Hemisphere.
55^{†}	Nauvoo Historic District	Nauvoo Historic District	January 20, 1961 (#66000321)	Nauvoo; 40°32′53″N 91°22′55″W	Hancock	A historic district based around a 19th-century Mormon settlement; beginning of the Mormon Trail.
56	New Philadelphia Townsite	New Philadelphia Townsite	January 16, 2009 (#05000869)	Barry; 39°41′45″N 90°57′35″W	Pike	Site of first U.S. settlement founded by an African-American.
57	Old Kaskaskia Village	Old Kaskaskia Village	July 19, 1964 (#66000324)	Ottawa; 41°19′19″N 88°57′36″W	LaSalle	The best-documented Native American village in the Illinois River Valley.
58	Old Main, Knox College	Old Main, Knox College	July 4, 1961 (#66000323)	Galesburg; 40°56′29″N 90°22′14″W	Knox	Best-preserved site of one of the Lincoln-Douglas debates.
59	Old State Capitol	Old State Capitol	July 4, 1961 (#66000331)	Springfield; 39°47′57″N 89°38′53″W	Sangamon	The fifth capitol building of Illinois. Site of Lincoln's House Divided Speech.
60	Old Stone Gate, Chicago Union Stockyards	Old Stone Gate, Chicago Union Stockyards	May 29, 1981 (#72000451)	Chicago; 41°49′00″N 87°38′54″W	Cook	Entrance to the famous Union Stock Yards, designed by John Wellboorn Root.
61	Orchestra Hall	Orchestra Hall	April 19, 1994 (#78001127)	Chicago; 41°52′45″N 87°37′28″W	Cook	A symphony hall designed by Daniel Burnham.
62^{†}	Principia College Historic District	Principia College Historic District	April 19, 1993 (#93001605)	Elsah; 38°56′56″N 90°20′51″W	Jersey	One of the last major works by Bernard Maybeck.
63^{†}	Pullman Historic District	Pullman Historic District	December 30, 1970 (#69000054)	Chicago; 41°41′50″N 87°36′34″W	Cook	Another historic district of the Pullman Company, including the Hotel Florence.
64	Reliance Building	Reliance Building	January 7, 1976 (#70000237)	Chicago; 41°52′57″N 87°37′40″W	Cook	A building designed by Burnham & Root.
65^{†}	Riverside Historic District	Riverside Historic District	August 29, 1970 (#69000055)	Riverside; 41°49′54″N 87°48′49″W	Cook	Planned community designed by Frederick Law Olmsted and Calvert Vaux.
66	Frederick C. Robie House	Frederick C. Robie House	November 27, 1963 (#66000316)	Chicago; 41°47′25″N 87°35′46″W	Cook	A Prairie style home designed by Frank Lloyd Wright in 1908.
67^{†}	Rock Island Arsenal	Rock Island Arsenal	June 7, 1988 (#69000057)	Rock Island; 41°31′01″N 90°32′31″W	Rock Island	An arsenal and site of a large Union prison camp.
68	Rookery Building	Rookery Building	May 15, 1975 (#70000238)	Chicago; 41°52′45″N 87°37′56″W	Cook	An office building designed by Daniel Burnham and John Wellborn Root.
69	Room 405, George Herbert Jones Laboratory	Room 405, George Herbert Jones Laboratory	May 28, 1967 (#67000005)	Chicago; 41°47′24″N 87°36′04″W	Cook	The laboratory that first isolated plutonium and determined its atomic mass.
70	Sears, Roebuck and Company	Sears, Roebuck and Company	June 2, 1978 (#78001129)	Chicago; 41°52′07″N 87°42′38″W	Cook	The headquarters of Sears, Roebuck and Company for almost seven decades.
71	Second Presbyterian Church	Second Presbyterian Church	March 11, 2013 (#74000754)	Chicago; 41°51′21″N 87°37′28″W	Cook	This church is a masterpiece of the Arts and Crafts movement with an interior by Howard Van Doren Shaw.
72	Shedd Aquarium	Shedd Aquarium	February 27, 1987 (#87000820)	Chicago; 41°52′02″N 87°37′09″W	Cook	Formerly the largest indoor aquarium in the world.
73	Site of the First Self-Sustaining Nuclear Reaction	Site of the First Self-Sustaining Nuclear Reaction	February 18, 1965 (#66000314)	Chicago; 41°47′26″N 87°36′04″W	Cook	Site of the First Self-Sustaining Nuclear Reaction.
74^{†}	South Dearborn Street-Printing House Row North Historic District	South Dearborn Street-Printing House Row North Historic District	January 7, 1976 (#76000705)	Chicago; 41°52′36″N 87°37′41″W	Cook	Encompasses four architecturally significant skyscrapers.
75	S.R. Crown Hall	S.R. Crown Hall	August 7, 2001 (#01001049)	Chicago; 41°50′01″N 87°37′38″W	Cook	Ludwig Mies van der Rohe-designed architecture school building at Illinois Institute of Technology
76	Starved Rock	Starved Rock	October 9, 1960 (#66000325)	Ottawa; 41°19′17″N 88°59′25″W	LaSalle	A Sandstone butte overlooking the Illinois River, purportedly the site of a massacre of the Illinois Confederation.
77^{†}	Adlai E. Stevenson II Farm	Adlai E. Stevenson II Farm	April 22, 2014 (#03000918)	Mettawa; 42°13′44″N 87°55′50″W	Lake	Home of several-time candidate for United States President Adlai E. Stevenson II.
78	Lorado Taft Midway Studios	Lorado Taft Midway Studios	December 21, 1965 (#66000317)	Chicago; 41°47′07″N 87°36′10″W	Cook	Studios of sculptor Lorado Taft, designed by Pond & Pond.
79	F.F. Tomek House	F.F. Tomek House	January 20, 1999 (#99000632)	Riverside; 41°49′56″N 87°49′02″W	Cook	A Frank Lloyd Wright house in the Riverside Historic District
80	Lyman Trumbull House	Lyman Trumbull House	May 15, 1975 (#75000667)	Alton; 38°53′51″N 90°10′35″W	Madison	House of US Senator Lyman Trumbull. He co-authored the Thirteenth Amendment to the United States Constitution.
81	U-505 (German Submarine)	U-505 (German Submarine)	June 29, 1989 (#89001231)	Chicago; 41°51′52″N 87°36′57″W	Cook	German U-boat at Museum of Science and Industry, Chicago
82	Unity Temple	Unity Temple	December 30, 1970 (#70000240)	Oak Park; 41°53′19″N 87°47′48″W	Cook	A temple designed by Frank Lloyd Wright.
83	University Of Illinois Observatory	University Of Illinois Observatory	December 20, 1989 (#86003155)	Urbana; 40°06′15″N 88°13′33″W	Champaign	Site of pioneering research into photoelectric photometry, and the development of the photoelectric cell.
84	The Wayside	The Wayside	November 13, 1966 (#66000320)	Winnetka; 42°06′51″N 87°43′57″W	Cook	Home of Henry Demarest Lloyd.
85	Ida B. Wells-Barnett House	Ida B. Wells-Barnett House	May 30, 1974 (#74000757)	Chicago; 41°49′40″N 87°37′03″W	Cook	Former home of civil rights advocate Ida B. Wells.
86	Frances Willard House	Frances Willard House	June 23, 1965 (#66000318)	Evanston; 42°02′54″N 87°40′43″W	Cook	Former home of temperance reformer Frances Willard, and longtime headquarters of the Woman's Christian Temperance Union.
87	Daniel Hale Williams House	Daniel Hale Williams House	May 15, 1975 (#75000655)	Chicago; 41°49′06″N 87°36′55″W	Cook	The former home of Dr. Daniel Hale Williams, one of the first major African American surgeons.
88	Frank Lloyd Wright Home And Studio	Frank Lloyd Wright Home And Studio	January 7, 1976 (#72000456)	Oak Park; 41°53′36″N 87°48′01″W	Cook	Former home and studio of Frank Lloyd Wright.
89	Wrigley Field	Wrigley Field	September 23, 2020 (Note: Eligibility was granted in 1987) (#100005739)	Chicago; 41°56′50″N 87°39′23″W	Cook	Second-oldest ballpark in Major League Baseball and only remaining Federal League ballpark, home of the Chicago Cubs.

== NHLs formerly located in Illinois ==
The following Landmarks were located in Illinois at the time they were declared National Historic Landmarks, but have since moved to other states.

	Landmark name	Image	Date designated	Location	County	Description
1^{#}	USS Silversides (Submarine)	USS Silversides (Submarine)	January 14, 1986 (#72001566)	Muskegon, Michigan; 43°13′47″N 86°19′58″W	Muskegon	Having sunk a confirmed total of 23 ships during World War II and been awarded 12 battle stars and a Presidential Unit Citation, the Silversides is the most decorated US submarine still in existence. During the war, she patrolled the Pacific Ocean with the mission of preventing crucial supplies and material from reaching the Japanese.

== Former NHLs in Illinois ==
	Landmark name	Image	Date designated	Date withdrawn	Locality	County	Comment
1	Soldier Field (Grant Park Stadium)		February 2, 1987	February 17, 2006	Chicago	Cook	Was declared an NHL on February 27, 1987. The designation was withdrawn on February 17, 2006.
2	President (Steamboat)	SS President	December 20, 1989	July 13, 2011	St. Elmo (formerly)	Fayette (formerly)	A steamboat, out of service, broken down into pieces, and for sale.

== See also ==
- National Register of Historic Places listings in Illinois
- List of National Historic Landmarks by state
- List of National Natural Landmarks in Illinois
