= Sherman Park =

Park in Chicago, Illinois

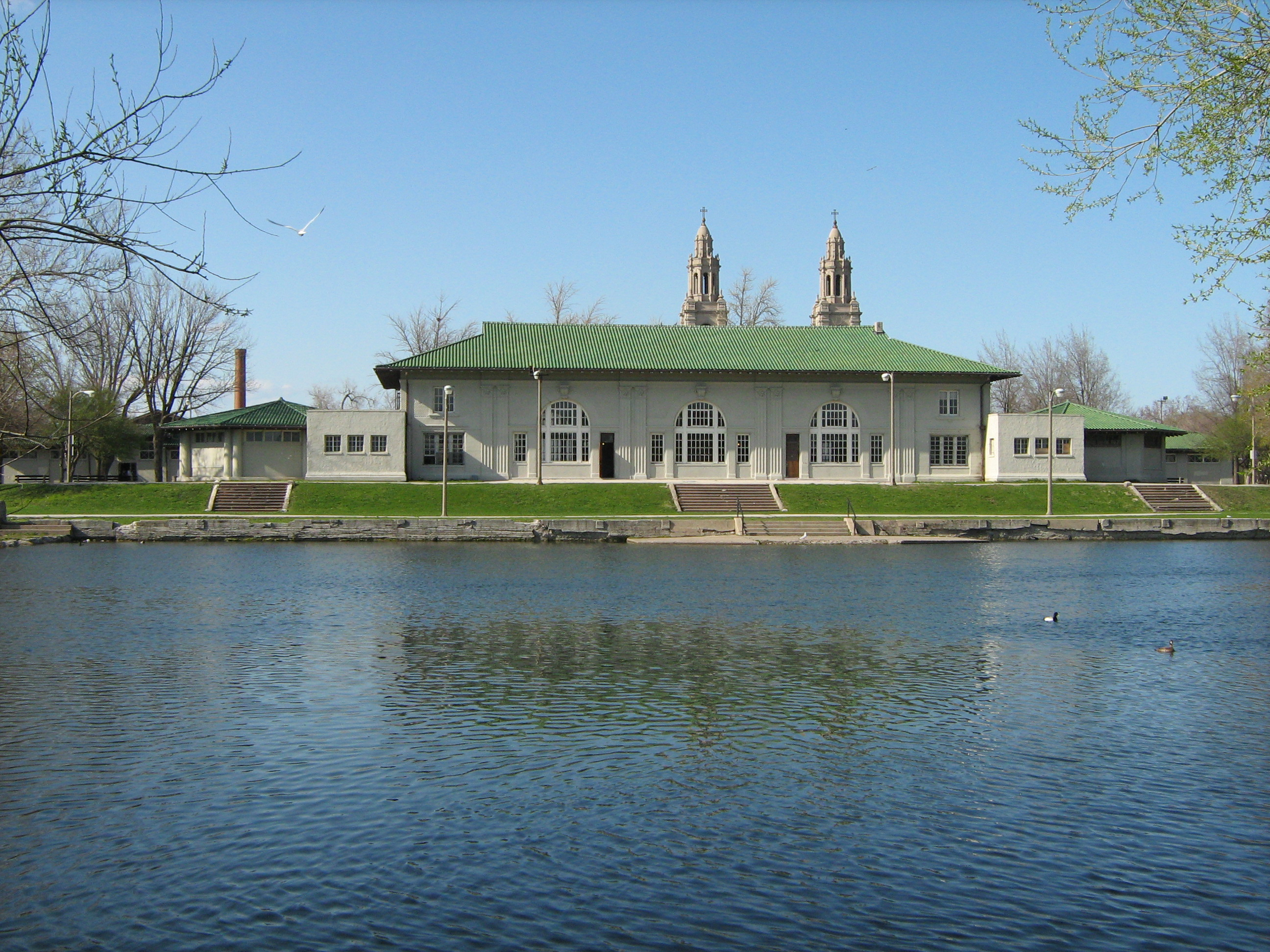
- Fieldhouse on Sherman Park
- Interactive map of Sherman Park
- Type: Urban park
- Location: Bounded by W. 52nd St., Racine Ave., Garfield Blvd., and Loomis Blvd., Chicago, Illinois
- Coordinates: 41°47′48″N 87°39′27″W
- Area: 60.6 acres (0.245 km^{2})
- Created: 1905; 121 years ago
- Operator: Chicago Park District
- Sherman Park
- U.S. National Register of Historic Places
- U.S. Historic district
- Architect: Burnham, D.H. & Co.; Olmsted Bros.
- Architectural style: Beaux Arts
- MPS: Chicago Park District MPS
- NRHP reference No.: 90000745
- Added to NRHP: May 21, 1990

Sherman Park is a 60-acre (24 ha) park in the New City neighborhood of South Side, Chicago.

It was designed by renowned landscape architects John Charles Olmsted and Frederick Law Olmsted Jr., and celebrated Chicago architect Daniel Burnham. It opened in 1905.

The park's recreational facilities include two gymnasiums, a fitness center, a swimming pool, as well as outdoor space for basketball, tennis, baseball, soccer and football.

The park was named for John B. Sherman, Burnham's father-in-law and a founder of Chicago's Union Stock Yards.

The park was designed specifically to enrich the immigrant, working class residents of the surrounding neighborhood.

== Murals ==
In 1912, eight students from the School of the Art Institute of Chicago painted murals in the Sherman Park fieldhouse that came to be known as the American History Series. These murals commemorate events such as the founding of Jamestown in 1607, the Marquette-Joliet Expedition of 1673, and George Rogers Clark's Illinois Campaign of 1778.

Over the years the murals became severely damaged due to accumulated soot and varnish. In 2004, restoration on the murals commenced with the park's inclusion in the Mural Preservation Effort, a joint project between the Chicago Park District and the Chicago Conservation Center. The restoration of the Sherman Park murals was completed in mid-2005.

== History and design ==
Sherman Park was one of ten South Side neighborhood parks designed by the Olmsted Brothers as part of an early twentieth-century reform movement to provide densely populated neighborhoods with recreational space and places for social interaction. Its landscape was organized around active recreation, with athletic fields placed on an island enclosed by a winding lagoon.
