= Charles Warrington Earle School =

- U.S. National Register of Historic Places
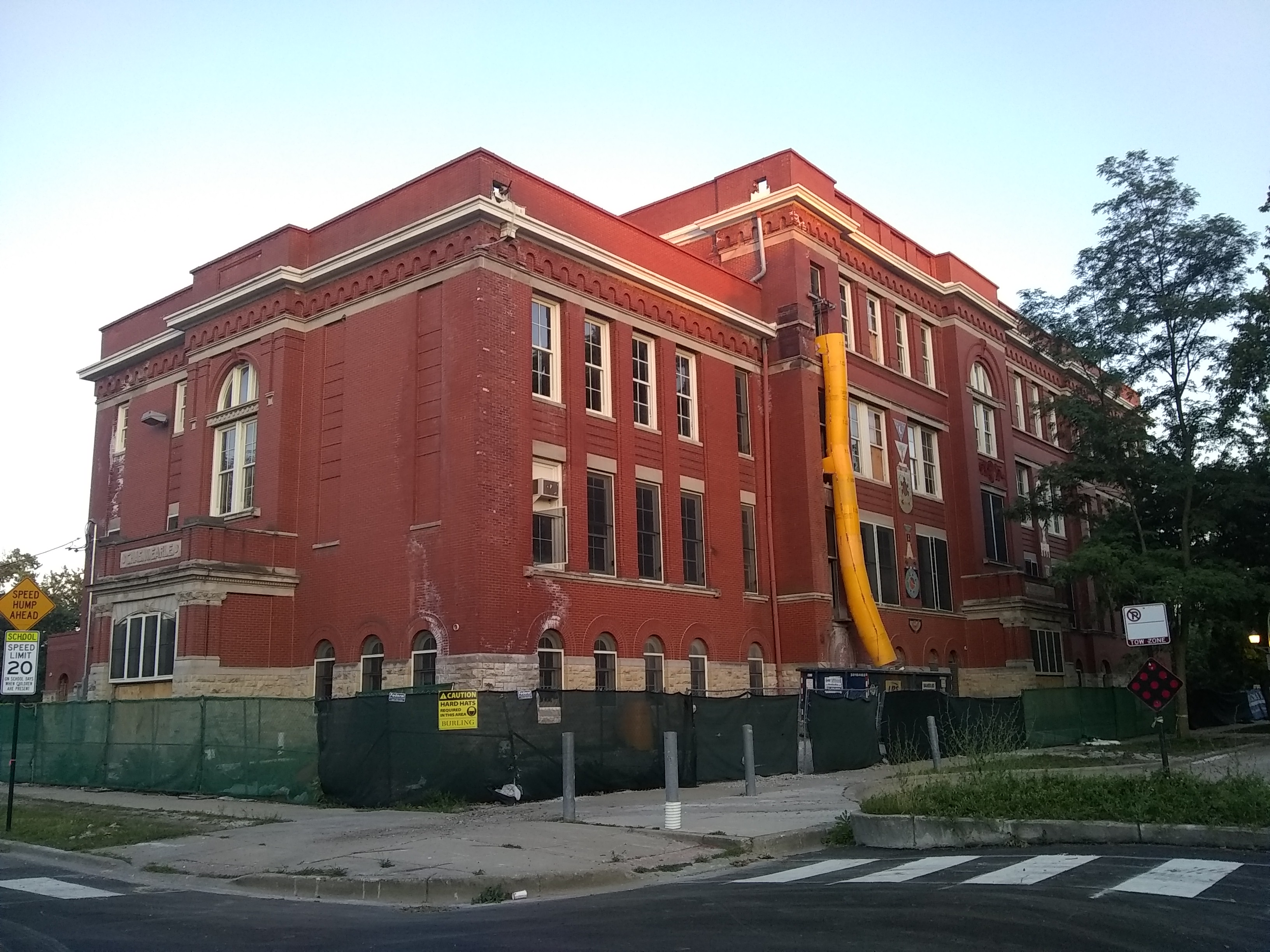

- Location within Chicago metropolitan area Location within Illinois Location within the United States
- Location: 6121 S. Hermitage Ave., Chicago, Illinois
- Coordinates: 41°46′57″N 87°40′03″W
- Built: 1897
- Architect: William August Fiedler
- Architectural style: Renaissance Revival
- NRHP reference No.: 100006227
- Added to NRHP: March 15, 2021

The Charles Warrington Earle School is a historic school building at 6121 S. Hermitage Avenue in the West Englewood neighborhood of Chicago, Illinois. Opened in 1897, the school was one of many built to serve Chicago's growing student population in the late nineteenth and early twentieth centuries, a result of compulsory education laws and an influx of European immigrants to the city. School board architect William August Fiedler designed the Renaissance Revival school; his plan was typical of Progressive Era school designs, which focused on improving the layout, lighting, and ventilation of schools. Though the school was built to serve six hundred students, settlement in West Englewood outpaced its capacity, and in 1900 the school board doubled the school's size with an addition. The school served Chicago students for over a century before closing along with over fifty other public schools in 2013.

The school was added to the National Register of Historic Places on March 15, 2021.
