= South Shore Bungalow Historic District =

- U.S. National Register of Historic Places
- U.S. Historic district
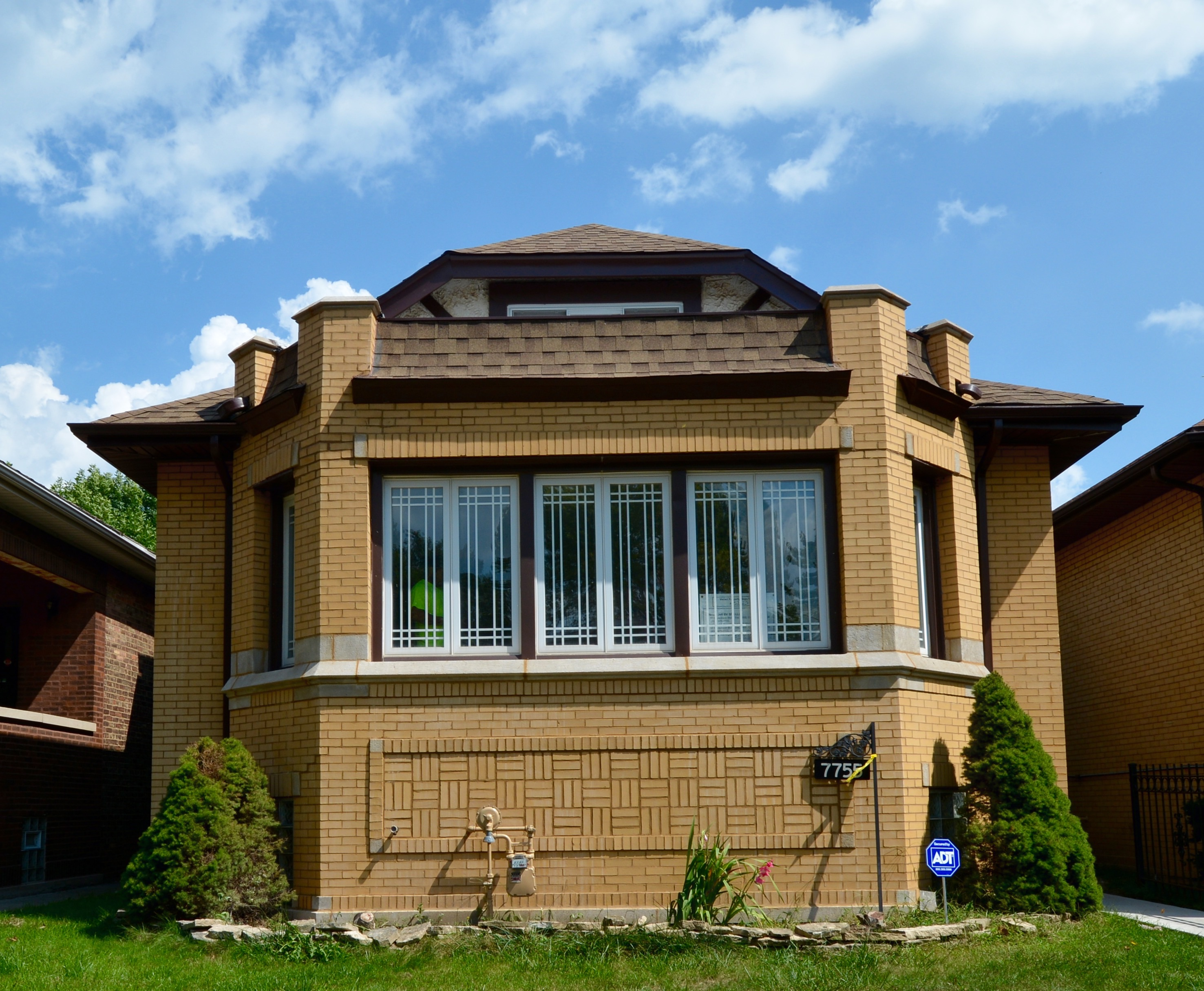

- Location within Chicago metropolitan area Location within Illinois Location within the United States
- Location: Bounded roughly by S. Crandon Ave. on the E., E. 78th St. on the S., S. Clyde Ave. on the W., E. 75th St. on the N., Chicago, Illinois
- Coordinates: 41°45′13″N 87°34′07″W
- Area: 37 acres (15 ha)
- Architectural style: Chicago Bungalow
- MPS: Chicago Bungalows MPS
- NRHP reference No.: 08001168
- Added to NRHP: December 10, 2008

The South Shore Bungalow Historic District is a residential historic district in the South Shore neighborhood of Chicago, Illinois. The district contains 229 Chicago bungalows and twenty other residential buildings built between 1911 and 1930. As homes became more accessible to families in early 20th century Chicago, thousands of bungalows were built to meet the housing demand. While bungalows were affordable mainly due to their uniform designs, their builders changed details such as color and entrance position to keep each home unique. The South Shore bungalows were among the first built in the city, as South Shore was already a popular neighborhood when the bungalow boom began, and the district contains many 1910s stucco bungalows; however, every bungalow built after 1917 is brick.

The district was added to the National Register of Historic Places on December 10, 2008.
