= Shoreline Apartments =

Apartment building in Chicago, Illinois

- U.S. National Register of Historic Places
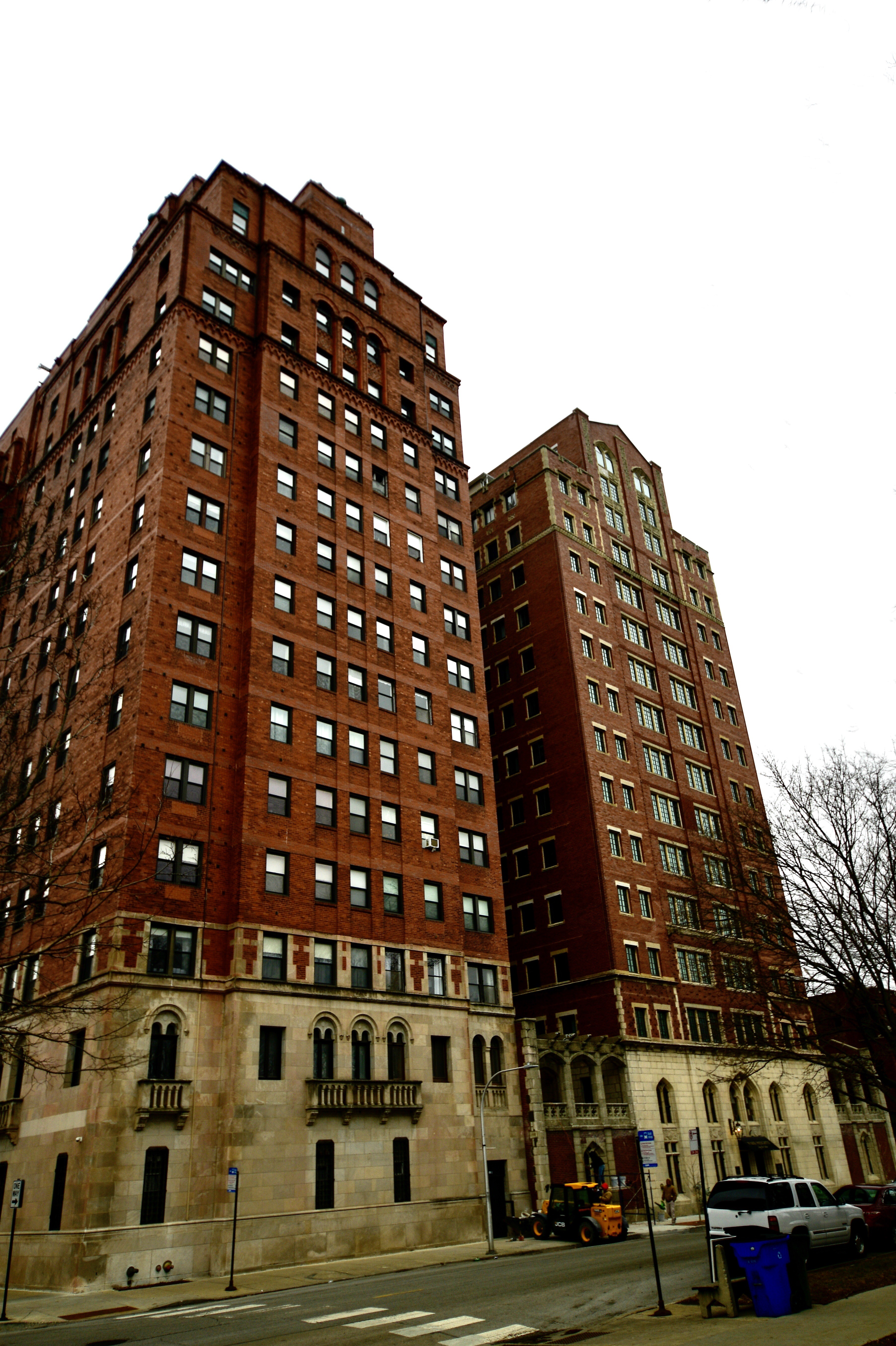

- Location within Chicago metropolitan area Location within Illinois Location within the United States
- Location: 2231 E. 67th St. Chicago, Illinois
- Coordinates: 41°46′24″N 87°34′13″W
- Built: 1928
- Architect: Henry K. Holsman
- Architectural style: Gothic Revival
- NRHP reference No.: 100001563
- Added to NRHP: September 5, 2017

The Shoreline Apartments are a historic apartment building at 2231 E. 67th Street in the South Shore neighborhood of Chicago, Illinois. Built in 1928, the sixteen-story building was one of the tallest in South Shore upon its completion. Marketed as luxury apartments, the building's units had six to seven rooms and included space for housekeepers, modern appliances, and additional amenities such as laundry service. Architect Henry K. Holsman designed the Gothic Revival building. Holsman's design features a brick exterior with a stone base, arched windows at the base and the penthouse, and stone quoins and patterned brick on the third and fourth floors. The design extends to the building's lobby, which includes decorative arches, ceiling beams, and wrought iron light fixtures.

The building was added to the National Register of Historic Places on September 5, 2017.
