= Davis Square (Chicago) =

- U.S. National Register of Historic Places
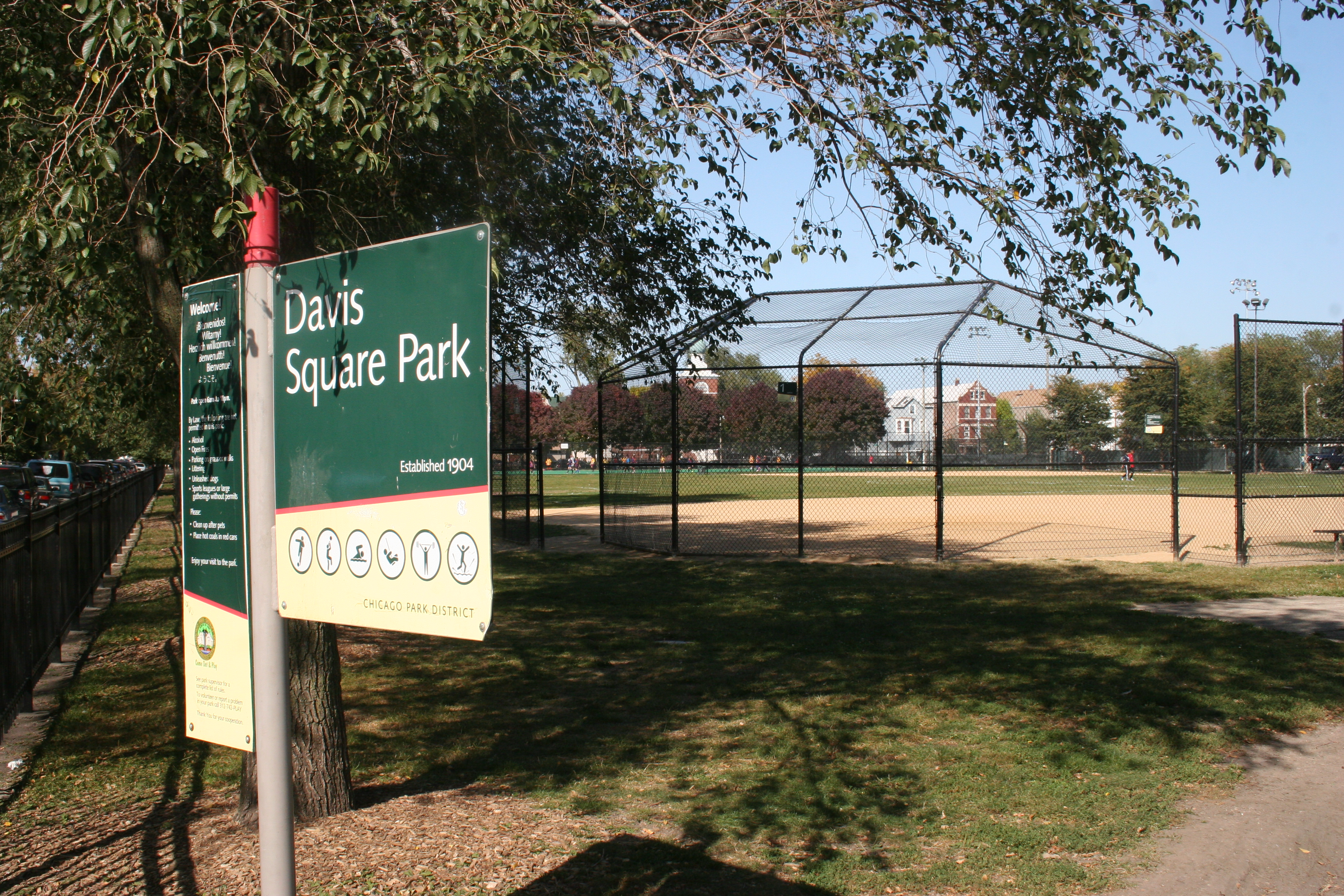

- Location within Chicago metropolitan area Location within Illinois Location within the United States
- Location: Roughly bounded by W. 44th St., W. 45th St., S. Marshfield Ave. and S. Hermitage Ave., Chicago, Illinois
- Coordinates: 41°48′47″N 87°40′03″W
- Area: 8.3 acres (3.4 ha)
- Architect: D. H. Burnham & Co.; Olmsted Brothers
- Architectural style: Beaux Arts
- MPS: Chicago Park District MPS
- NRHP reference No.: 03000787
- Added to NRHP: August 18, 2003

Davis Square is a public park located between 44th and 45th Streets and Marshfield and Hermitage Avenues in the New City community area of Chicago, Illinois. The park opened in 1905 as one of the initial parks in the South Park Commission's plan to build parks in the dense, poor neighborhoods of Chicago's South Side. It was named for Nathan Smith Davis, a Chicago physician and one of the founders of the American Medical Association. As they did for most of the South Park Commission's parks, the Olmsted Brothers designed Davis Square's landscape, while D. H. Burnham and Company designed its facilities. The park initially included a Beaux-Arts styled fieldhouse, a swimming pool and pool house, baseball fields, and walking paths.

The park was added to the National Register of Historic Places on August 18, 2003.
