= Robert S. Abbott House =

Historic house in Chicago, Illinois

- U.S. National Register of Historic Places
- U.S. National Historic Landmark
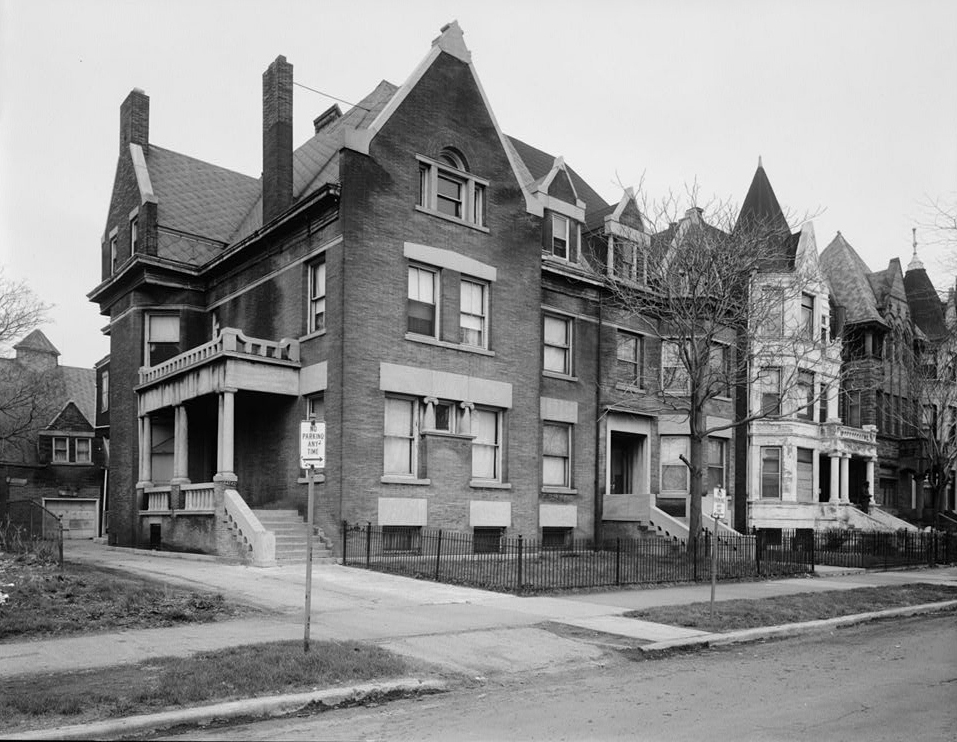
- Robert S. Abbott House

- Location within Illinois Location within the United States
- Location: 4742 South Dr. Martin Luther King Jr. Drive, Chicago, IL
- Coordinates: 41°48′28.9″N 87°37′1.4″W
- Built: c. 1900
- Architectural style: Queen Anne
- NRHP reference No.: 76000686

Significant dates
- Added to NRHP: December 8, 1976
- Designated NHL: December 08, 1976

The Robert S. Abbott House is a historic house in the Grand Boulevard community area of Chicago, Illinois.

Built in 1900, it was the home of Robert S. Abbott, founder and publisher of the Chicago Defender, the most-circulated African-American newspaper in the nation, from 1926 up until his death in 1940. His home was designated a National Historic Landmark status in 1976.

== Description and history ==
The Robert S. Abbott House stands on Chicago's South Side, north of Washington Park on the west side of Martin Luther King Jr. Boulevard, and on the same block as the Harold Washington Cultural Center on the east side.

It stands at the southern end of a group of row houses, and is the left side of an asymmetrical duplex. Its construction date is unknown, but is estimated to be about 1900 based on its architectural style, which is a combination of Late Victorian and Neo-Classical elements.

The combined units share a hip roof, with that on the left featuring a large projecting gabled section two bays in width. To its right, a single bay set next to the entrance to the adjacent unit, while the on its left, the unit's entrance is sheltered under a separate side porch. The interior, which has been further broken up into separate living units, retains some of its original elements.

== See also ==
- List of National Historic Landmarks in Illinois
- National Register of Historic Places listings in South Side Chicago
