= Z. Erol Smith =

Architect in Chicago

Z. Erol Smith Sr. (died September 1964) was an American architect in Chicago. He designed buildings for Anthony Overton including the Overton Hygienic Building and the Chicago Bee Building for the Chicago Bee newspaper. His son of the same name served as the first mayor of Palos Heights and continued in office for 14 years.

He established his architecture business in 1915. His office was at 5501 South Prairie, 343 East Garfield Boulevard and 305 East 55th Street.

He trained at the Armour Institute of Technology and Art Institute of Technology. Much of his work is in Chicago's south side.

In 1919, he designed a couple of garages. In 1922, he designed to Overton Hygienic Building at 3627 South State Street.

The Chicago Bee Building at 3647 South State Street was built from 1929 to 1931. It was built as the headquarters for the Chicago Bee. It later also served as offices for his skin care products business and eventually as a public library. It is in the Black Metropolis-Bronzeville Historic District. In 1998, it was listed as a Chicago Landmark.

His namesake son was mayor of Palos Heights. His grandson Z. Erol Smith is an architect.

== Work ==
- Overton Hygienic Building (1922)
- West Lawn State Bank (1926)
- Anderson Building
- Chicago Bee Building (1929 -1931)
- Grand Boulevard and 35th St. building
- Theater at 75th Street and Essex Avenue
- Shore Theatre (1927), South Shore Theater 75th and Kingston streets
- 5025 Woodlawn Avenue
- Streetsville Hotel Company hotel at Chestnut Street and Dewitt Place
