= Arthur J. Wilson =

Accountant from Illinois

Arthur Jewell Wilson
- Occupation: Accountant
- Known for: First Black CPA in Illinois

Arthur J. Wilson was an American Certified Public Accountant (CPA) who was the second Black CPA in the United States and the first in Illinois. He was influential integrating the accounting profession in the United States.

== Biography ==
Arthur Jewell Wilson was the son of Maynard Wilson, who served as secretary to the mayor of Omaha, Nebraska for nearly 20 years. He graduated from the University of Illinois, where he was a member of Alpha Phi Alpha, and then went to work for Hygienic Manufacturing Company, where his interest in business was cultivated by Anthony Overton. He later obtained employment as a cashier at Binga State Bank and, in 1923 qualified for his CPA license, becoming the second Black CPA in the United States and the first in Illinois.

Because most states required work experience in accounting prior to licensing, many Black accountants reported difficulty in meeting the requirements due to trouble finding employment with a white-owned CPA firm. Wilson was able to obtain licensure due, in part, to the fact that the state of Illinois had not yet enacted legislation requiring apprenticeship to become a CPA. He, in turn, mentored other aspiring Black CPAs and, by 1945, half of all Black CPAs in the United States worked in the Chicago area. He has been credited as the mentor to Mary T. Washington.

Wilson eventually went on to serve as Vice-President of Binga State Bank.

Wilson's son, Arthur Jewell Wilson, Jr., was a standout basketball player at Princeton University and later chief of police of East St. Louis, Illinois.
