= Olive Diggs =

American journalist

Olive Myrl Diggs (April 22, 1908 - November 10, 1980) was the managing editor of Anthony Overton's Chicago Bee from 1929 until it closed in 1947, a public official advocating for Chicago's African American community, and a city planner.

She was born in Mound City, Illinois, received a B.S. in Economics and Accounting from Northwestern University and an M.S. from Roosevelt University.

At the Chicago Bee, Diggs focused on housing for African-Americans in Chicago and advocated for neighborhood rejuvenation. She directed the Neighborhood Youth Corps and was a consultant for the National Youth Administration.

She served as Assistant Direct of the Illinois Commission on Human Relations. She gave speeches. She retired as Administrative Assistant in the Chicago Department of Planning, City and Community Development in 1979.
