= Anthony Overton Elementary School =

- U.S. National Register of Historic Places
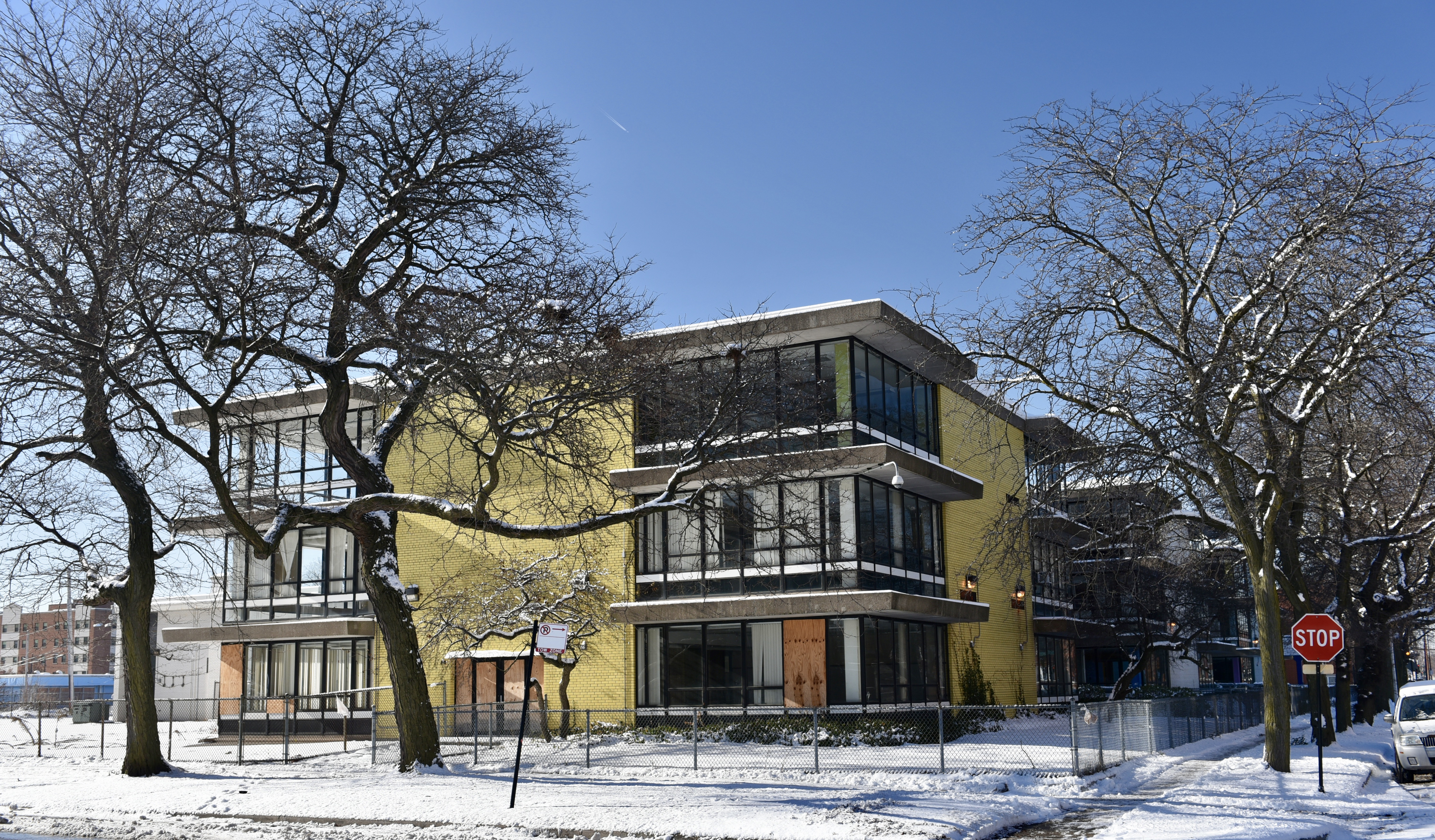

- Location within Chicago metropolitan area Location within Illinois Location within the United States
- Location: 221 E. 49th St., Chicago, Illinois
- Coordinates: 41°48′20″N 87°37′14″W
- Built: 1963
- Architect: Perkins & Will
- Architectural style: Mid-Century Modern
- NRHP reference No.: 16000578
- Added to NRHP: September 6, 2016

The Anthony Overton Elementary School is a historic school building at 221 E. 49th Street in the Grand Boulevard community of Chicago, Illinois. The building is in the process of being turned into a community arts center by the Emerald South Economic Development Collaborative.

== History ==
Built in 1963, the school was one of three prototype schools designed to relieve overcrowding in poor, majority black neighborhoods; it mainly served students from the nearby Robert Taylor Homes housing project. The school was named for Anthony Overton, a black business leader and founder of the Chicago Bee. The school served students until 2013, when it was closed as part of wave of public school closings in Chicago.

== Architecture ==
Architects Perkins & Will designed the school in the mid-century modern style, which was chosen as a departure from institutional school buildings. The school was divided into three three-story sections to avoid the dominating impression of a single building; each section included large corner windows shaded by canopies and used colorful yellow brick to stand out from surrounding buildings. The building was added to the National Register of Historic Places on September 6, 2016.
