= Chicago Bee =

Newspaper in Chicago, Illinois

The Chicago Bee
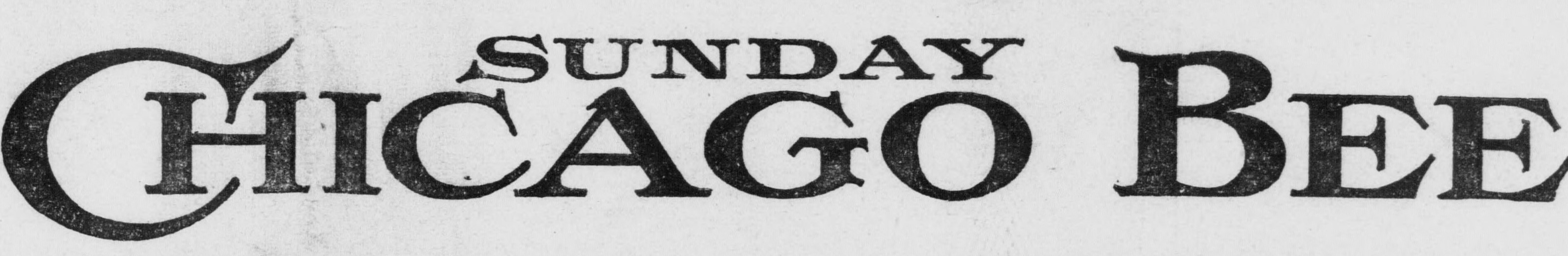
- The Chicago Bee Header
- Type: Weekly newspaper
- Format: Broadsheet, later Tabloid
- Owner: Anthony Overton
- Founded: 1925
- Ceased publication: 1947
- Language: English
- Headquarters: Chicago Bee Building, 3647 S. State Street, Chicago

The Chicago Bee or Chicago Sunday Bee was a Chicago-based weekly newspaper founded by Anthony Overton, an African American, in 1925. Its readership was primarily African American and the paper was committed to covering "wholesome and authentic news", and adopted a middle-class, conservative tone. Politically, it was aligned with the Republican Party. Overton established Half-Century Magazine in 1916 and it was published until 1947.

== History ==
The Chicago Bee was founded by Anthony Overton in 1925. Overton was a wealthy industrialist, owning such concerns as the Overton Hygienic Company, a cosmetics firm. He had also made a previous venture in publishing, in the form of the Half Century Magazine.

After sharing quarters with the Hygienic Company in the 1920s, the Bee moved into the new Chicago Bee Building, an Art Deco structure built between 1929 and 1931. However, after Overton's bank failed in the 1930s, the two businesses shared quarters once again, as the Hygienic Company moved into the Bee building.

Chandler Owen became editor of the Bee after moving to Chicago. The Bee initially supported the Brotherhood of Sleeping Car Porters, which Owen supported, but later joined other publications including the Chicago Defender in opposing the union.

Subsequent editors of the paper included Ida B. Wells and Olive Diggs. The Bee's editorial staff was mostly female, and the newspaper covered the black women's club movement extensively. It distinguished itself from other newspapers in the Chicago black press in its promotion of black history and literature.

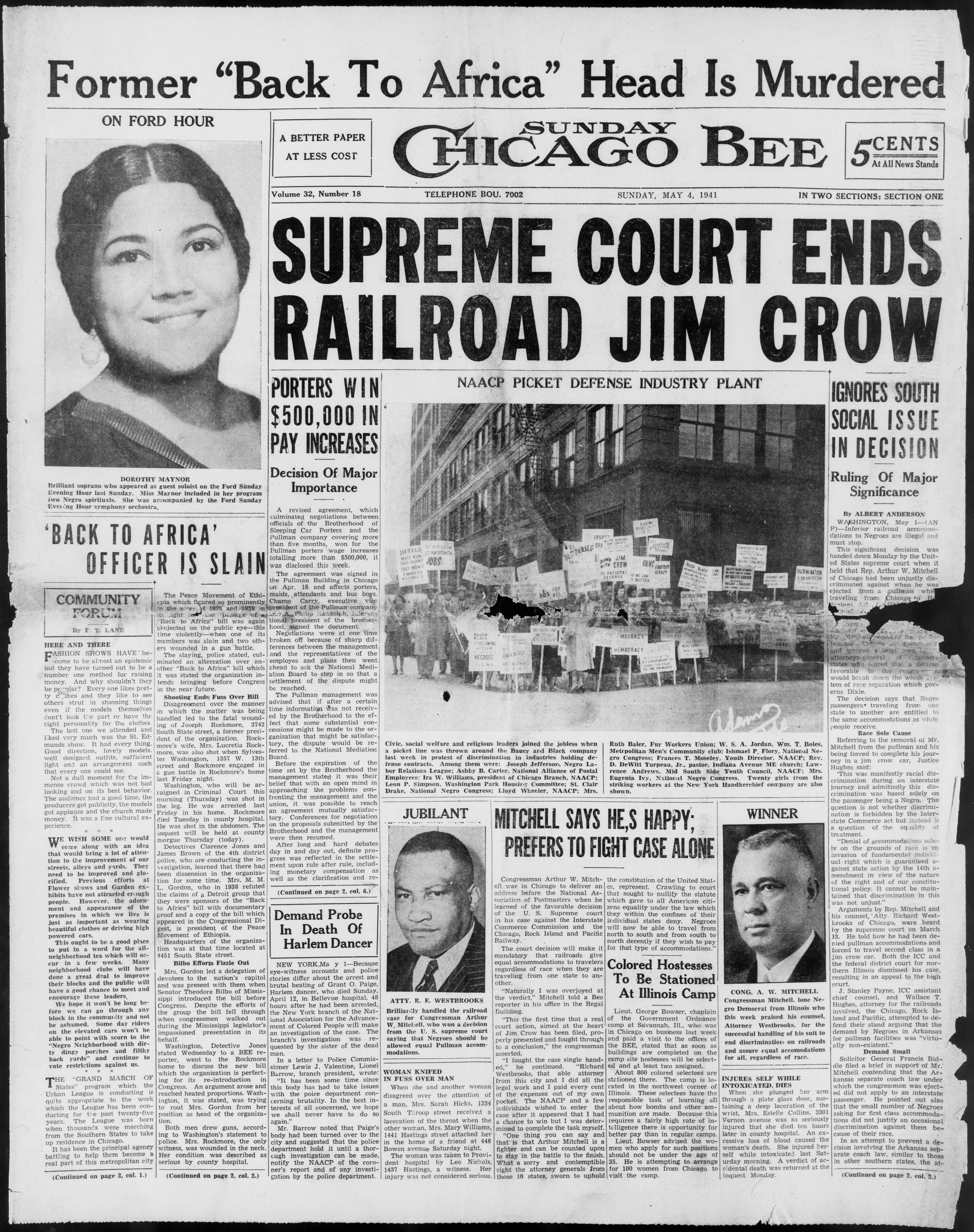
Chicago Bee monthly front page, May 4, 1941

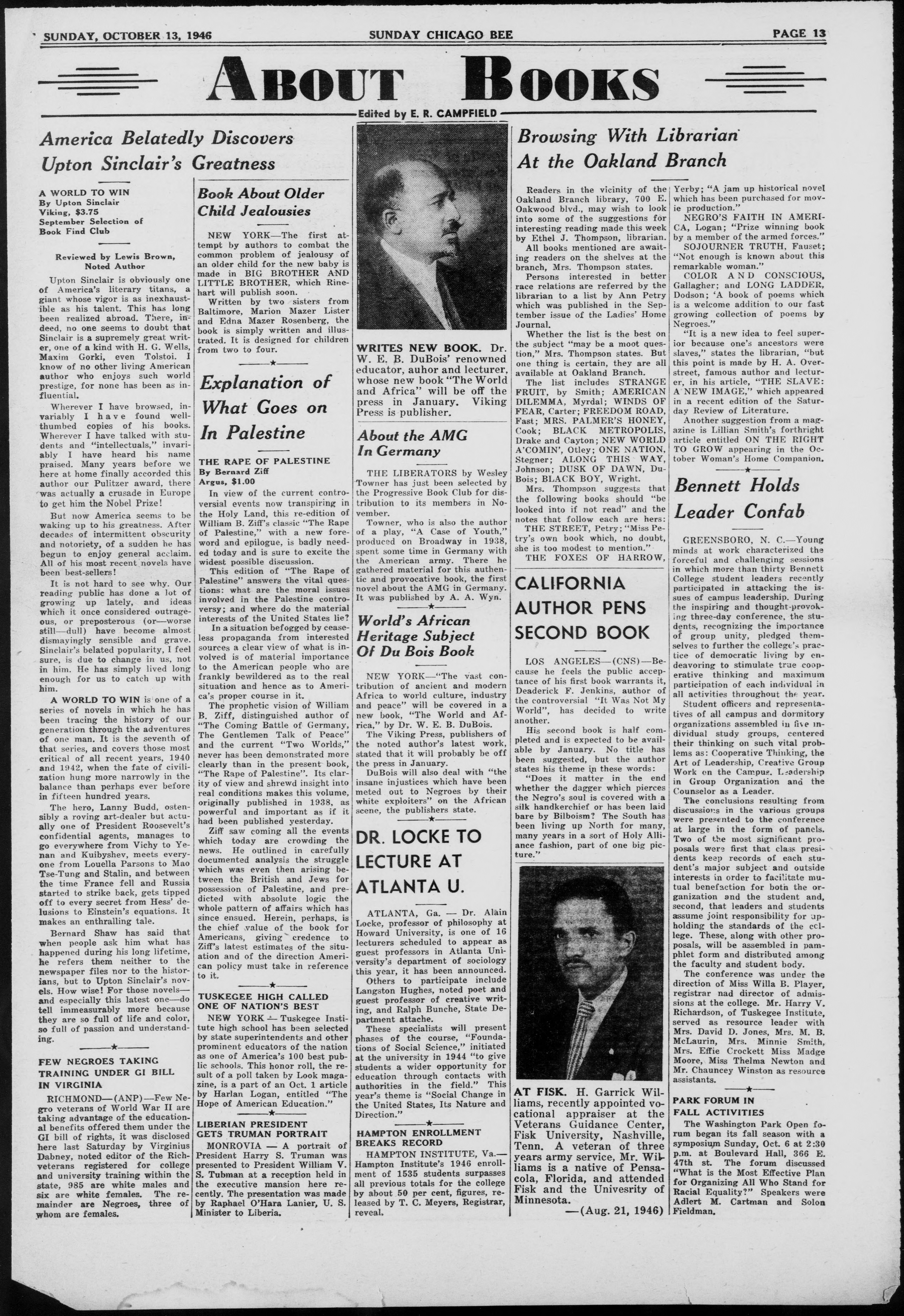
The Chicago Sunday Bee About Books

The Bee sponsored the original "Mayor of Bronzeville" contest which led to the use of the term "Bronzeville" for the neighborhood. The concept was originally suggested by theater editor James Gentry, who coined the term and had been sponsoring a beauty contest in the neighborhood since 1916. When Gentry left the paper in 1932, he took his concept with him to the Chicago Defender, which continued the contests.

After Overton's death in 1946, the Bee was briefly continued by his sons in a tabloid format, but was unsuccessful. It ceased publication in 1947.

Very little of the Bee survives today, apart from the building it occupied. One historian was unable to find a single intact issue from the years 1925 to 1935.

== Works cited ==
- Bates, Beth Tompkins (2001). Pullman Porters and the Rise of Protest Politics in Black America, 1925-1945. ISBN 0807875368.
- Capozolla, Christopher (2004). "Owen, Chandler". Encyclopedia of the Harlem Renaissance: K-Y. ISBN 1579584586.
- Grant, Carl A.; Grant, Shelby J. (2013). The Moment: Barack Obama, Jeremiah Wright, and the Firestorm at Trinity United Church of Christ. ISBN 978-1442219977.
- Ingham, John N.; Feldman, Lynne B. (1994). "Overton, Anthony". African-American Business Leaders: A Biographical Dictionary. ISBN 0313272530.
- Knupfer, Anne Meis (2006). The Chicago Black Renaissance and Women's Activism. ISBN 0252072936.
- Mahoney, Olivia (2001). Douglas/Grand Boulevard: A Chicago Neighborhood. ISBN 0738518557.
- Reed, Christopher Robert (2011). The Rise of Chicago's Black Metropolis, 1920-1929. ISBN 978-0252093173.
- Savage, Beth L. (1994). African American Historic Places. ISBN 0471143456.
- Schlabach, Elizabeth (2013). Along the Streets of Bronzeville: Black Chicago's Literary Landscape.
- Trodd, Zoe (2011). "The Black Press and the Black Chicago Renaissance". In Tracy, Steven C. (ed.). Writers of the Black Chicago Renaissance. ISBN 978-0252093425.
- West, Sandra L. (2003). "Chicago". Encyclopedia of the Harlem Renaissance. ISBN 1438130171.
