= Chicago Bee Building =

- U.S. National Register of Historic Places
- Chicago Landmark
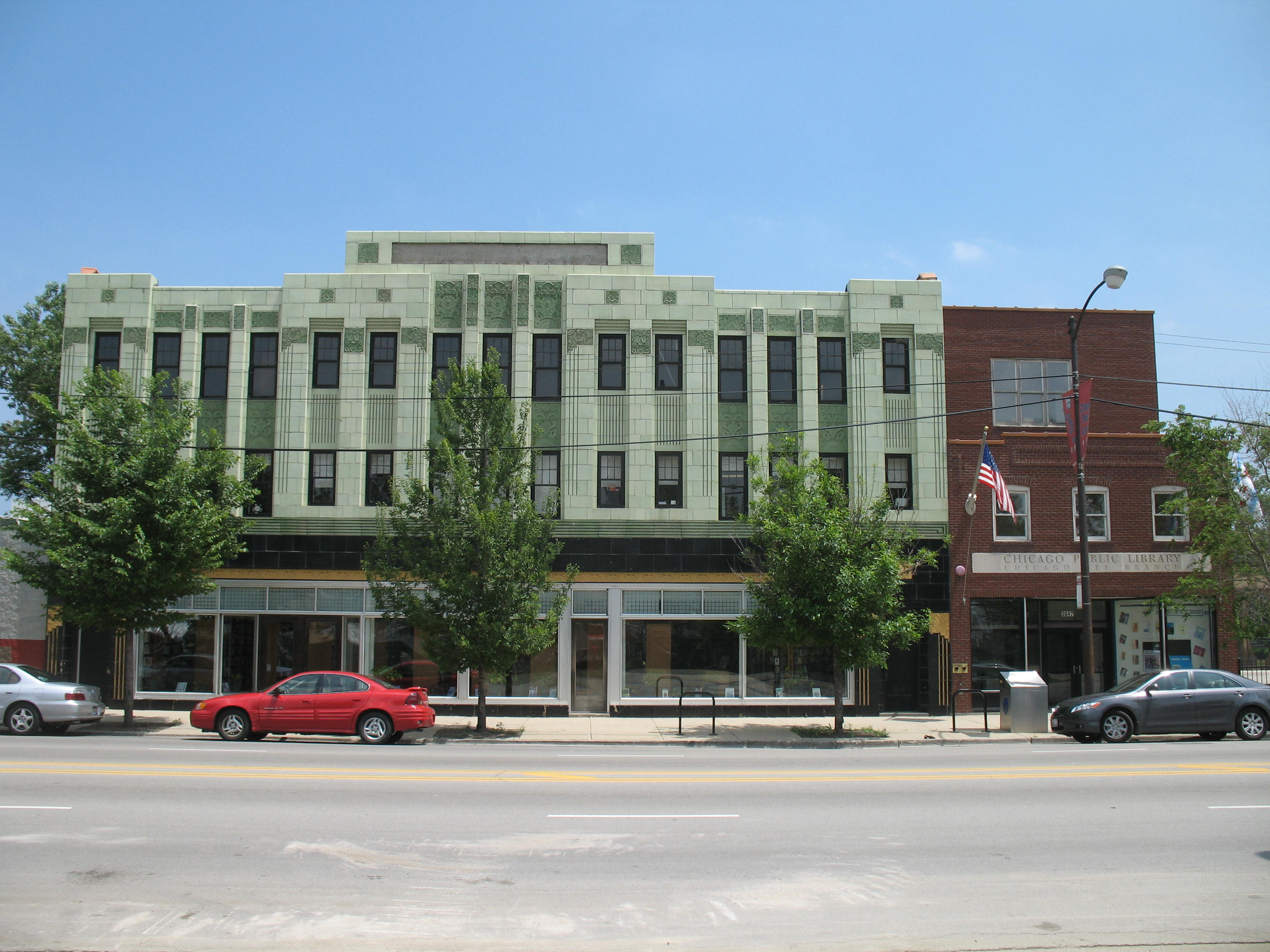

- Location within Chicago Location within Illinois Location within the United States
- Location: 3647-55 S. State St. Chicago, IL
- Coordinates: 41°49′40.94″N 87°37′34.26″W
- Built: 1929
- Architect: Z. Erol Smith
- Architectural style: Art Deco
- MPS: Black Metropolis TR
- NRHP reference No.: 86001090

Significant dates
- Added to NRHP: April 30, 1986
- Designated CHICL: September 9, 1998

The Chicago Bee Building is a historic building on Chicago's South Side. It originally housed the Chicago Bee, a newspaper serving the African Americans of Chicago. The building now houses the Chicago Bee Branch of the Chicago Public Library. The building was named a Chicago Landmark on September 9, 1998. It is located in the Black Metropolis-Bronzeville District in the Douglas community area of Chicago, Illinois.

The Chicago Bee was founded by the African American entrepreneur Anthony Overton in 1926. This building was Overton's affirmation of his confidence in the viability of the State Street Commercial district. This three-story building was one of the most picturesque in the district, and the one designed in the Art Deco style of the 1920s. All of Overton's enterprises shared this building until the early 1940s when the newspaper went out of business. The cosmetics firm continued to occupy the building until the early 1980s. The City of Chicago purchased the building and it is now a Chicago Public Library. It originally had upper-floor apartments. It also housed the offices of the Douglass National Bank and the Overton Hygienic Company, during the 1930s. The Overton Hygienic Company was nationally known as a cosmetics firm.

Overton Hygienic went out of business in the early 1980s. In the mid-1990s, the building was reused as a branch of the Chicago Public Library. It is one of nine structures in the Black Metropolis-Bronzeville Historic District. It was added to the National Register of Historic Places on April 30, 1986.

== Gallery ==
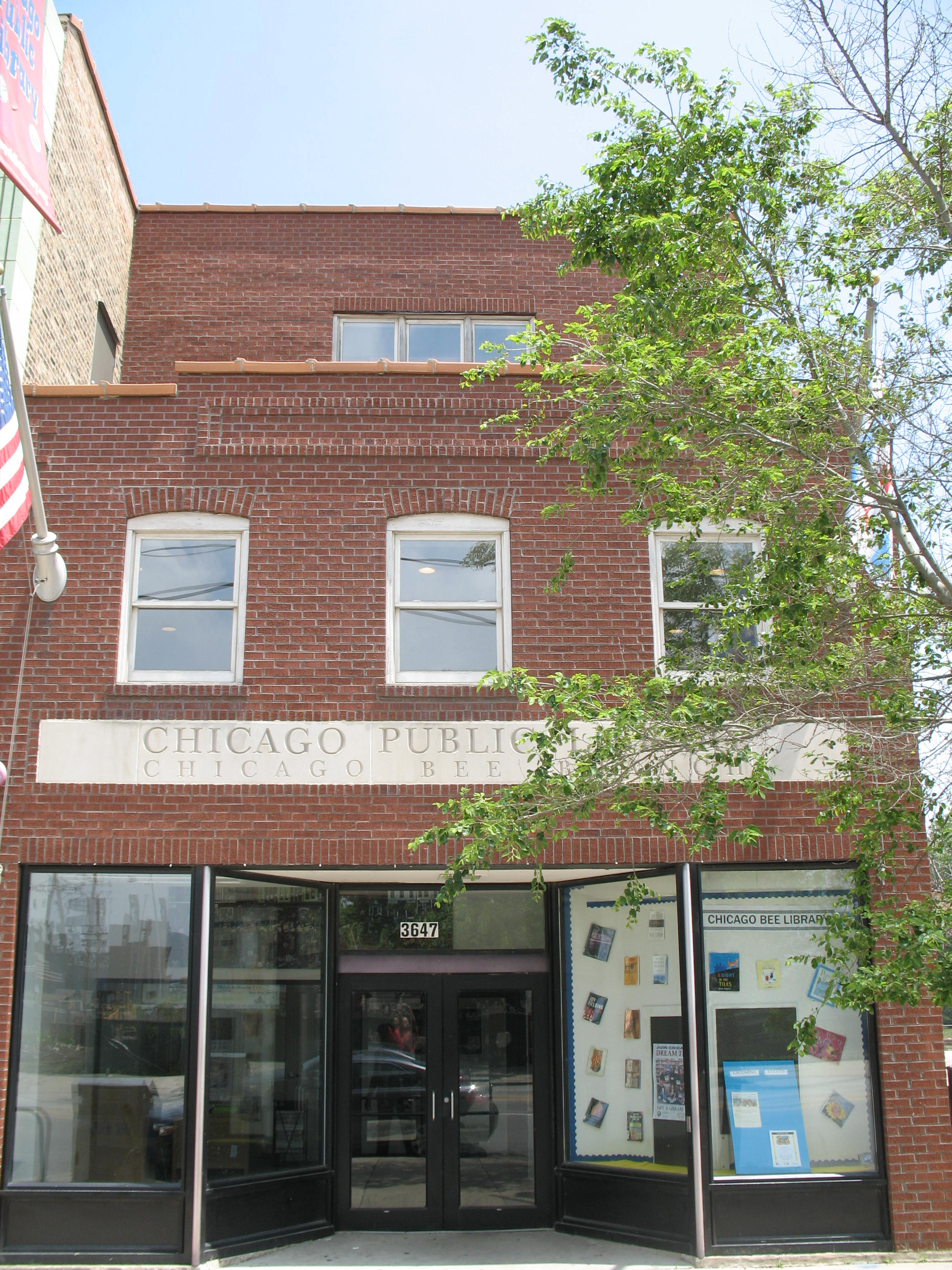

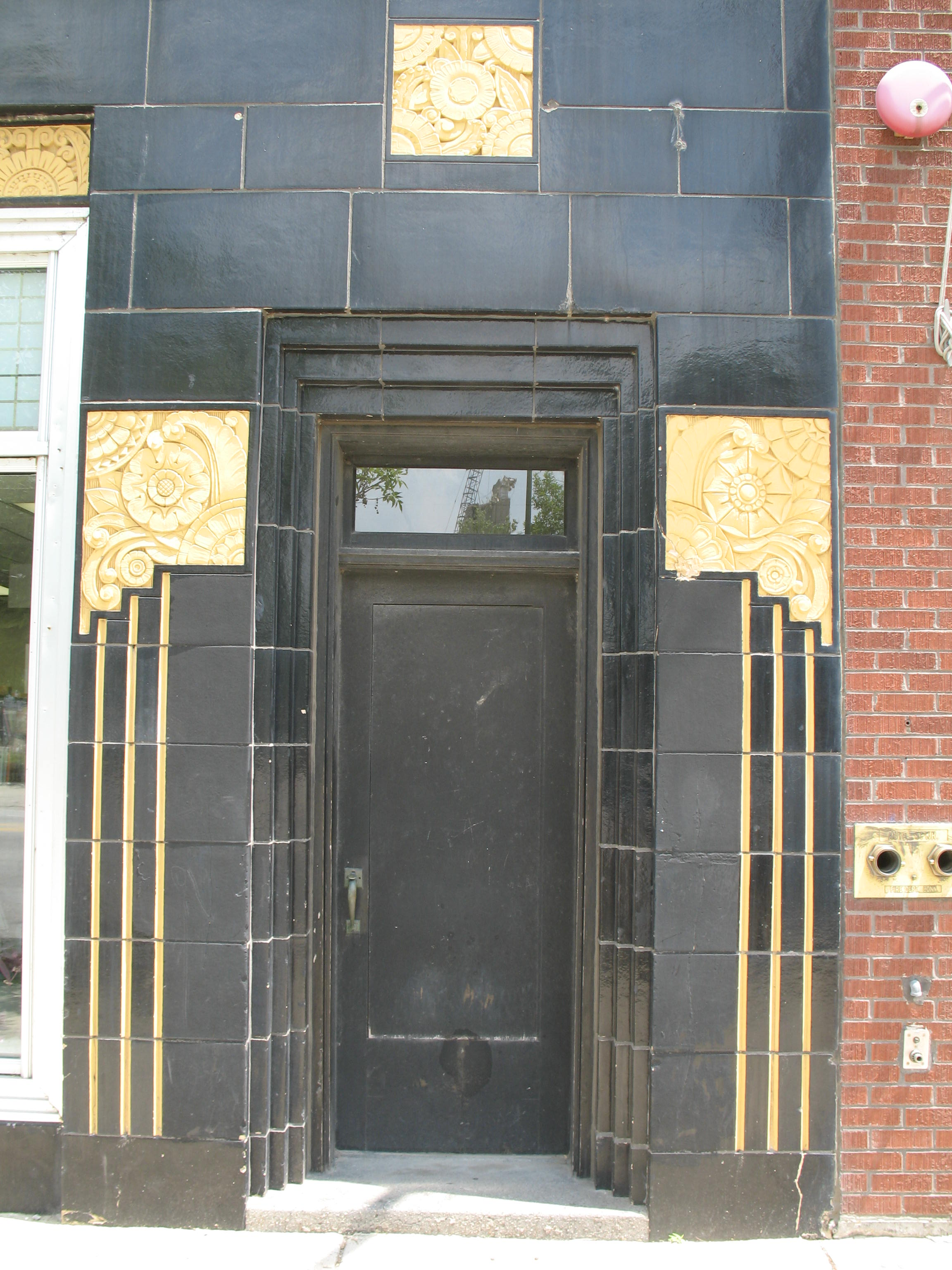

== Notes ==
- Chicago Bee Building, Tour Black Chicago
