= Wabash Avenue YMCA =

Historic place in Chicago, Illinois, United States

- U.S. National Register of Historic Places
- U.S. Historic district – Contributing property
- Chicago Landmark
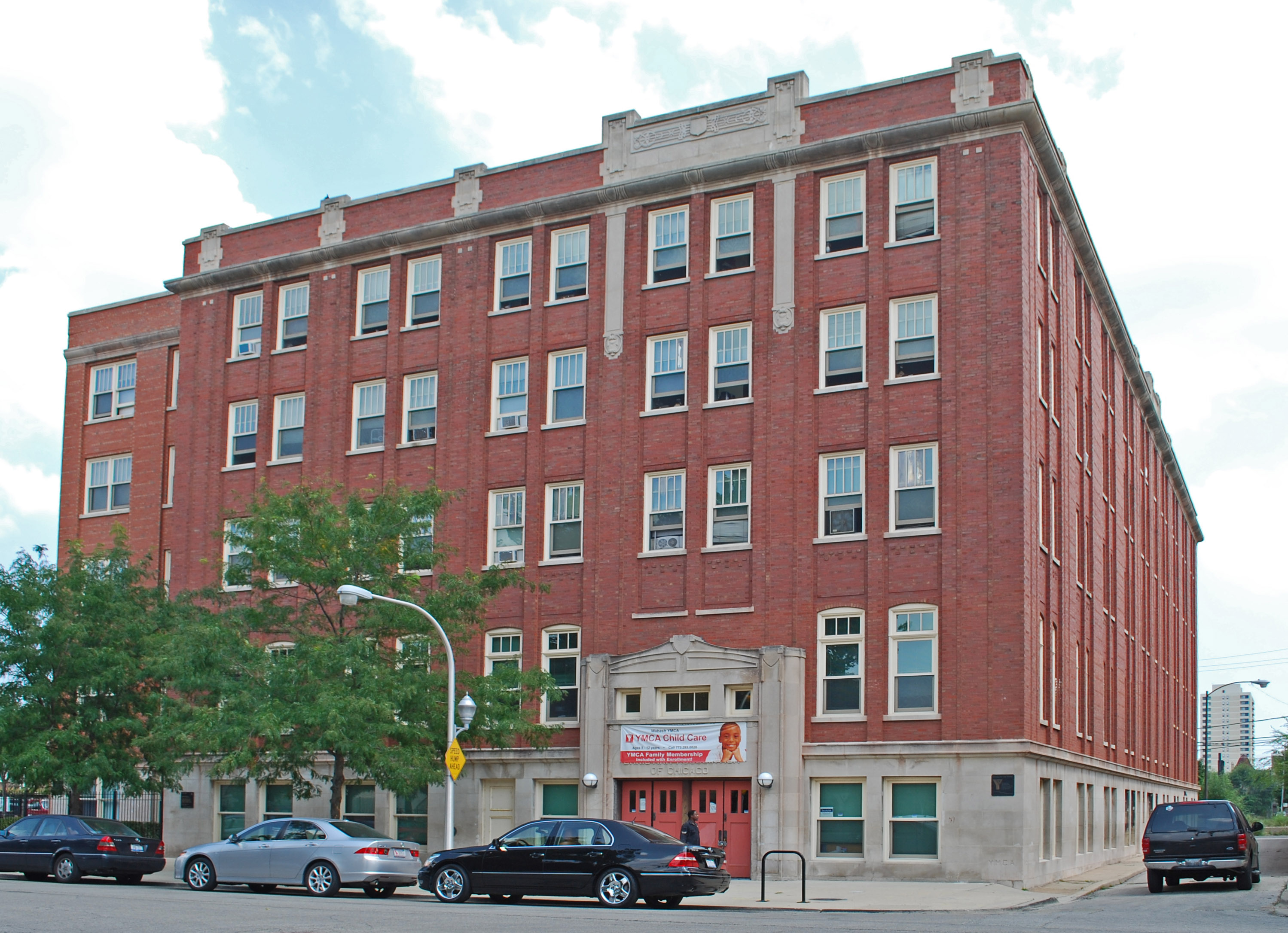

- Location within Illinois
- Location: 3763 S. Wabash Ave. Chicago, Illinois
- Coordinates: 41°49′33″N 87°37′29″W
- Built: 1911
- Architect: Berlin, Robert C.
- MPS: Black Metropolis TR
- NRHP reference No.: 86001095

Significant dates
- Added to NRHP: April 30, 1986
- Designated CHICL: September 9, 1998

Wabash Avenue YMCA is a Chicago Landmark located within the Chicago Landmark Black Metropolis-Bronzeville Historic District in the Douglas community area of Chicago, Illinois. This YMCA facility served as an important social center within the Black Metropolis area, and it also provided housing and job training for African Americans migrating into Chicago in the early 20th century. In 1915, the Association for the Study of Negro Life and History, one of the first groups specializing in African-American studies, was founded during a meeting at the Wabash 'Y'.

Louis Gregory, a traveling speaker for the Bahá'í Faith and often attending national conventions of the religion held in Chicago area, is known to have stayed there in the spring of 1918 and gave talks to clubs while in town. Black contralto Marian Anderson gave one of her early performances here in 1919.

The Black Metropolis area in Chicago, centered on the area of 35th Street and State Street, was a city within a city developed by the black community as an alternative to the restrictions, exploitations, and indifference of the city at large. Wabash Avenue YMCA was opened in 1914, supported by Julius Rosenwald, president of Sears, Roebuck and Company at the time. Rosenwald had a philanthropic interest in black-oriented causes. YMCA provided job training programs such as auto repair and manual training. The Black Metropolis district thrived through the 1920s, but competition from white-owned businesses on 47th Street and the effects of the Great Depression led to the closure of many of the black-owned businesses. Declining membership and deterioration of the building led to its closing in 1981. In the late 1990s, however, a nine-million dollar renovation project was undertaken by The Renaissance Collaborative to return to the building to its rightful condition.

It was listed on the U.S. National Register of Historic Places in 1986.
