= Beauty pageants in the Black diaspora =

Black beauty pageants are competitions, created within Black communities to celebrate racial pride, inclusion, and cultural acceptance, while showcasing the beauty and achievements of Black women. Largely created in response to the historical exclusion of Black women from international pageantry, Black communities in the United States and Caribbean established their own pageant organizations.

The earliest recorded national Black pageant originates from Half-Century magazine's 1921 contest under the name, "Who Is the Prettiest Colored Girl in the United States?", with competitors across the segregated United States registering, regarded as a foundational challenge to racial stereotypes towards Black women.

Beyond competitions, Black pageantry cultivated diasporic connections between the US and regions within the Caribbean, functioning as a uniting force in their shared culture. Black beauty pageants exist today as an undercurrent of political and cultural solidarity within Black communities.

== Historical background ==
Beauty pageants, since their origin have operated along racial lines, in part due to the twentieth century's original Jim Crow segregation laws. Jim Crow laws operated as a governmental system of segregation across the entire southern United States, preventing American Black women from entering mainstream beauty competitions. Beyond the US, euro-centric beauty standards impeded pageantry throughout the Caribbean, highly restricting Black representation. In response, Black communities created their own beauty pageants, publicly celebrating Black women.

Some of the earliest competitions were organized through African American newspapers, posting an open call for all interested Black women to compete as a demonstration of racial solidarity amongst Black women. The Half-Century magazine in 1921 conducted a national pageant titled "Who Is the Prettiest Colored Girl in the United States?", comprising women from Texas, Georgia, and Mississippi. The pageant existed as a defiance against widespread racist assumptions about Black women's beauty.

Later in 1925, Memphis Tennessee's Madame Mamie Hightower of the Golden Brown Chemical Company, sponsored the first recorded Black beauty pageant following the establishment of Jim Crow laws, consisting of over 1,400 contestants.

Beyond the United States, Black pageants throughout the Caribbean emerged simultaneously, with these competitions developing in response to similar histories of racial exclusion and stereotypes against Black women. Women like Gerthie David, winner of Ms. Haiti 1975, specifically used her platform through her pageant to build connections with the United States. She used her pageant winnings to travel to Chicago, and introduced her Haitian culture to American audiences for the purposes of combatting distortions and stereotypes of Haitian people in American media.

== Political advocacy ==
Black Beauty Pageants often operated as political grounds for organizing within Black communities. Black pageant organizations often held advocacy meetings in community spaces separate from the competitive environment, such as black-owned hair salons and beauty schools, to organize as a political collective. During the Jim Crow era particularly, salon owners, where these meetings took place in the US, often also took the role of organizing and mobilizing Black women in Black Pageantry to vocalize civil rights issues affecting the Black public.

Outside of the US, Caribbean pageant organizations similarly presented the competitions as opportunities for both Black contestants and community members alike to take a stand against racial prejudice. These pageants used their platform as a public reclamation of beauty standards, framing Black women as figures of admiration and recognition. A 1955 Jamaican pageant titled, "Ten Types, One People" was held a symbolic 300 years after the British colonization of Jamaica. In this pageant, ten women competed, all ranging in skin tones to represent Black beauty as a stand against past colonization.

Gerthie David, Miss Haiti 1975, used her public platform and stardom as a political gateway to reach the American public, with the goal of reshaping perceptions across the Black diaspora, and attempting to reroute perceptions on Haitian women and people. David's political messaging reflects a larger diasporic movement in the Black Pageant scene, with US and Caribbean pageant spaces creating a political solidarity across the diaspora that connects to present day activism.

== Internal exclusions ==
Black beauty pageants, while holding their own publicly regarded space for Black Women, restricted competitors to fit to a number of standards that better aligned with media expectations. Pageant organizations often expected specific speech patterns and appearance thresholds for entry, demonstrating cases of colorism, along with class and educational evaluations before allowing participation. For example, Jamaica's "Ten Types, One People" pageant, while presenting itself as representing a range of skin tones in Jamaican women, only allowed two categories of which dark-skinned women represented them. The remaining eight categories defaulted to showcasing Black women with lighter skin complexions, six of which containing mixed heritage Jamaican women.

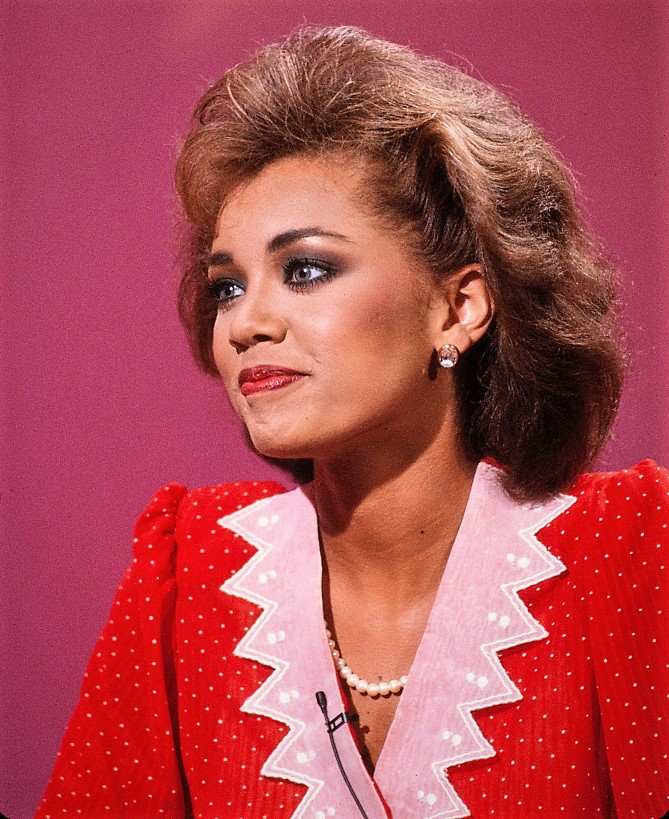
Vanessa Williams, the first Black woman to win the Miss America pageant, in 1984.

These instilled standards often adhered to respectability politics, especially as these pageant organizations tried to gain acknowledgement from mainstream media. Organizations spotlighted competitors who represented traditional femininity often seen in white women's pageants, as well as clothing and mannerisms that mirrored conventional pageants. Many Black women entering Black pageants altered their behavior to suit the more accepted white middle class standards, gaining access to participating in what they otherwise would not be permitted. These exclusionary practices continued throughout the entire 20th century, with Vanessa Williams in 1984 becoming the first Black woman to win a major national beauty pageant.

Though not all Black pageants exhibited these restrictions. Some pageants, such as 1961's "Miss Bronze" pageant, originated with the purpose of defying the same standards most organizations strictly followed. This competition organized to address colorism by including Black women with a wide range of skin-tones, without adherence to the principles followed in most Black beauty pageants. The "Miss Bronze" pageant encouraged representation of Black women throughout the diaspora that had not been in mainstream pageantry or media.
