= Unity Hall =

- U.S. National Register of Historic Places
- Chicago Landmark
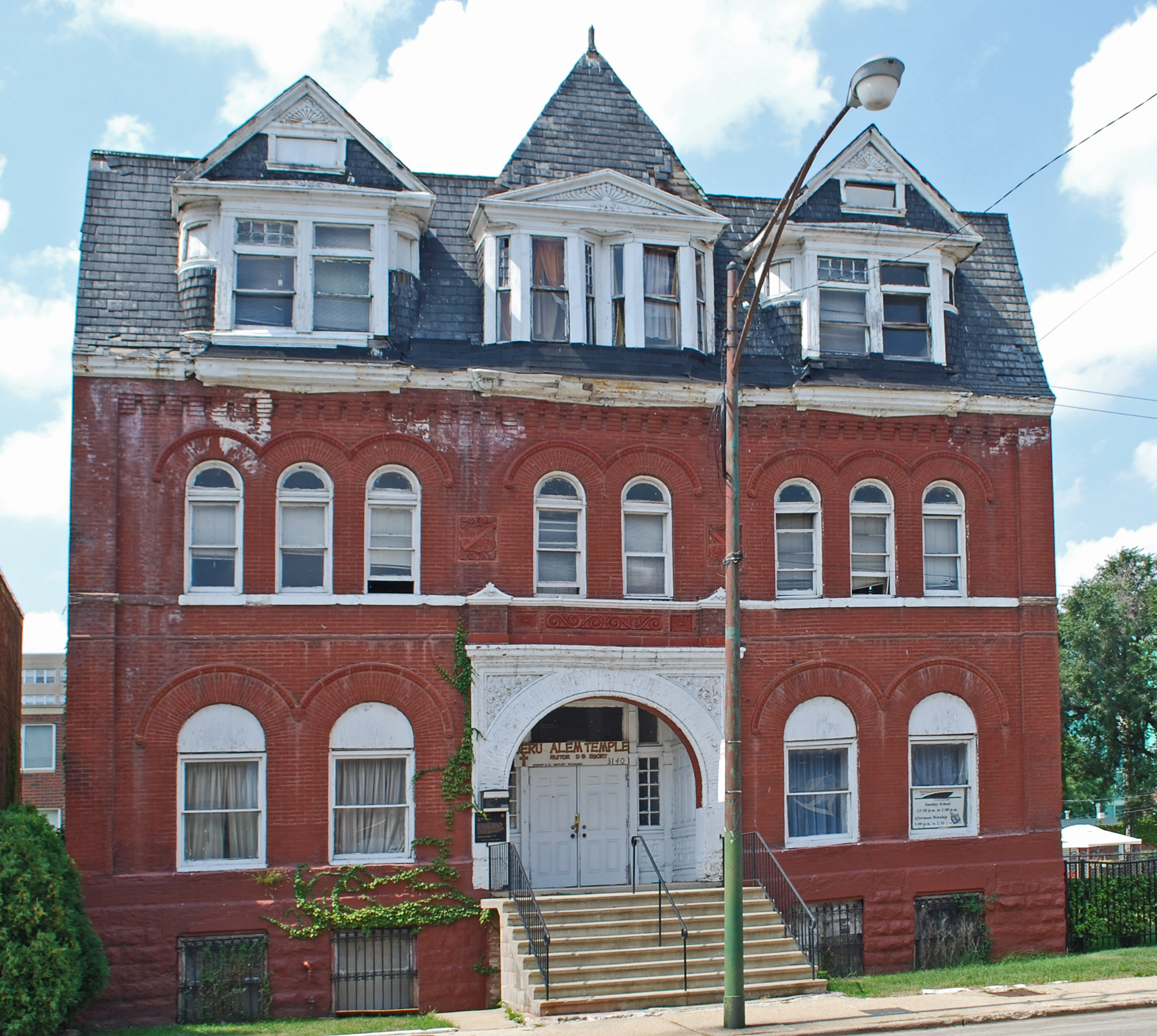

- Location within Chicago metropolitan area Location within Illinois Location within the United States
- Location: 3140 S. Indiana Ave., Chicago, Illinois
- Coordinates: 41°50′16″N 87°37′21″W
- Area: less than one acre
- Built: 1887
- Architect: Dixon, L.B.
- MPS: Black Metropolis TR
- NRHP reference No.: 86001092

Significant dates
- Added to NRHP: April 30, 1986
- Designated CHICL: September 9, 1998

Unity Hall is a historic building located at 3140 S. Indiana Ave. in the Douglas community area of Chicago, Illinois. Built in 1887, the building originally served as a Jewish social club called the Lakeside Club. The red brick building, designed by local architect L.B. Dixon, features terra cotta decorations and sheet metal edging. In 1917, Chicago alderman Oscar Stanton De Priest founded the Peoples Movement Club and made Unity Hall its headquarters. De Priest was the first African-American to serve on the Chicago City Council, and he established the Peoples Movement Club to organize the black community politically. The Peoples Movement Club became "one of the best organized political groups" in Chicago's Black Metropolis neighborhood, and De Priest became the first African-American U.S. Representative from the northern states in 1928.

After the Peoples Movement Club left the building, William L. Dawson used it as his political headquarters. From the 1950s onward, the building had mainly been used by churches. It is currently vacant and was placed on Preservation Chicago's list of the most endangered historic properties in the city.

The building was added to the National Register of Historic Places on April 30, 1986. It was named a Chicago Landmark on September 9, 1998.
