= State Street (Chicago) =

Street in Chicago, Illinois

- 0 East/West
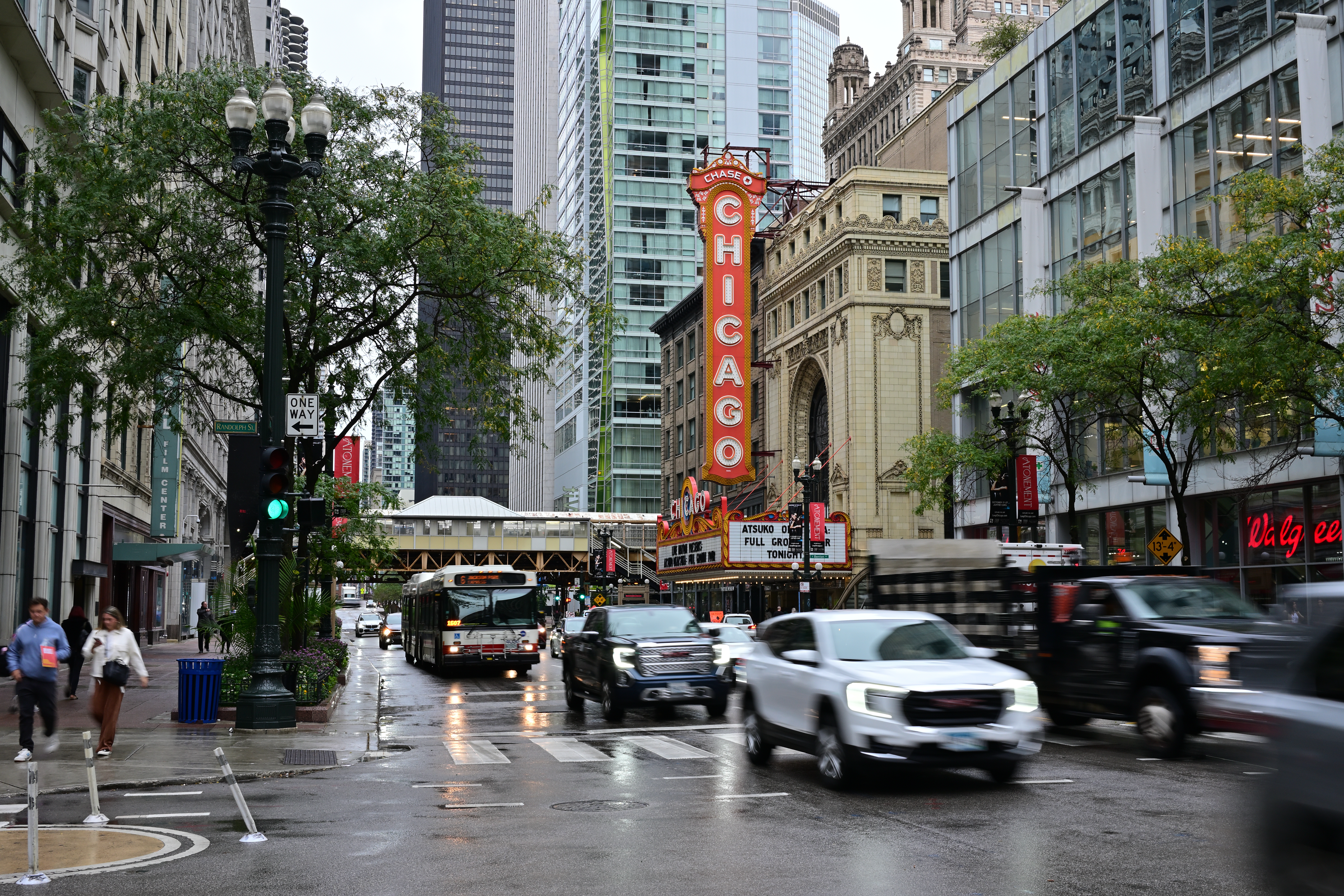
- State Street at Randolph Street, 2024
- Interactive map of State Street
- Former name: State Road
- Location: Will and Cook counties in Illinois, United States
- South end: New Monee Road in Crete
- Major junctions: Burville Road in Crete; Dorset Lane in Crete; US 30 in Chicago Heights; Main Street in Glenwood; Main Street in Glenwood; Merrill Street in Glenwood; Williams Street in Thornton; US 6 in South Holland; IL 83 at the South Holland–Dolton line; Wentworth Avenue in Riverdale; 140th Street in Riverdale; Dead end in Riverdale; 127th Street in West Pullman; I-57 / I-94 / US 12 / US 20 in Roseland; I-90 Toll / Chicago Skyway in Greater Grand Crossing; I-55 in Near South Side
- North end: North Ave in The Loop

State Street is a large south–north street, also one of the main streets, in Chicago, Illinois, United States and its south suburbs. Its intersection with Madison Street (41.8820°N 87.6278°W) has marked the origin for Chicago's address system since 1909. State begins in the north at North Avenue, the south end of Lincoln Park, runs south through the heart of the Chicago Loop, and ends at the southern city limits, intersecting 127th Street along the bank of the Little Calumet River. It resumes north of 137th Street in Riverdale and runs south intermittently through Chicago's south suburbs until terminating at New Monee Road in Crete, Illinois.

From north to south, State Street traverses the following community areas of Chicago: Near North Side to the Chicago River, Chicago Loop to Roosevelt Road, Near South Side to 26th Street, Douglas to 39th Street, Grand Boulevard to 51st Street, Washington Park to 63rd Street, Grand Crossing to 79th Street, Chatham to 91st Street, Roseland to 115th Street, and West Pullman to 127th Street, where it terminates across from Riverdale Bend Woods. The street runs parallel and adjacent to the Dan Ryan Expressway from 65th Street south to just beyond 95th Street, where State Street crosses the I-94 Bishop Ford Memorial Freeway to enter Roseland.

== History ==
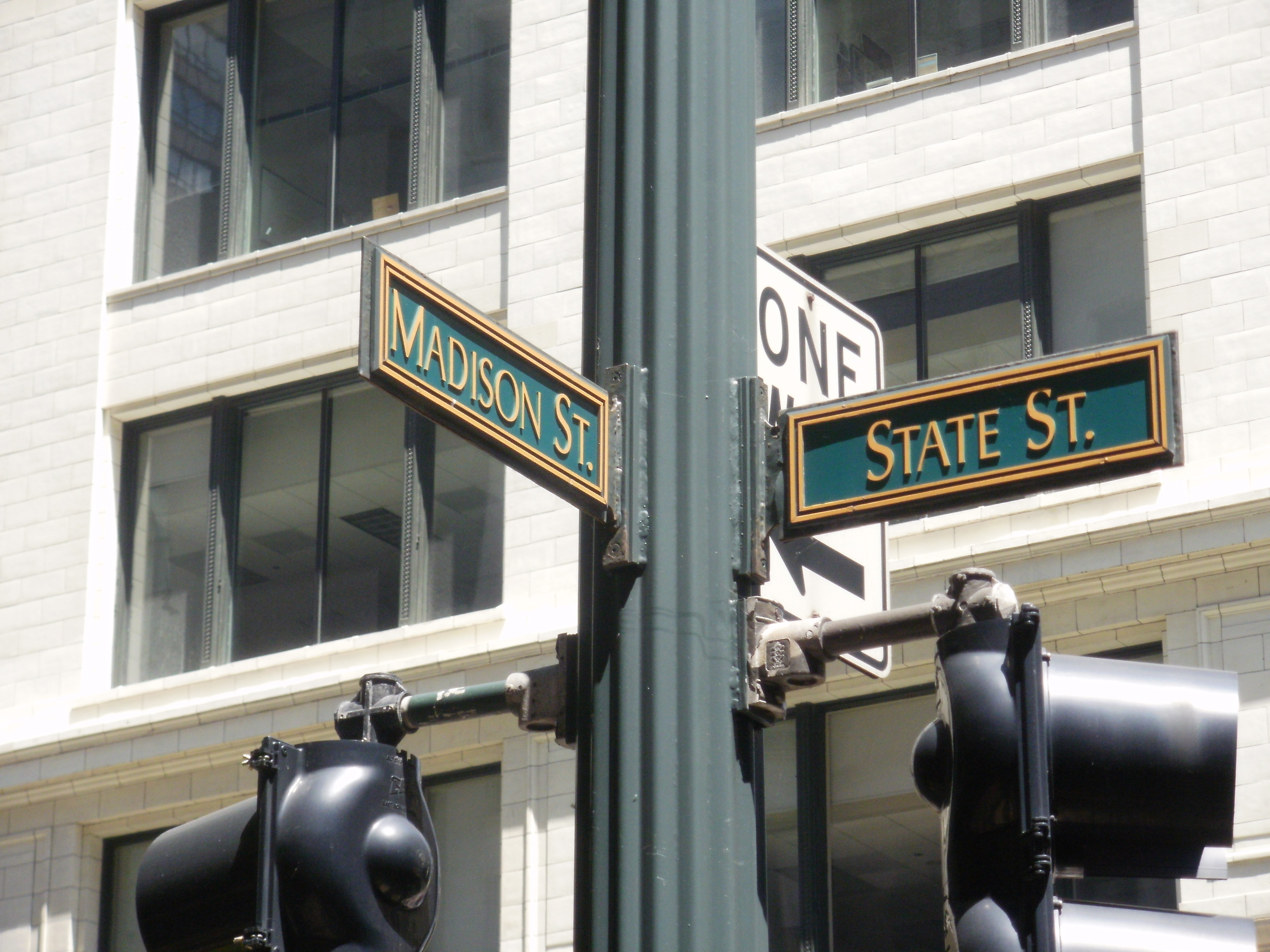
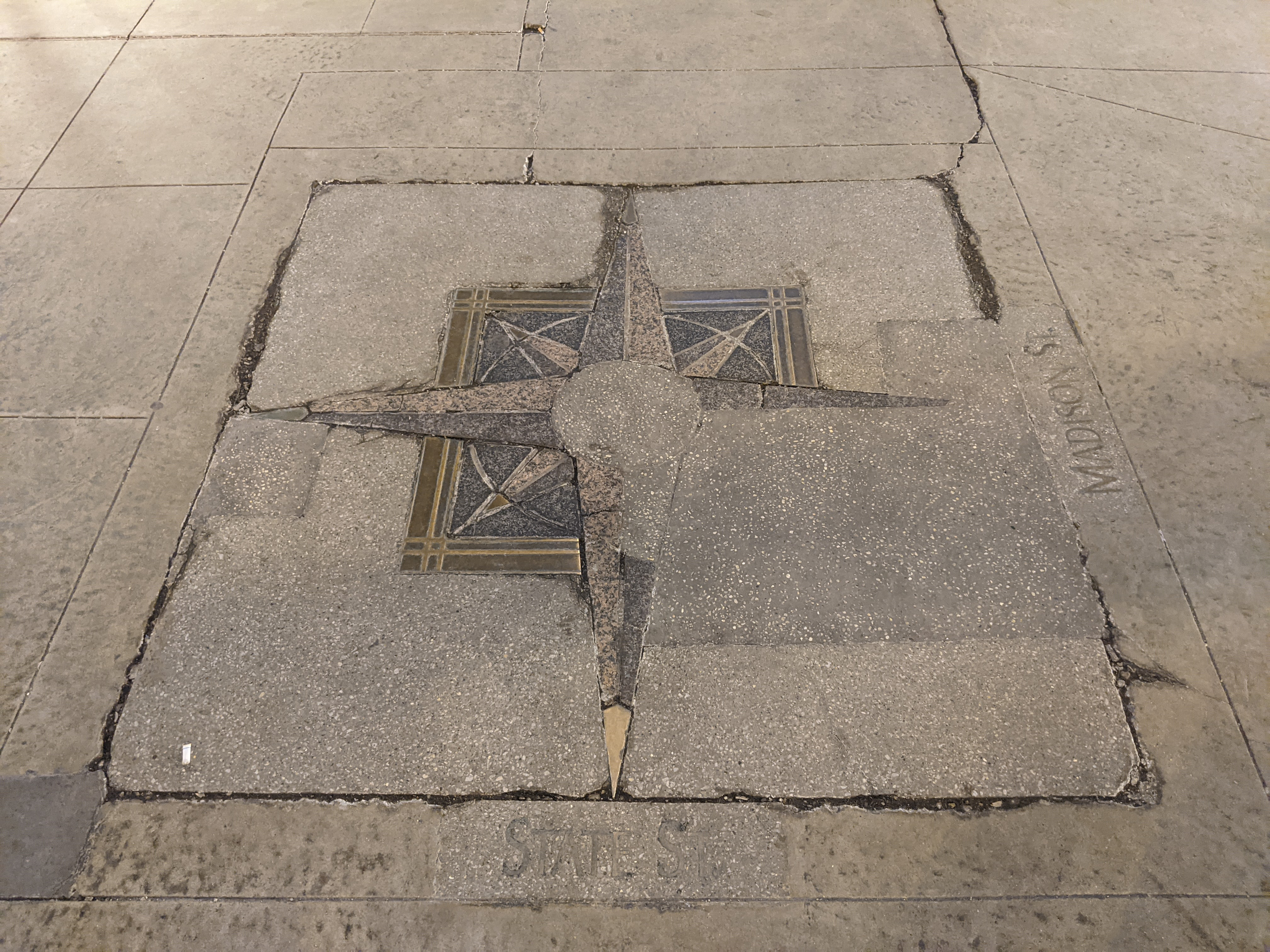
The intersection of Madison Street and State Street is the origin of Chicago's numbering system.

The northern portion of the Vincennes Trace or Vincennes Trail, a buffalo (bison) migration route and a Native American trail which ran some 250 miles to Vincennes, Indiana, was called Hubbard's Trace or Hubbard's Trail since it connected Chicago with Gurdon Saltonstall Hubbard's more southerly trading outposts. It took on the name State Road after some state-funded improvements. Vincennes Avenue, one of Chicago's rare diagonal streets, is a vestige of the Vincennes Trace, and further south the trail eventually became Illinois Route 1. In its early days, State Road was unpaved and known for having mud so deep it was jokingly said that it could suck down a horse and buggy. In the late 1860s, Potter Palmer embarked on efforts to raise the profile and prestige of State Street. He enticed Marshall Field and Levi Leiter to move their prosperous and growing department store, Field, Leiter & Co., to the corner of State and Washington Streets in 1868, and he built his own Palmer House Hotel nearby in 1870. For many years the city's most well-known seafood retailer, Burhop's Seafood, was located on North State Street, as well as the historic Chicago Theatre. The latter was lit by Commercial Light Company in 1958, making it the brightest thoroughfare in the world, according to the Chicago Tribune.

== State Street shopping ==
State Street at Madison Street, 1897

State Street became a shopping destination during the 1900s and is referred to in the song "Chicago", which mentions "State Street, that great street." In 1979, the downtown portion was converted into a pedestrian mall with only bus traffic allowed. Mayor Richard M. Daley oversaw the State Street Revitalization Project and on November 15, 1996, the street was reopened to traffic.

During the second half of the 20th century, State Street was eclipsed by Michigan Avenue's Magnificent Mile as a shopping district. Various projects to restore State Street's shopping attraction have been met with some success, and the State Street corridor is gaining residential as well as more traditional commercial development. Anchored by Macy's Chicago, the flagship location is the world's second largest department store by square footage. The 12-story building features many historical landmarks including a Tiffany & Co. Dome.

The Block 37 opened in 2009 at State and Washington, bringing with it a large group of upscale retailers to North State Street including Anthropologie, L'Occitane en Provence, Banana Republic, Zara, Disney Store, Godiva, Sephora, and an AMC Theatres location on the fourth floor. On the Pedway level is the Blue Line's Washington station and Red Line's Lake station both connected underground.

The department store chain Carson Pirie Scott closed their flagship store on State Street on February 21, 2007, after over 100 years of business in that location. Target opened their 125,000 square feet State Street store in the landmark Carson Pirie Scott building later in 2012.

On January 12, 2012, Walgreens opened its U.S. flagship location at Randolph Street, where it had previously existed from 1926 to 2005, when construction of Joffrey Tower necessitated its demolition. The renowned Chicago-based Joffrey Ballet is housed on the upper floors of the tower.

In October 2015, Michael Jordan opened his first store at 32 South State St. and is branded as 32 South State. The flagship store included retail shopping, Chicago Bulls memorabilia, a training lab for local youth, and a basketball court on the upper levels.

In July 2019, Primark announced its U.S. market expansion to Chicago with a three-level 45,000 square foot flagship location on State Street where Gap formerly housed its flagship store. The location is scheduled to open in 2020 and will be its first store in the Midwest.

In November 2019, Uniqlo opened its second Chicago location on North State Street replacing the two-level H&M at 22 N. State.

== Transportation ==
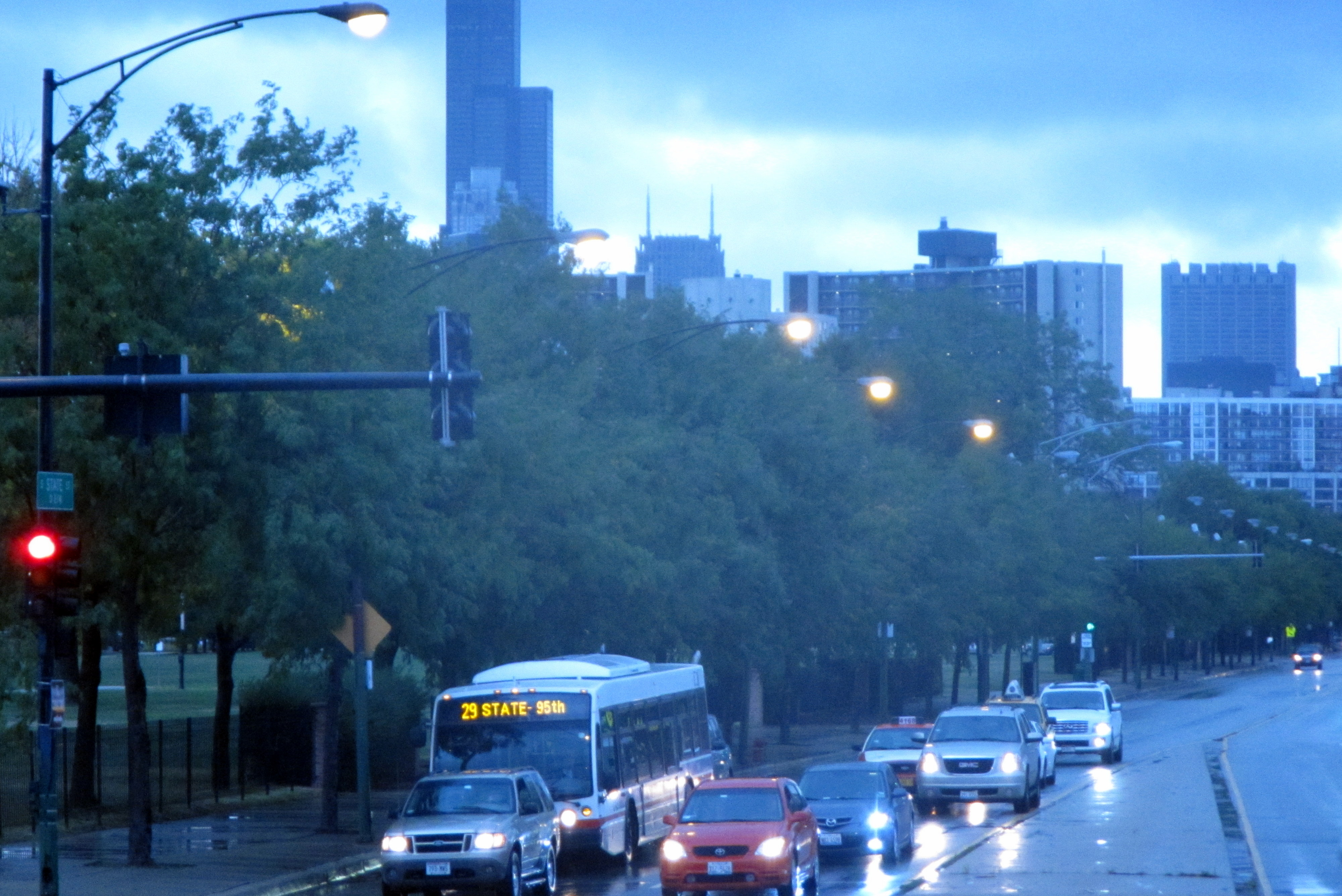
CTA route 29 bus at State Street and 24th Place

State Street is primarily served by 29 State, a CTA bus route that runs from Navy Pier to 95th/Dan Ryan station via State Street. At 69th Street, bus route 29 splits so that southbound buses travel along Lafayette Avenue and northbound buses travel along State Street; starting at the split, both of the streets become one-way frontage roads for the Dan Ryan Expressway. Multiple other bus routes, such as bus route 36 in downtown, run along State Street in segments to serve a train station or downtown.

The Red Line parallels State Street from 95th Street to Marquette Road and continues below State Street from 13th Street to Division Street. The Green Line parallels State Street from 40th Street to Harrison Street (the Orange Line runs concurrently with the Green Line from 18th Street to Harrison Street and into the Loop Elevated).

In addition, the Blue Island branch of the Metra Electric District serve State Street.

== Landmarks ==
=== Downtown ===
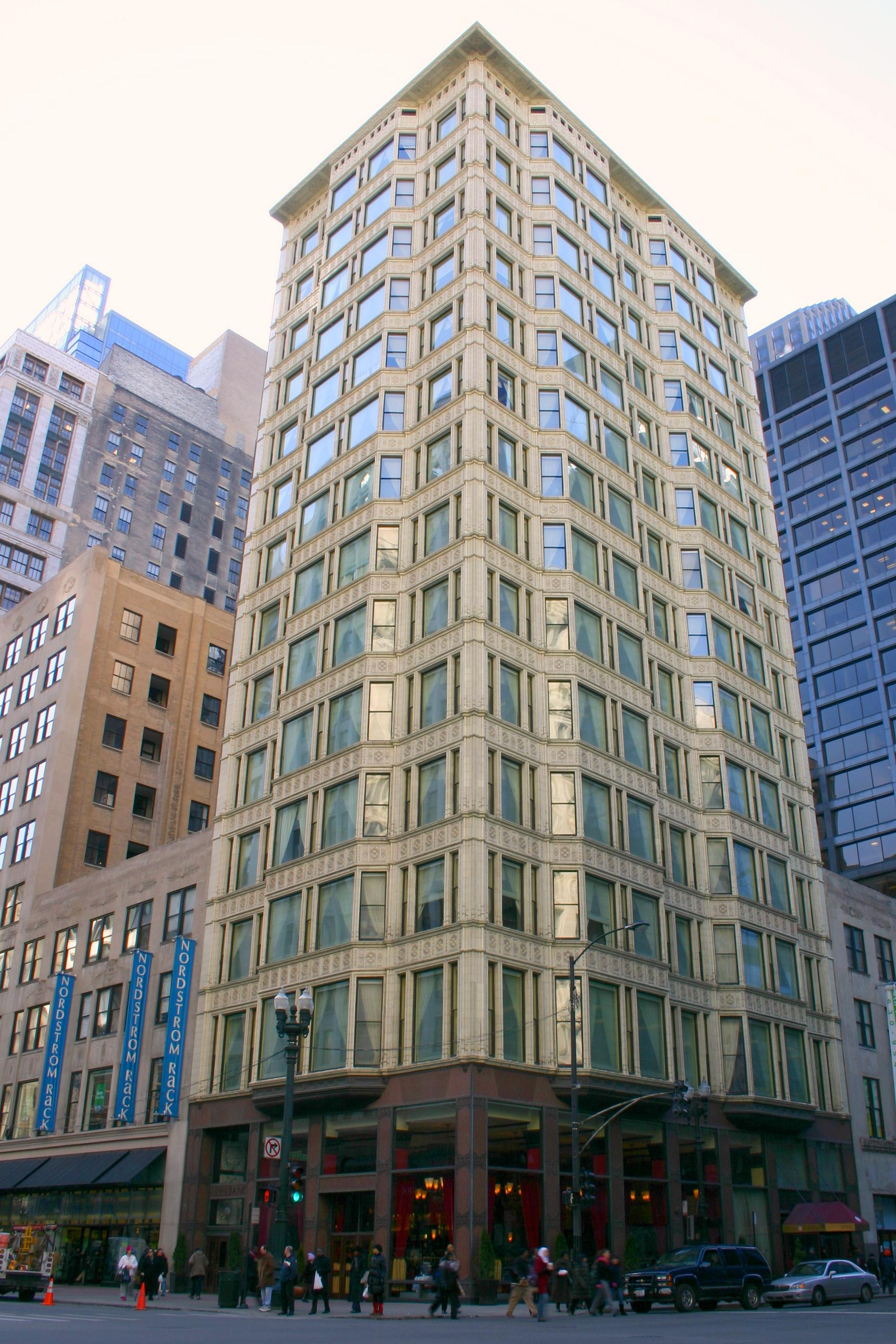
Reliance Building (1890), 32 N. State Street

State Street is the location of many landmarks in downtown Chicago:

- Chicago Archbishop's Mansion
- The Original Playboy Mansion
- Fisher Studio Houses
- Holy Name Cathedral
- Tree Studio Building and Annexes
- Marina City
- ABC7 News Studio
- Page Brothers Building
- Chicago Theatre
- Marshall Field and Company Building
- Block 37
- Reliance Building
- Carson, Pirie, Scott and Company Building
- A.M. Rothschild & Company Store (DePaul Center)
- Harold Washington Library
- Second Leiter Building
- University Center
- Mentor Building
- Palmer House

=== South Side ===
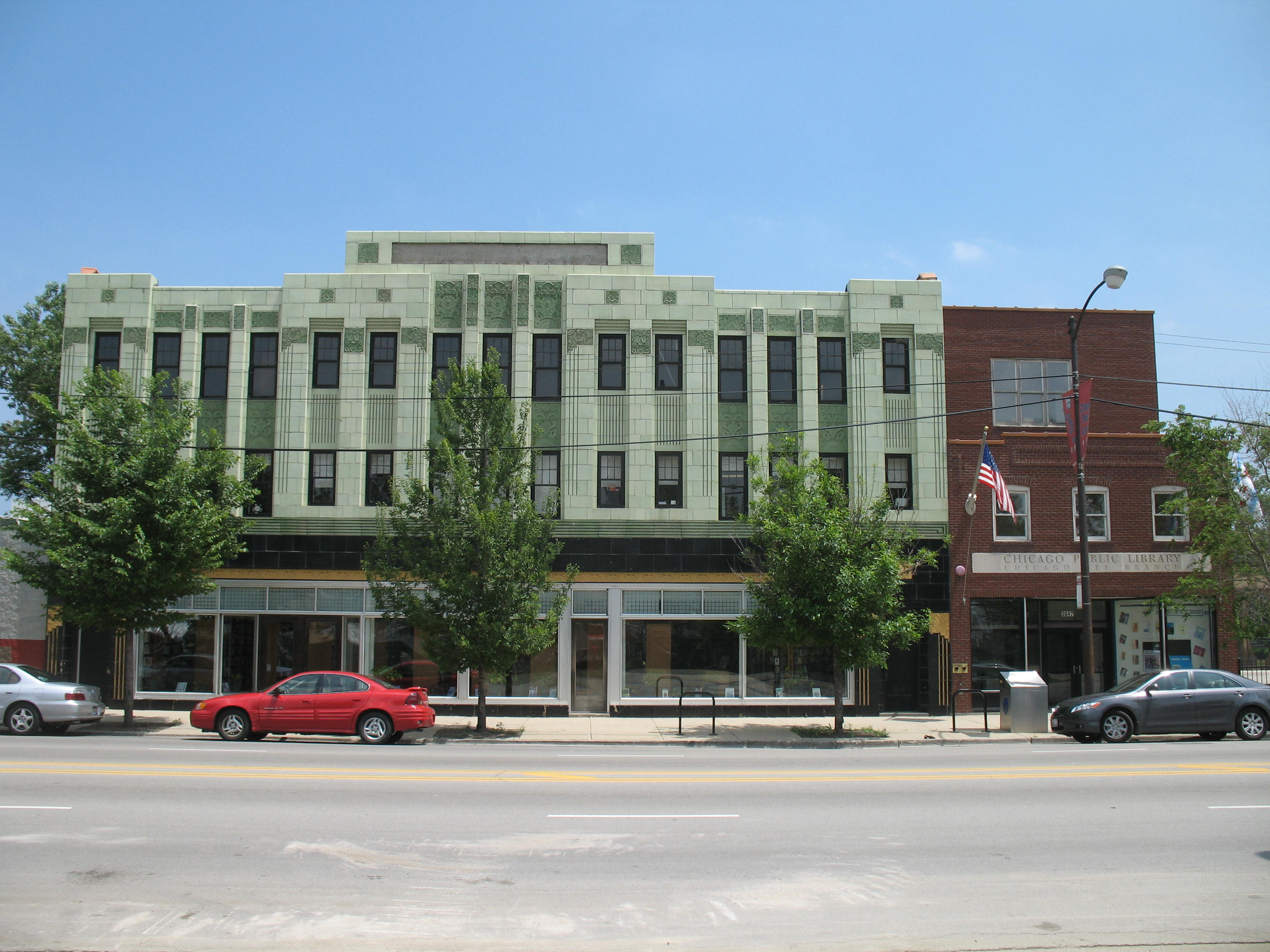
Chicago Bee Building, 3647-55 S. State

Landmarks on State Street in Chicago's South Side, south of Roosevelt Road, include:

- Black Metropolis-Bronzeville District
  - Chicago Bee Building
  - Overton Hygienic Building
- Illinois Institute of Technology Academic Campus
  - McCormick Tribune Campus Center
  - S.R. Crown Hall
  - Shimer College
  - State Street Village
- Roberts Temple Church of God in Christ Building
- Harold L. Ickes Homes
- Dearborn Homes
- Hilliard Towers Apartments
- South Park Manor Historic District

== Memorial ==
The bridge where State Street crosses the Chicago River is named the Bataan-Corregidor Memorial Bridge in honor of the World War II defenders of Bataan and Corregidor including those in the Bataan Death March.

== Gallery ==
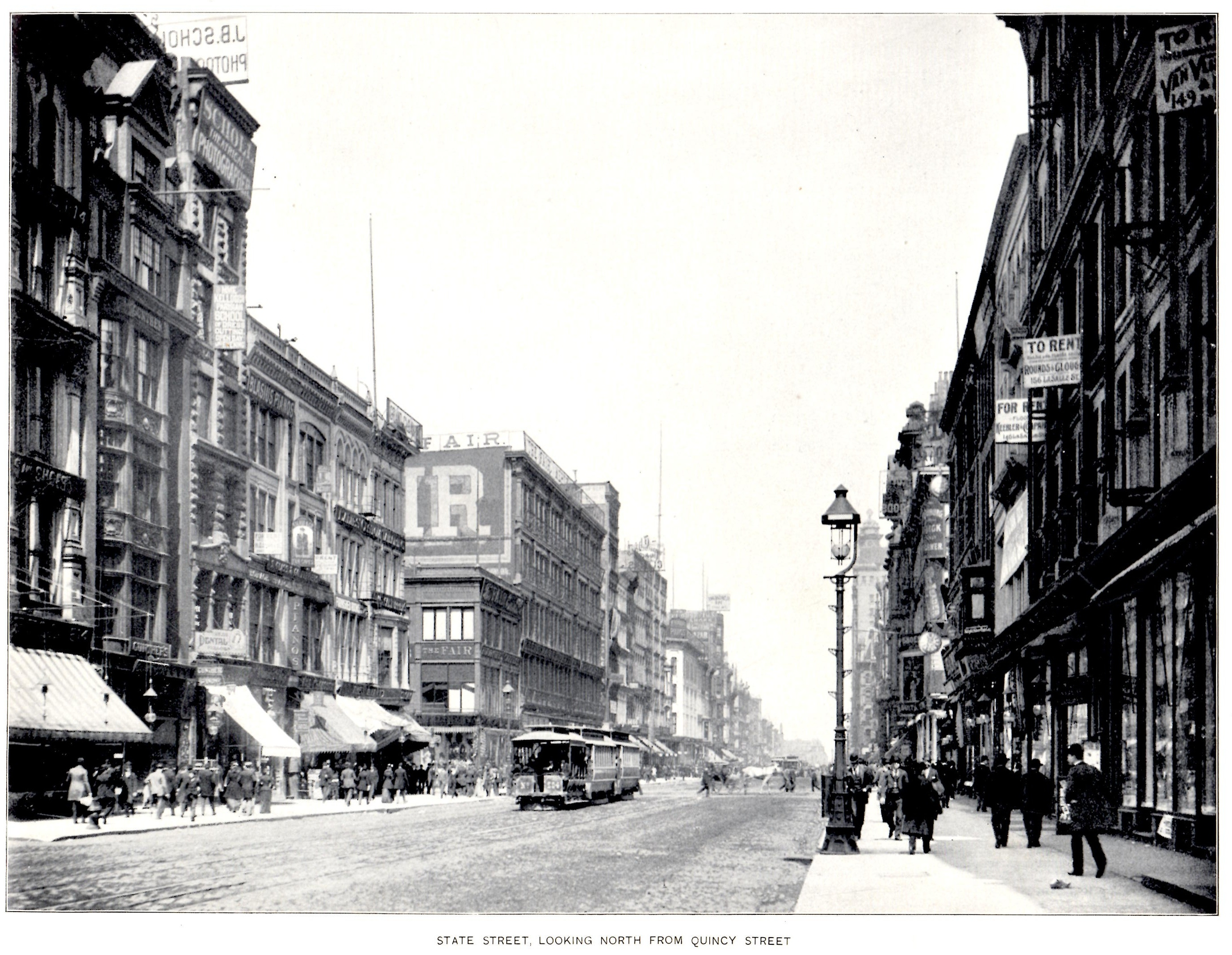
State Street in 1893

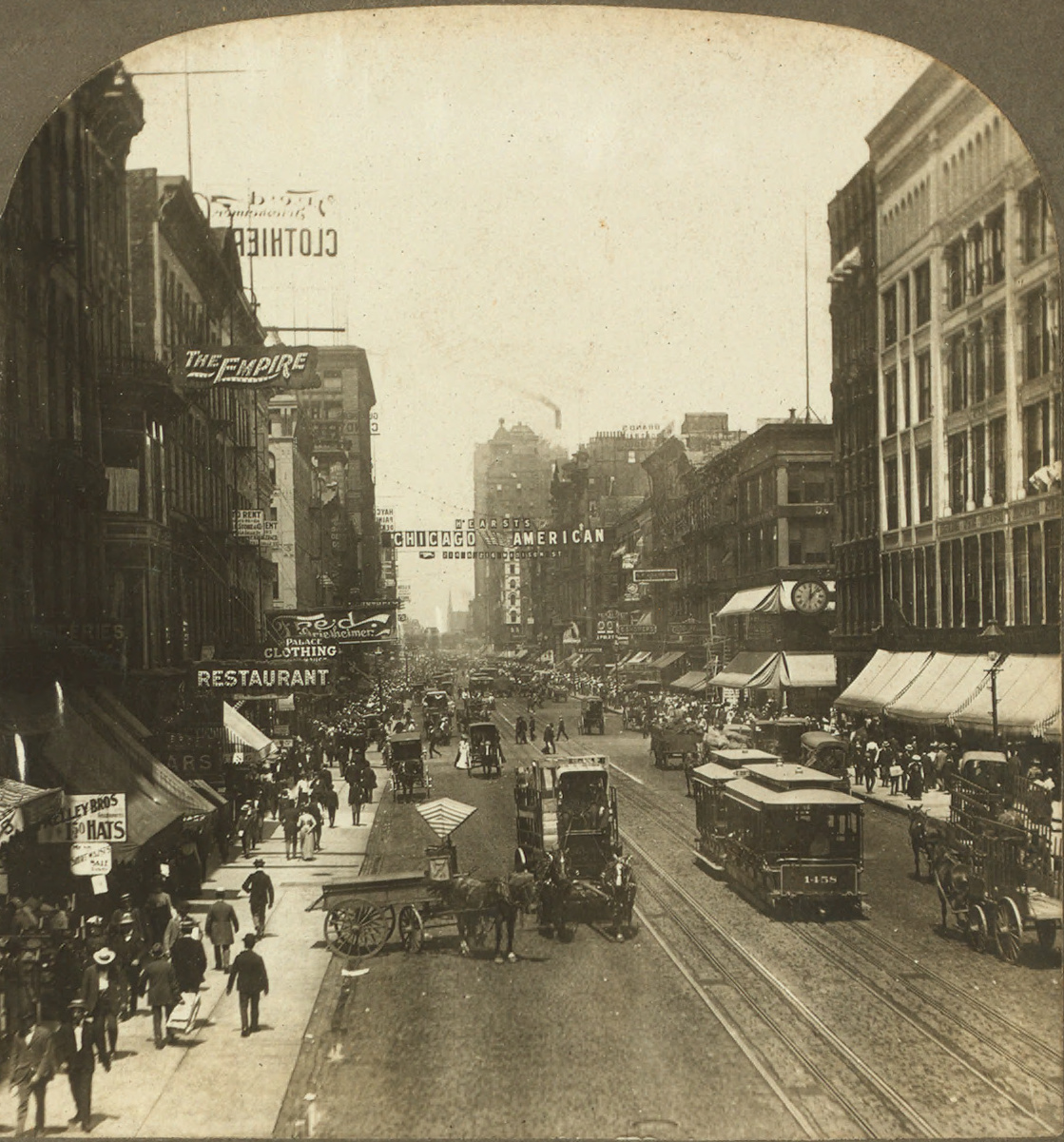
State Street circa the late 19th century

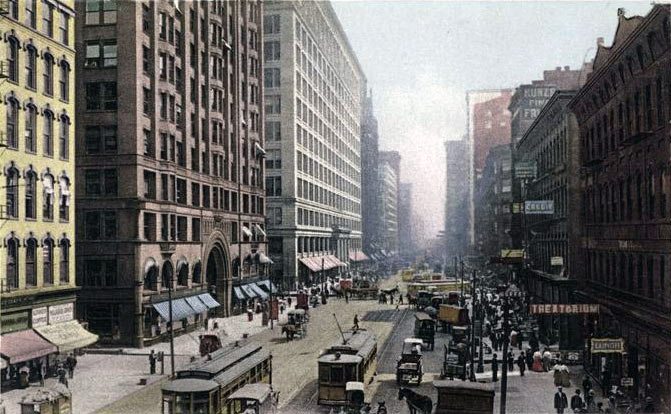
State Street in 1907

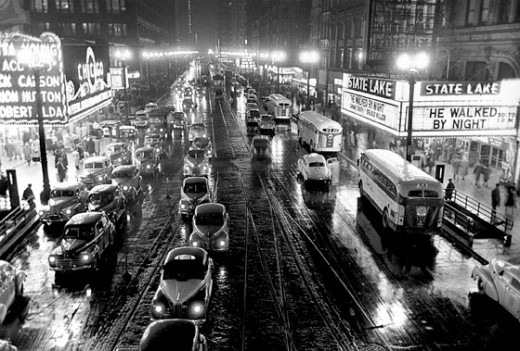
State Street in 1949 as photographed by Stanley Kubrick for Look Magazine

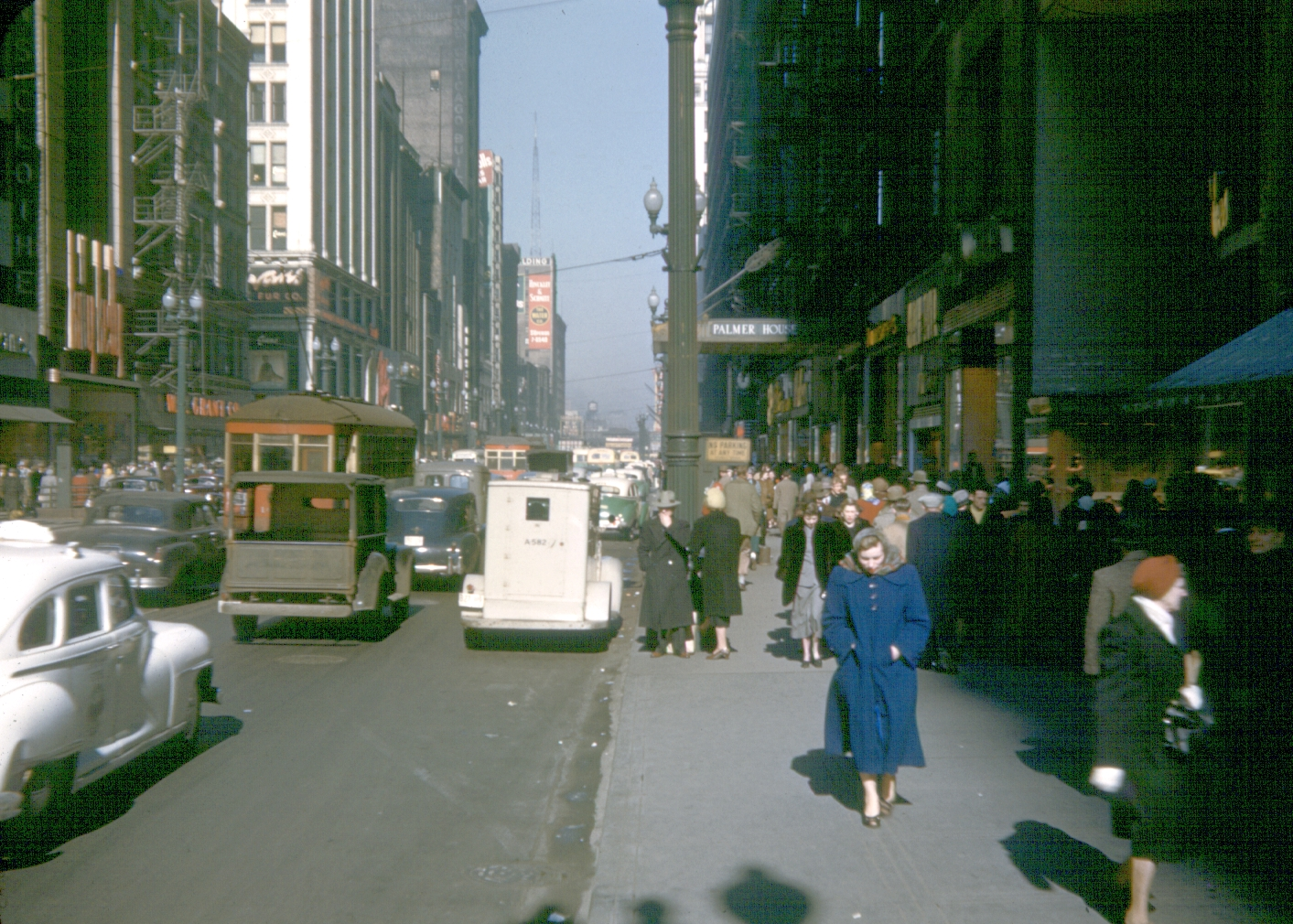
State Street in 1952

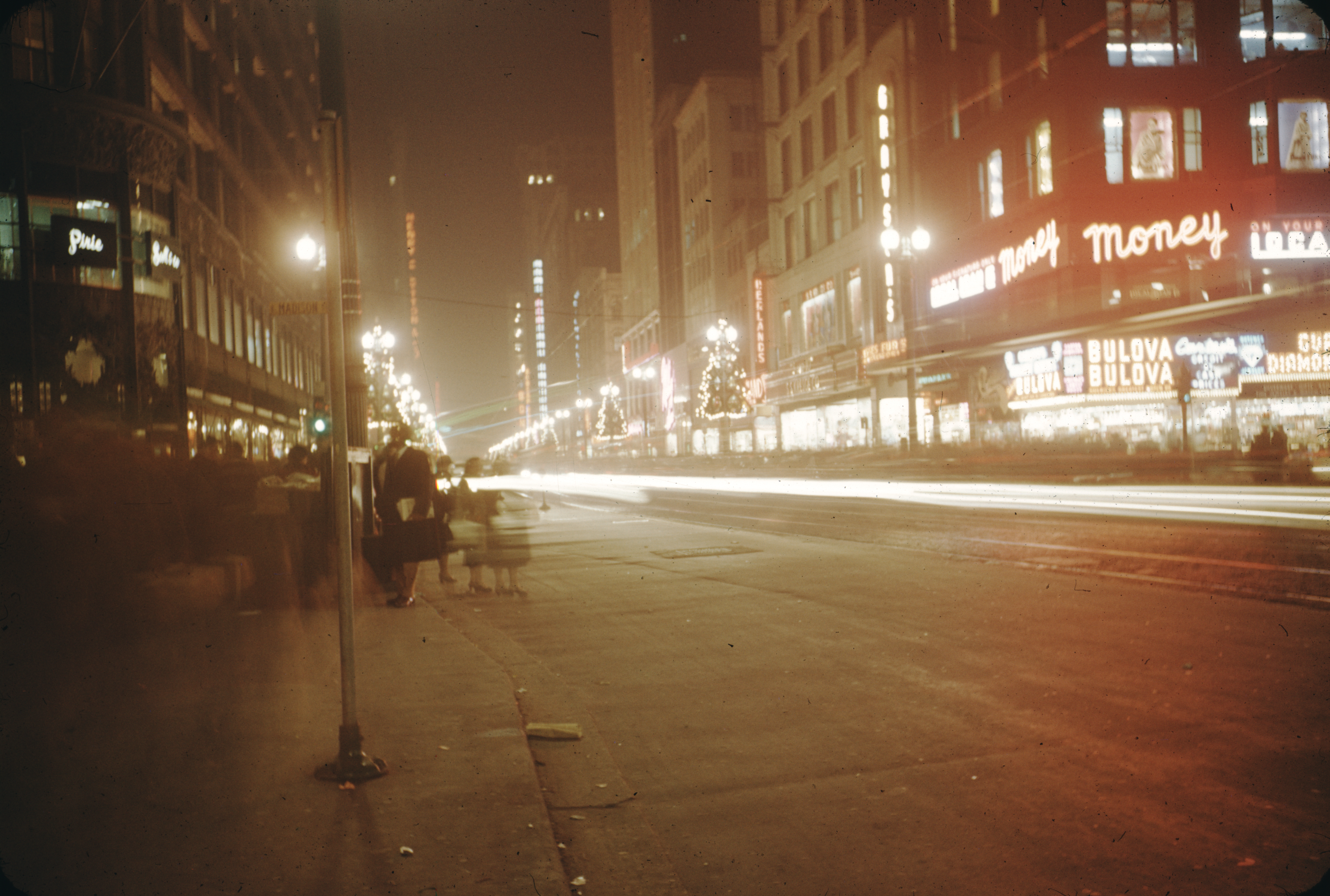
State Street in 1953

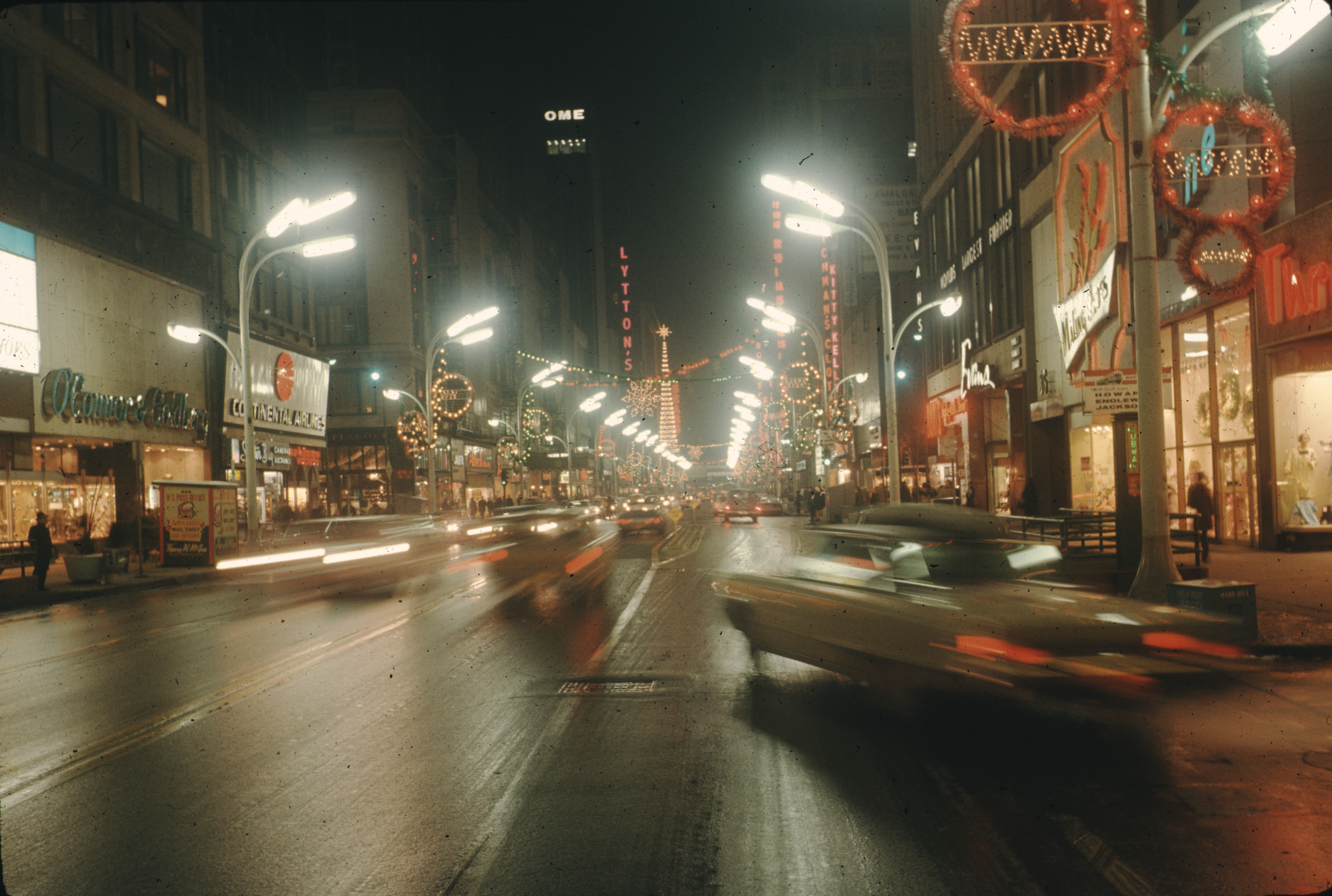
State Street in 1969

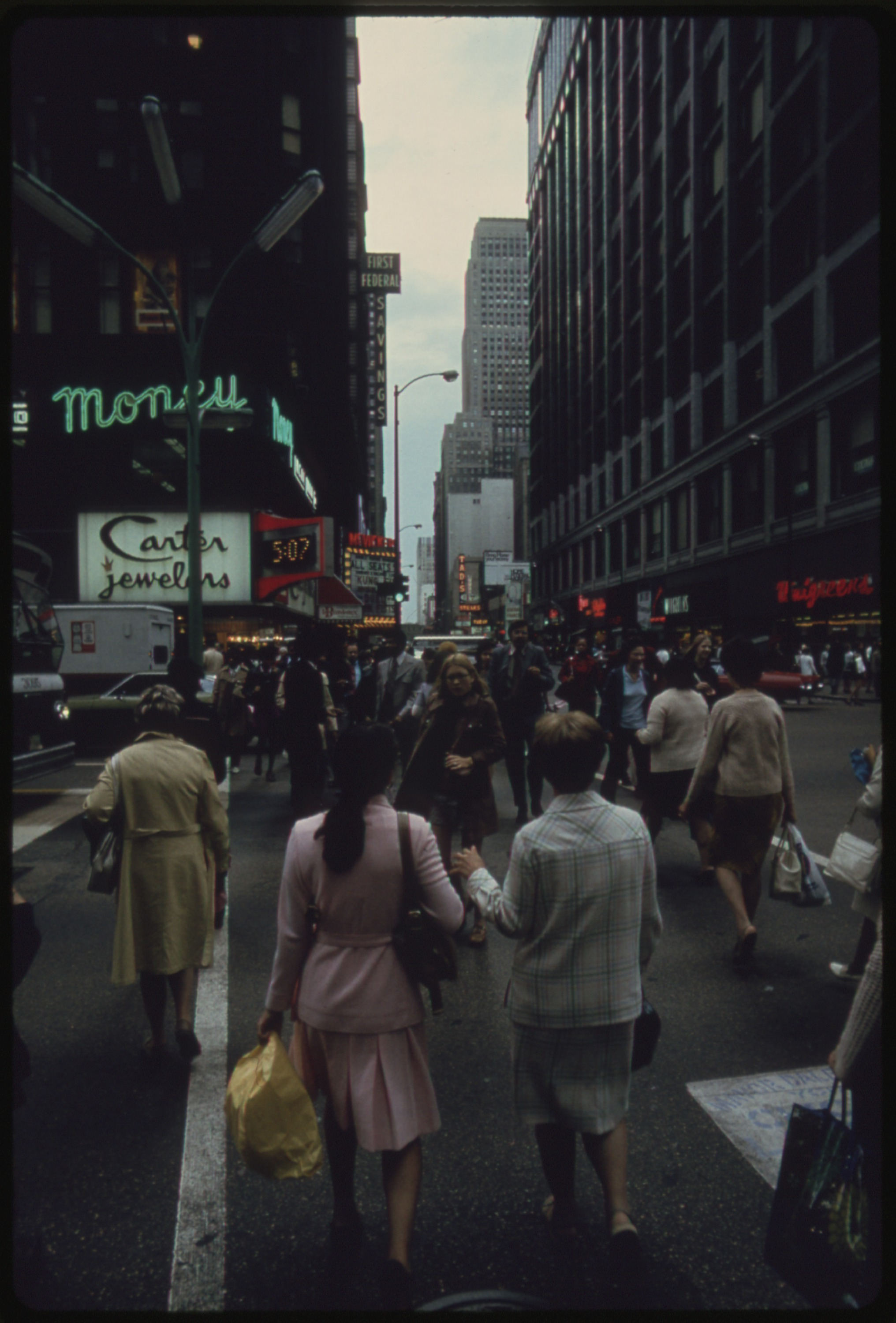
State Street in October 1973 as photographed by Documerica

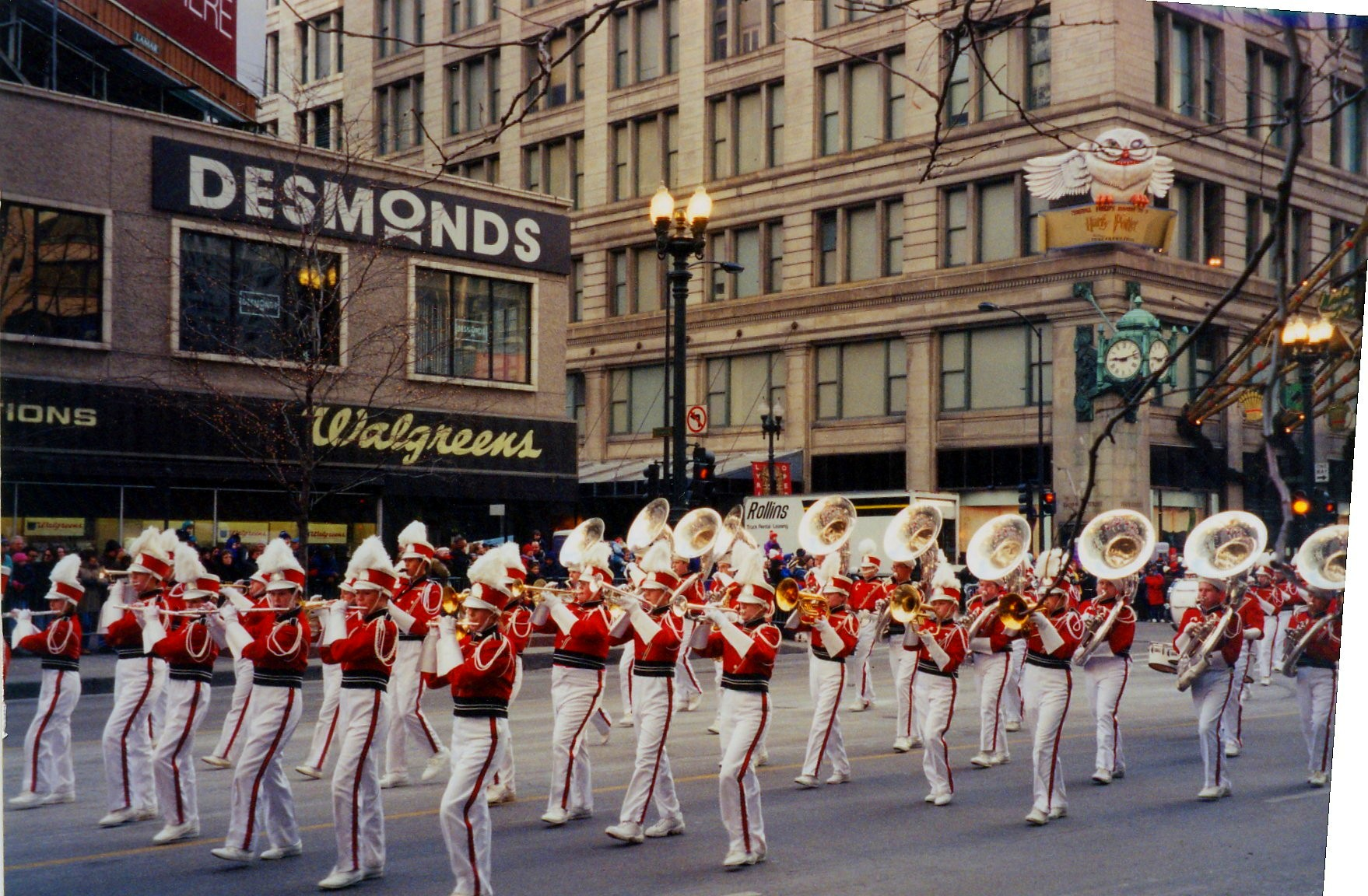
parade in 2000

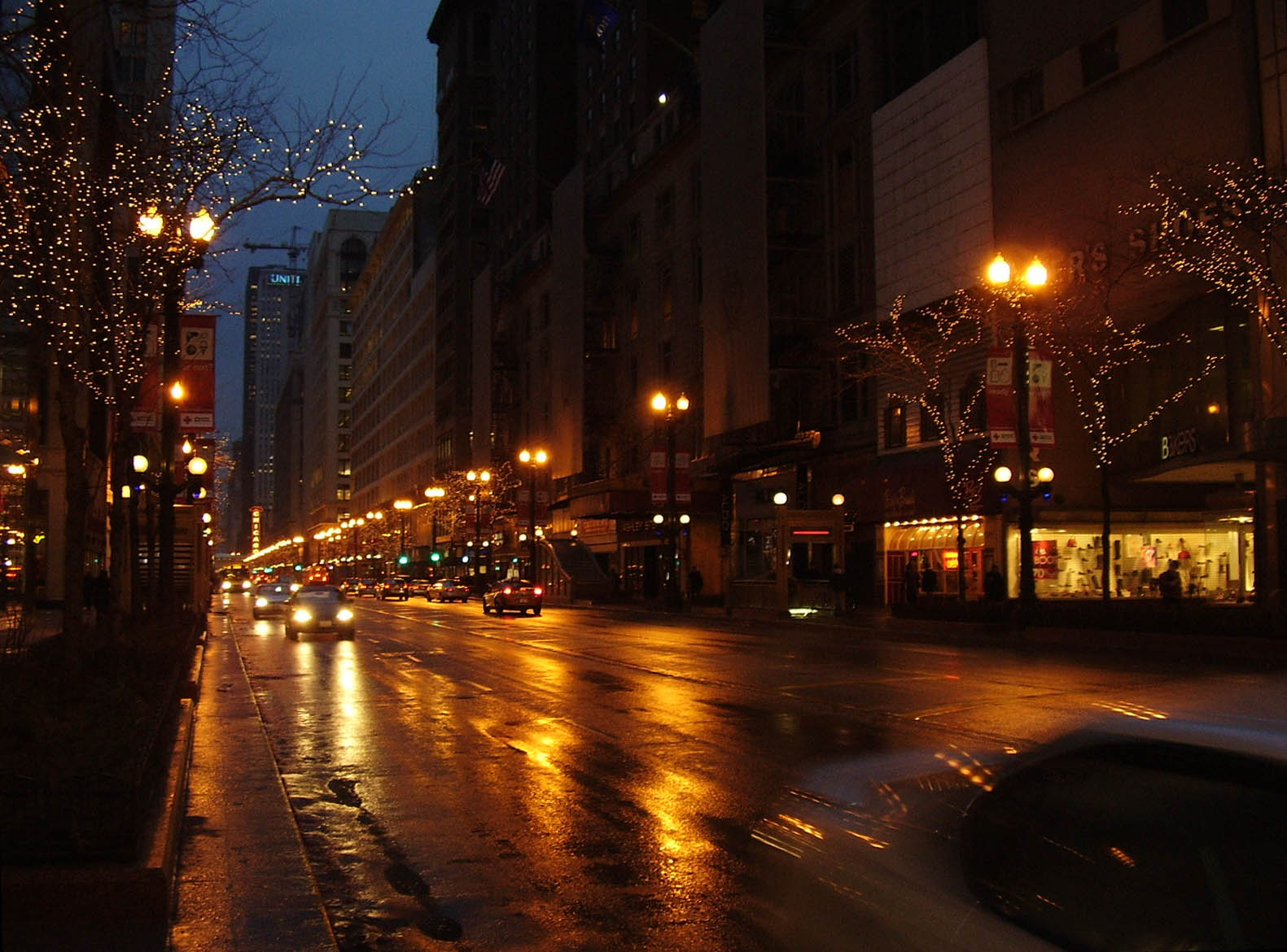
State Street looking north in 2007

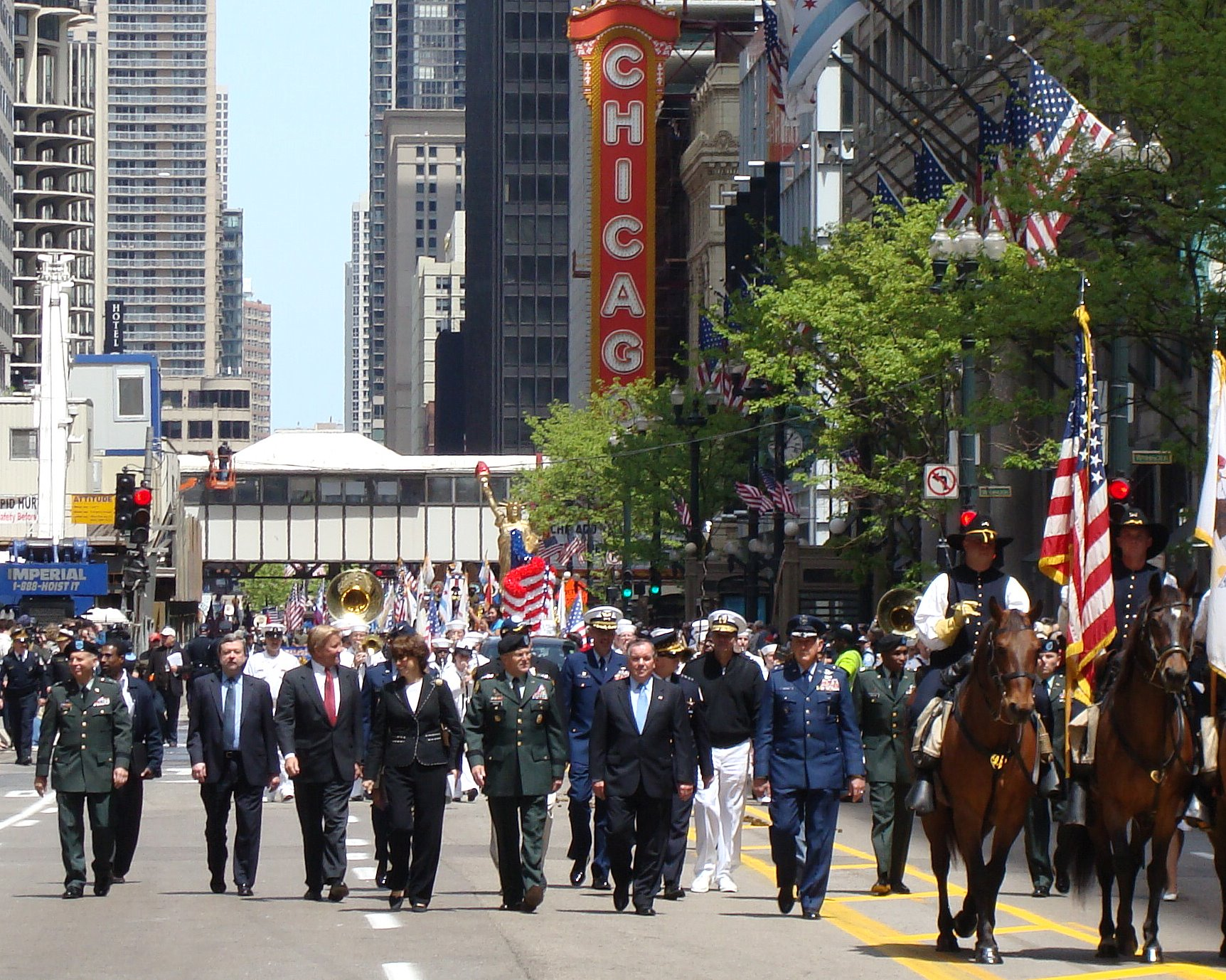
Chief of Staff of the United States Army Gen. George W. Casey Jr., Chicago Mayor Richard M. Daley, and other officials during the 2008 Memorial Day parade on State Street

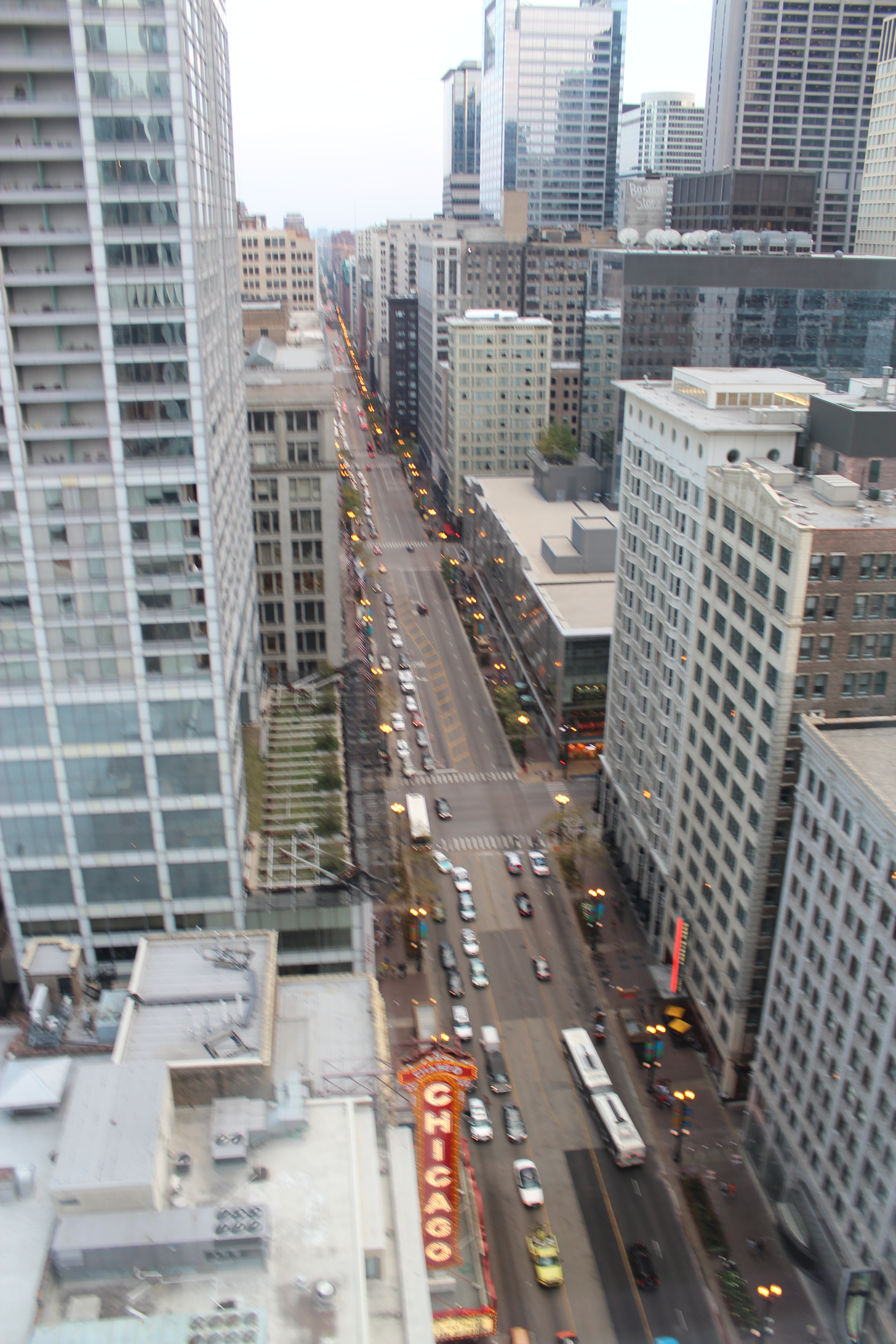
State Street, as viewed from Wit Roof Bar in 2012

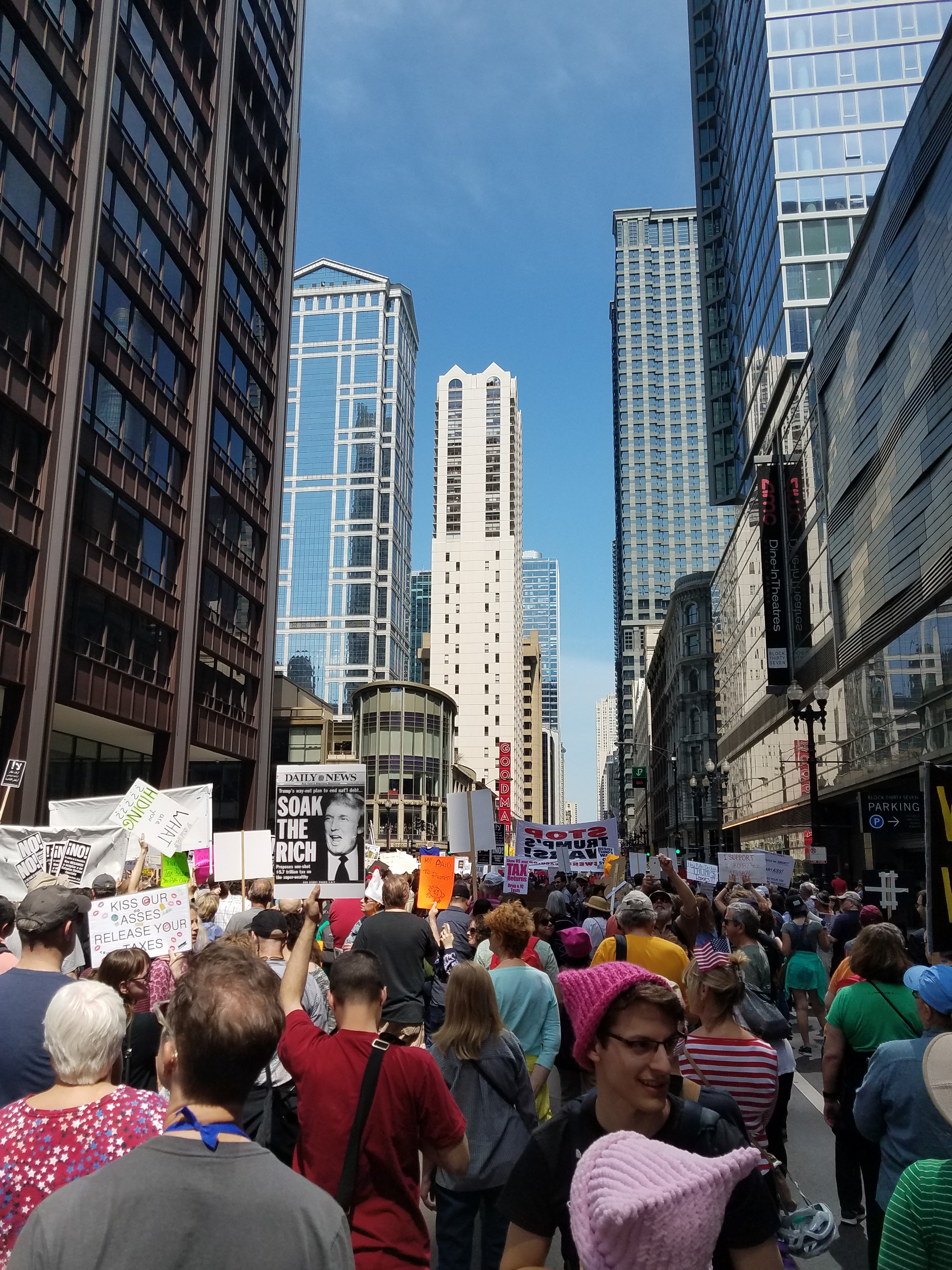
State Street in 2017 during the Tax Day March
