= Hygienic Manufacturing Company =

- Overton Hygienic Building
- U.S. National Register of Historic Places
- U.S. Historic district – Contributing property
- Chicago Landmark
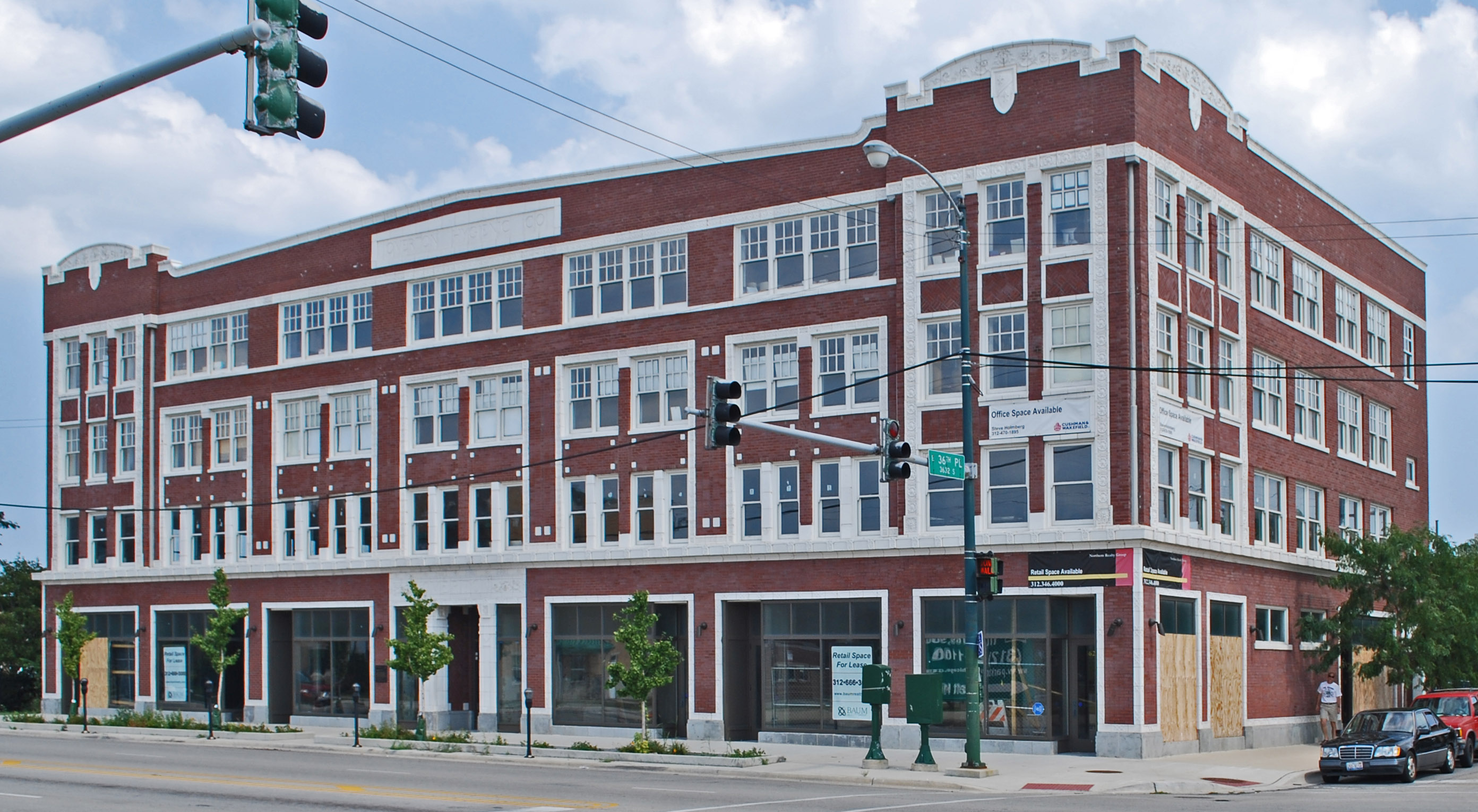

- Location within Chicago metropolitan area Location within Illinois Location within the United States
- Location: 3619-27 S. State St. Chicago, Illinois
- Coordinates: 41°49′40.94″N 87°37′34.26″W
- Built: 1922
- Architect: Z. Erol Smith
- MPS: Black Metropolis TR
- NRHP reference No.: 86001091

Significant dates
- Added to NRHP: April 30, 1986
- Designated CHICL: September 9, 1998

Hygienic Manufacturing Company, also known as Overton Hygienic Company, was a cosmetics company established by Anthony Overton. It was one of the United States's largest producers of African-American cosmetics. Anthony Overton also ran other businesses from the building, including the Victory Life Insurance Company and Douglass National Bank, the first nationally chartered, African-American-owned bank. The Overton Hygienic Building is a Chicago Landmark and part of the Black Metropolis-Bronzeville District in the Douglas community area of Chicago, Illinois. It is located at 3619-3627 South State Street.

The building was commissioned by Anthony Overton in 1922 as a combination of a store, office, and manufacturing building. It was regarded as one of the most important buildings within the district. Overton would later commission the Chicago Bee Building in 1929.

Walter T. Bailey, the first licensed African-American architect in the state of Illinois, had his first Chicago office on the second floor of the Overton Hygienic Building.

The building was later named the Palace Hotel and served for some time as a flophouse, with residents crowded into stalls 8 feet by 5½ feet. The second, third, and fourth floors each housed 125 stalls, with dormitory-style bathrooms and showers, for a total of 375 stalls. The building is now owned and being developed by the Mid-South Planning and Development Commission, which will use the building as an incubator for small businesses and startups within the Black Metropolis neighborhood.
