= Black Metropolis–Bronzeville District =

Neighborhood of Chicago, Illinois

Coordinates: 41.8200°N 87.6200°W

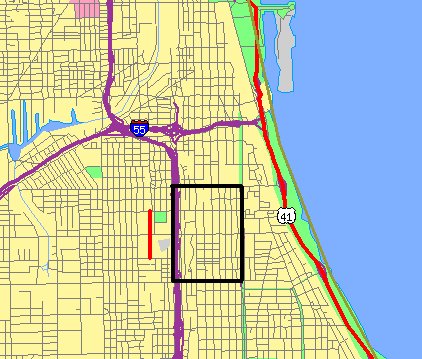
Bronzeville location map

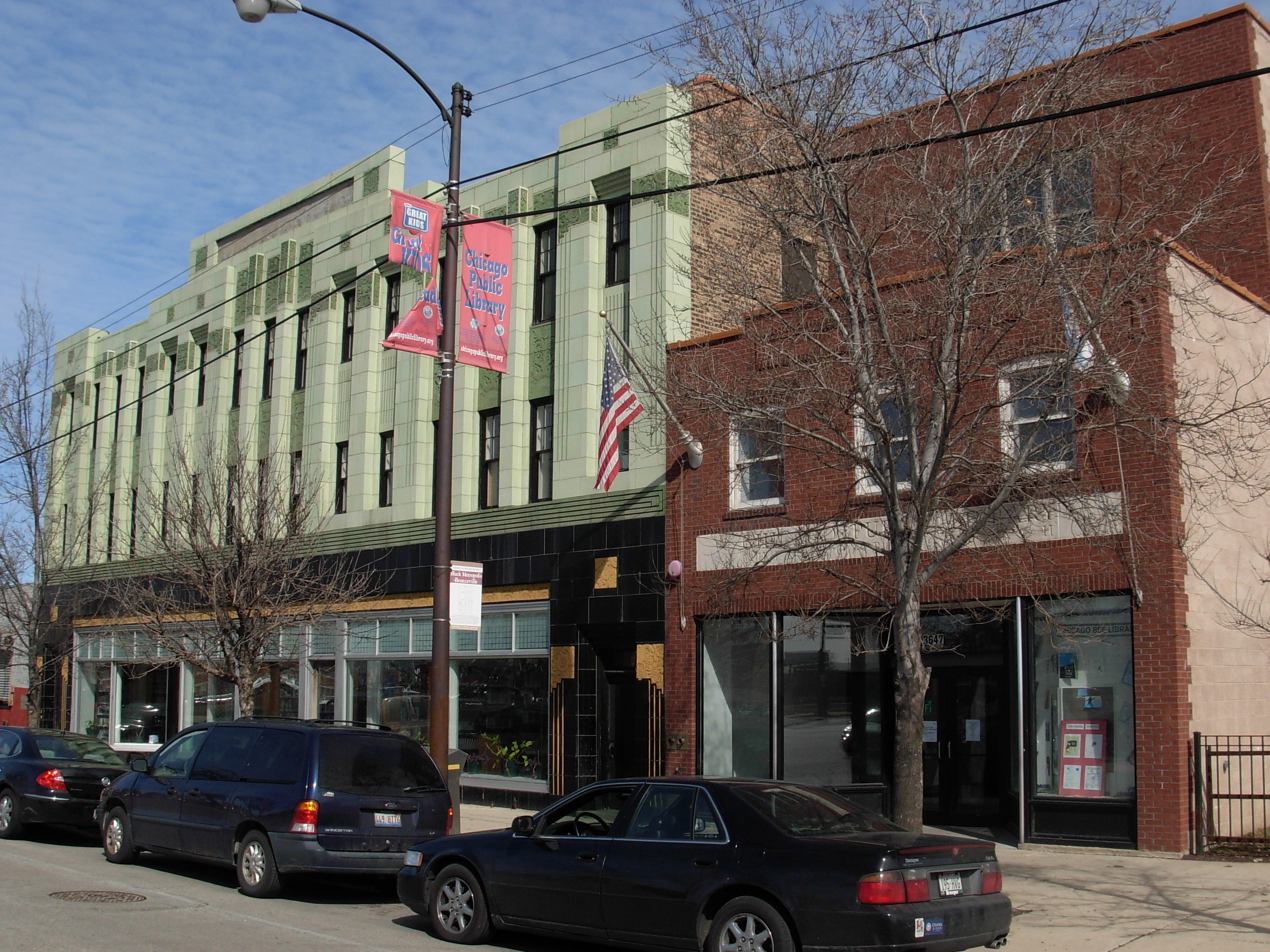
Chicago Bee Building.

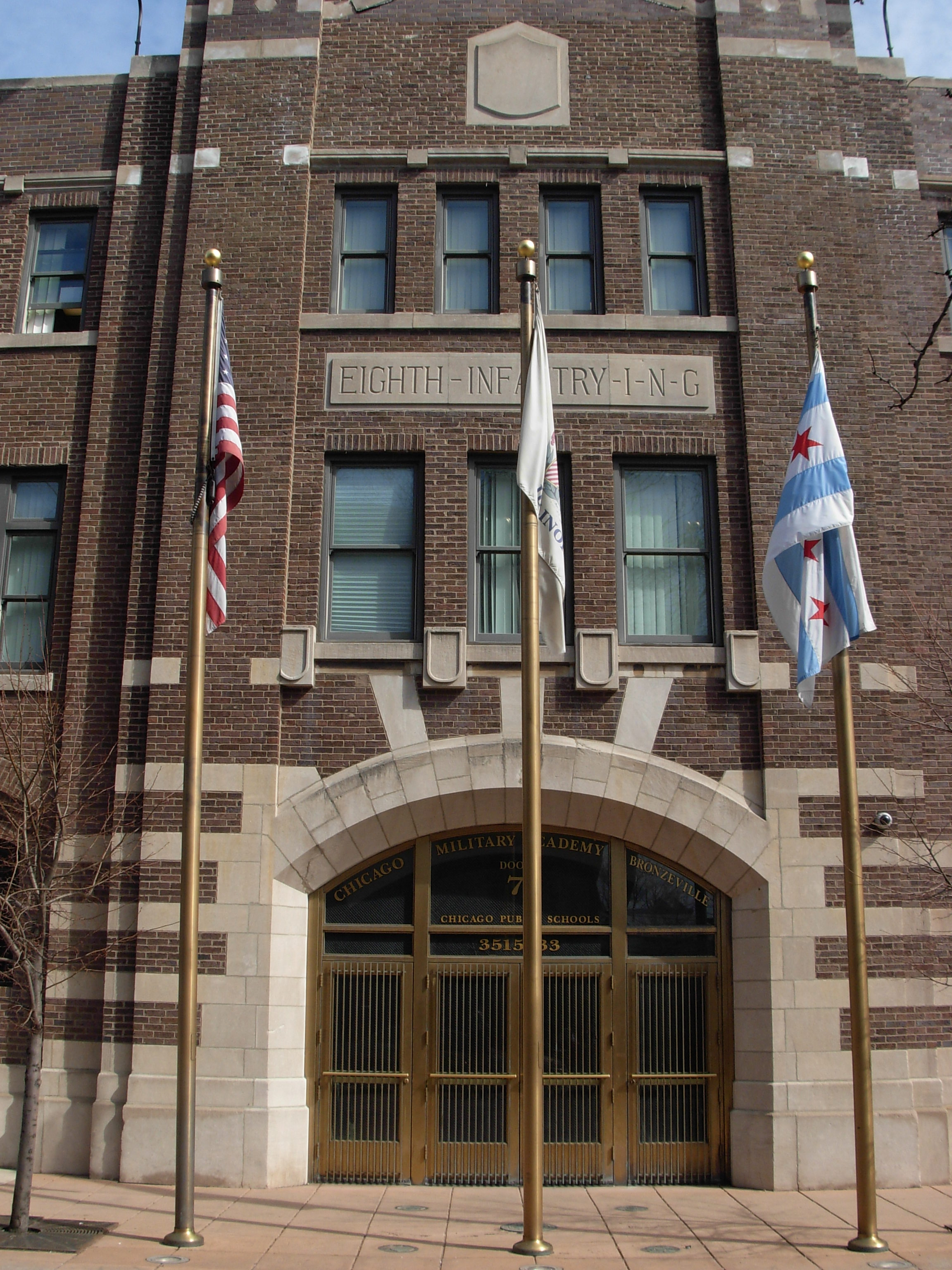
Chicago Eighth Regiment Armory.

The Black Metropolis–Bronzeville District is a historic African-American district in the Bronzeville neighborhood of the Douglas community area on the South Side of Chicago, Illinois.

The neighborhood encompasses the land between the Dan Ryan Expressway to the west, Martin Luther King Jr. Drive to the east, 31st Street to the north, and Pershing Road (39th street) to the south.

The Bronzeville–Black Metropolis National Heritage Area was established in the National Heritage Area Act in 2023. Legislation was passed by Congress in December 2022, setting the tone for President Joe Biden to sign the National Heritage Area Act (Public Law 117-339) into law on January 5, 2023. Up to $10 million in federal funding was designated to support preservation efforts over the course of 15 years. The National Heritage Area will help preserve more than 200 locations in the neighborhood between 18th and 71st Streets.

== Description ==
The historic district includes nine structures that were accorded the Chicago Landmark designation on September 9, 1998. These buildings are:

- Overton Hygienic Building
- Chicago Bee Building
- Wabash Avenue YMCA
- Chicago Defender Building
- Unity Hall
- Eighth Regiment Armory
- Sunset Cafe
- Victory Monument
- Supreme Life Building.

Six of the nine were already individually listed on the National Register of Historic Places−NRHP as a multiple property submission, on 30 April 30, 1986. These are the Overton Hygienic Building, Chicago Bee Building, Wabash Avenue YMCA, Unity Hall, Eighth Regiment Armory, and Victory Monument. However, the Black Metropolis–Bronzeville District is not an NRHP-listed historic district.

The South Side Community Art Center is also now a designated Chicago Landmark in the district.

== Negro History Week & the Origins of Black History Month ==
Originally Negro History Week, the celebration has had multiple iterations.

On September 9, 1915, Woodson met with A.L. Jackson and three others at the Wabash Avenue YMCA to form the Association for the Study of Negro Life and History (ASNLH). The following year, Dr. Woodson released The Journal of Negro History. In 1924, with the involvement of his Omega Psi Phi fraternity brothers, Negro History and Literature Week was born. Eventually, it would be renamed Negro Achievement Week.

Carter G. Woodson originally launched Negro History Week on February 7, 1926 at the Wabash Avenue YMCA located at 3763 South Wabash Avenue. Woodson (whose namesake branch of the Chicago Public Library sits at 95th and Halsted) chose February in an effort to commemorate the lives and legacies of Frederick Douglass and Abraham Lincoln alongside the broader arc of the journey of people of African descent in what became the United States.

In 2026, many communities and organizations will commemorate the centennial of the national iteration of Black History Month. Among those will be the National Museum of African American History and Culture, whose programming with include their Journey of Black History Month Digital Toolkit.

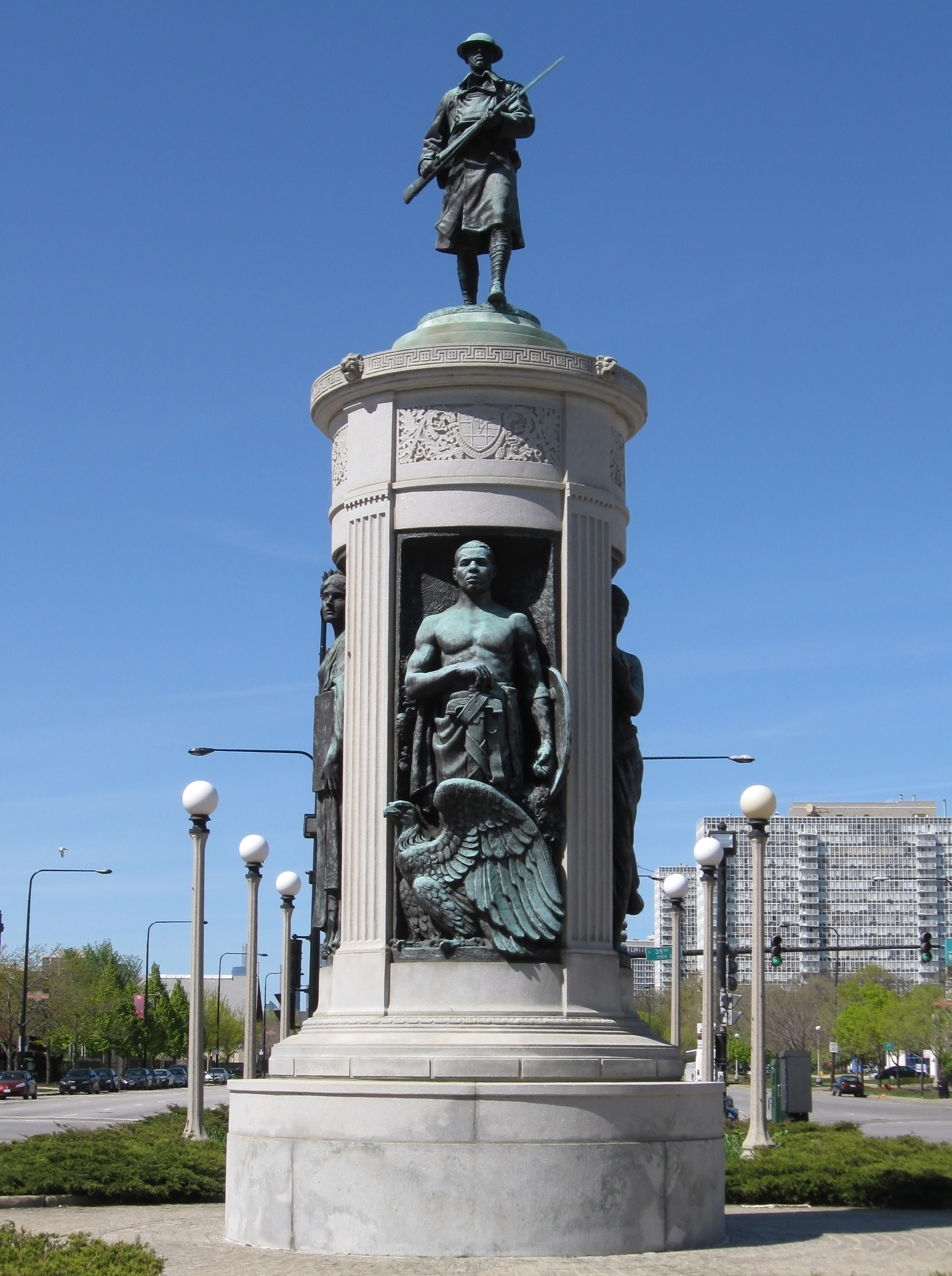
Victory Monument.

== See also ==
- Black Metropolis
- Bronzeville (Douglas, Chicago)
- National Register of Historic Places listings in South Side Chicago
- Pekin Theatre
