= Anthony Overton =

American businessman (1865–1946)

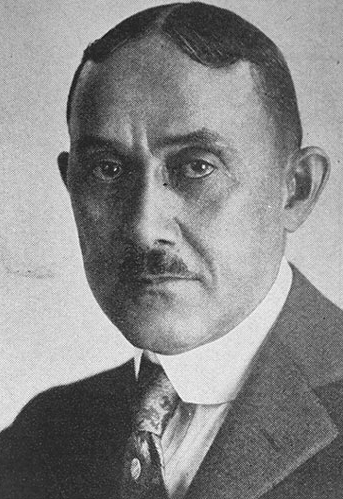
- Born: March 21, 1865
- Died: July 2, 1946 (aged 81)

Anthony Overton Jr. (March 18, 1864 – July 2, 1946), was an American banker and manufacturer. He was the first African American to lead a major business conglomerate.

Overton owned Overton Hygienic Company, a successful home product and cosmetics firm. His publications included Half Century Magazine and then the Chicago Bee. He also owned the Great Northern Realty Company, and the Victory Life Insurance Company.

== Early years ==
Anthony Overton, the son of Anthony and Martha DeBerry Overton, was born in Monroe, Louisiana. There his father operated a grocery and was elected to the Louisiana legislature, serving between 1871 and 1874. At some point before 1880, his family moved from Louisiana to Topeka, Kansas. His father had been born into slavery, and was among the slaves emancipated by Abraham Lincoln. His father ultimately became a small business owner, and made sure young Anthony had greater opportunities. Anthony attended Washburn College in Topeka, and after graduating with a degree in Chemistry, he studied law, earning his legal degree from the University of Kansas School of Law in 1888. He briefly worked as a lawyer, and became a judge in Shawnee, Kansas.

== Business career ==
In 1898, Overton established the Hygienic Manufacturing Company, which produced goods for drug stores and groceries. The products included High Brown Face Powder, which was "the first market success in the sale of cosmetics for black women". In 1911, he moved his business from Kansas to Chicago. Overton also opened a grocery store in Kansas City, Kansas by the late 1890s.

In 1916 he established Half-Century Magazine. In 1923 he established the Douglass National Bank, the second nationally chartered black-owned bank in the United States. He went on to develop a highly diverse conglomerate, including the Great Northern Realty Company, and the Victory Life Insurance Company. In 1925, he founded the Chicago Bee, a black newspaper known for its support of liberal causes. The newspaper was unusual because one of its managing editors was a woman, Olive M. Diggs. In 1927 The National Association for the Advancement of Colored People (NAACP) awarded him its Spingarn Medal for outstanding achievement by an African American. That same year, he was also given the prestigious Harmon award's first award and Gold medal in Business. He was a member of Alpha Phi Alpha fraternity. In addition, there is an elementary school in Chicago that is named after him.

After Overton's death in 1946, the Bee was briefly continued by his sons in a tabloid format. It folded in 1947.

== See also ==
- African-American business history
