= Half-Century Magazine =

Magazine for African Americans, published 1916–1925

Half-Century Magazine was published from 1916 to 1925 for an African-American audience. It was named for the 50th anniversary of the Emancipation Proclamation. The magazine included fashion advice. Anthony Overton founded the magazine. Despite Overton's role, Katherine E. Williams, who became Katherine Williams-Irvin, was listed as its owner and editor-in-chief. Overton advertised his company's beauty products line in the magazine. It was originally aimed at an audience of both women and men, but shifted its aim to women around 1918.
