= Bob Balaban =

American actor (born 1945)

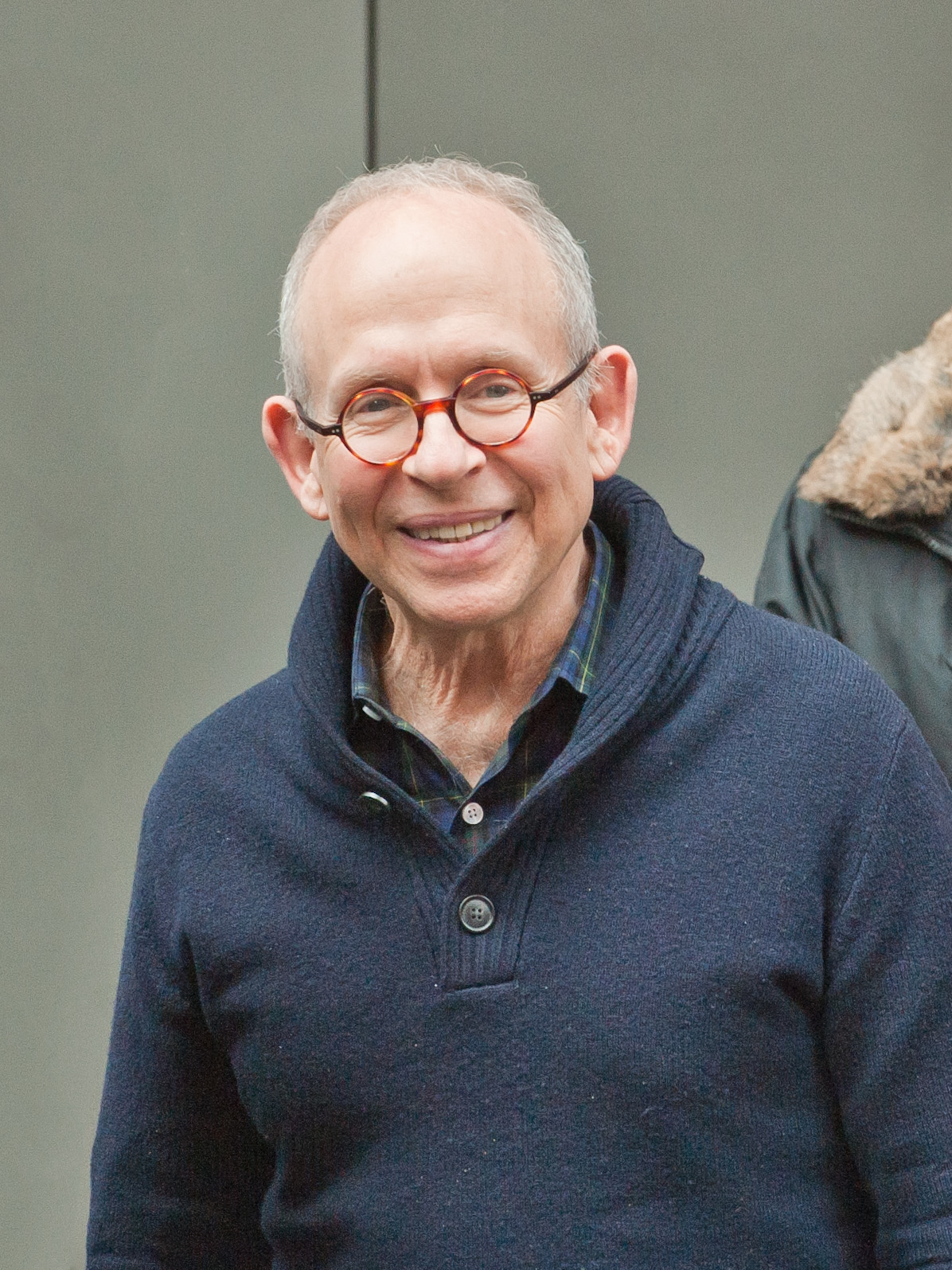
- Balaban in 2014
- Born: Robert Elmer Balaban; August 16, 1945 (age 81); Chicago, Illinois, U.S.
- Education: New York University
- Occupations: Actor; director; producer; author
- Years active: 1965–present
- Spouse: Lynn Grossman (m. 1977)
- Children: 2
- Parents: Eleanor Pottasch Balaban; Elmer Balaban
- Family: Barney Balaban (uncle); A. J. Balaban (uncle); Burt Balaban (cousin); Red Balaban (cousin); Judy Balaban (cousin)

Robert Elmer Balaban (born August 16, 1945) is an American actor and filmmaker. Aside from his acting career, Balaban has directed three feature films, in addition to numerous television episodes and films, and was one of the producers nominated for the Academy Award for Best Picture for Gosford Park (2001), in which he also appeared. He is also an author of children's novels.

Balaban has appeared in the Christopher Guest comedies Waiting for Guffman (1996), Best in Show (2000), A Mighty Wind (2003), and For Your Consideration (2006) and in the Wes Anderson films Moonrise Kingdom (2012), The Grand Budapest Hotel (2014), Isle of Dogs (2018), The French Dispatch (2021), and Asteroid City (2023). Balaban's other film roles include the drama Midnight Cowboy (1969); the science fiction films Close Encounters of the Third Kind (1977), Altered States (1980), 2010 (1984), the comedy Deconstructing Harry (1997), and the historical drama Capote (2005).

== Early life ==
Balaban was born to a Jewish family on August 16, 1945, in Chicago, the son of Eleanor (née Pottasch) and Elmer Balaban, who owned several movie theatres and later was a pioneer in cable television. His mother acted under the name Eleanor Barry. His paternal grandparents emigrated from Moldova and Ukraine to Chicago, while his mother's family was from Germany, Russia, and Romania.

His uncles were dominant forces in the theatre business; they founded the Balaban and Katz Theatre circuit in Chicago, a chain which included the Chicago and Uptown Theatres. Balaban's father, Elmer, and uncle, Harry, founded the H & E Balaban Corporation in Chicago, which operated its own movie palaces, including the Esquire Theatre in Chicago. They later owned a powerful group of television stations and cable television franchises. His uncle Barney Balaban was president of Paramount Pictures for nearly 30 years from 1936 to 1964. His maternal grandmother's second husband, Sam Katz, was a vice president at Metro-Goldwyn-Mayer beginning in 1936. Sam had been an early partner of Balaban's uncles Abe, Barney, John, and Max in forming Balaban and Katz. Sam served as president of the Publix theatre division of Paramount Pictures.

Balaban began his college career at Colgate University where he joined Phi Kappa Tau fraternity before transferring to New York University. He studied acting at HB Studio under Uta Hagen. By 1972, Balaban was a few credits shy of graduation, and he eventually completed his degree by writing a 100-page paper on the sociology of the Close Encounters of the Third Kind film set.

== Career ==
Balaban's first notable role was on stage; he originated the role of Linus in the original off-Broadway production of You're A Good Man, Charlie Brown in 1967. One of his earliest appearances in film was a small role in Midnight Cowboy (1969).

In the 1970s, he appeared as Grady Garrett on an episode of Room 222, Orr in Catch-22, Elliot the Organizer in The Strawberry Statement, and the interpreter David Laughlin in the 1977 Steven Spielberg science fiction film Close Encounters of the Third Kind. In 1979, he received a Tony Award nomination for his role in The Inspector General. During the 1980s he appeared in films including Ken Russell's Altered States (1980) and the 1984 2001: A Space Odyssey sequel 2010 (as Dr. Chandra, the creator of HAL 9000). He also directed the Randy Quaid horror film Parents, and the Armin Mueller-Stahl drama film The Last Good Time (1994).

Balaban had supporting roles in films such as Absence of Malice, Bob Roberts, Deconstructing Harry, Ghost World, The Majestic, Lady in the Water, and Christopher Guest's Waiting for Guffman, Best in Show, A Mighty Wind, and For Your Consideration.

He appeared on television in Miami Vice as reporter Ira Stone. In 1999, Balaban made a guest appearance in the sitcom Friends as Phoebe Buffay's father Frank in "The One with Joey's Bag". In 1992, he had a recurring role on the fourth season of Seinfeld as Russell Dalrymple, a fictional NBC executive partially based on real NBC executive Warren Littlefield. Balaban went on to play Littlefield himself in The Late Shift, a 1996 television movie about the battle between Jay Leno and David Letterman for NBC's The Tonight Show. In 2012, Balaban voiced the audiobook version of Warren Littlefield's autobiography, Top of the Rock: Inside the Rise and Fall of Must See TV.

Balaban co-produced Gosford Park (2001), for which he received an Academy Award nomination for Best Picture. He also appeared in the movie as Morris Weissman, a Hollywood producer. In 2006, he directed the film Bernard and Doris, starring Susan Sarandon. The following year, he made a guest appearance in an episode of Entourage as a doctor known for writing prescriptions for medical marijuana. Balaban directed the 2009 biopic Georgia O'Keeffe, starring Joan Allen and Jeremy Irons. In 2010, he appeared as Judge Clayton Horn, the real-life judge who presided over the obscenity trial of Lawrence Ferlinghetti and City Lights Bookstore in the movie Howl.

Alongside Morgan Freeman and John Lithgow, Balaban appeared onstage in September 2011 as Judge Vaughn Walker in the Broadway debut of the play 8, which depicts the federal trial that overturned California's Prop 8 ban on same-sex marriage. The production was held at the Eugene O'Neill Theatre to raise money for the American Foundation for Equal Rights.

In 2012, Balaban directed four episodes of the Showtime series Nurse Jackie.

Balaban performed in the short radio play Milton Bradley by Peter Sagal in January 2016, for Playing on Air, a non-profit organization that "records short plays [for public radio and podcast] written by top playwrights and performed by outstanding actors."

In early 2021, Balaban provided the voice of the narrator in The Simpsons episode "The Dad-Feelings Limited".

=== Writing ===
Balaban wrote a series of six children's novels featuring a bionic dog named McGrowl. He also co-authored Spielberg, Truffaut & Me: An Actor's Diary with Steven Spielberg, originally published as Close Encounters of the Third Kind Diary and The Creature from the Seventh Grade: Sink or Swim (Creature from the Seventh Grade, #2) which Andy Rash illustrated.

== Personal life ==
Balaban is married to Lynn Grossman; they have two daughters. He resides on the Upper West Side of Manhattan. He is a member of the board of the Exoneration Initiative, a charity dedicated to exonerating wrongfully-convicted people in New York.

== Filmography ==
=== Film ===
Year	Title	Role	Notes
1969	Midnight Cowboy	The Young Student – New York	
1969	Me, Natalie	Morris	
1970	The Strawberry Statement	Elliot	
1970	Catch-22	Capt. Orr	
1971	Making It	Wilkie	
1974	Bank Shot	Victor Karp	credited as Robert Balaban
1975	Report to the Commissioner	Joey Egan	credited as Robert Balaban
1977	Close Encounters of the Third Kind	David Laughlin	
1978	Girlfriends	Martin	
1980	Altered States	Arthur Rosenberg	
1981	Prince of the City	Santimassino	
1981	Absence of Malice	Elliott Rosen	
1981	Whose Life Is It Anyway?	Carter Hill	
1984	2010: The Year We Make Contact	Dr. R. Chandra	
1987	End of the Line	Warren Gerber	
1989	Dead Bang	Elliot Webly	
1990	Alice	Sid Moscowitz	
1991	Little Man Tate	Quizmaster	Uncredited
1992	Bob Roberts	Michael Janes	
1993	Amos & Andrew	Dr. R.A. 'Roy' Fink	
1993	For Love or Money	Ed Drinkwater	
1994	Greedy	Edward "Eddie" Ault	
1994	City Slickers II: The Legend of Curly's Gold	Dr. Jeffrey Sanborn	Uncredited
1995	Pie in the Sky	Paul Entamen	
1996	Waiting for Guffman	Lloyd Miller	
1996	Conversation with the Beast	Webster	
1997	Clockwatchers	Milton Lasky	
1997	Deconstructing Harry	Richard	
1999	Cradle Will Rock	Harry Hopkins	
1999	Jakob the Liar	Kowalsky	
1999	Three to Tango	Decker	
2000	Best in Show	Dr. Theodore W. Millbank, III	
2001	The Mexican	Bernie Nayman	
2001	Ghost World	Mr. Coleslaw	
2001	Gosford Park	Morris Weissman	Also producer/writer
2001	The Majestic	Elvin Clyde	
2002	The Tuxedo	Winton Chalmers	Uncredited
2003	A Mighty Wind	Jonathan Steinbloom	
2004	Marie and Bruce	Roger	
2005	Capote	William Shawn	
2005	Trust the Man	Tobey's Therapist	Uncredited
2006	Lady in the Water	Harry Farber	
2006	For Your Consideration	Philip Koontz	
2007	Dedication	Arthur Planck	
2007	License to Wed	Jewelry Store Clerk	Uncredited
2007	No Reservations	Therapist	
2009	Rage	Mr. White	
2010	Howl	Judge Clayton Horn	
2011	Thin Ice	Leonard Dahl	
2011	A Monster in Paris	Inspector Pâté	Voice only
2011	The Five Stages of Grief	Daniel's Father	Voice only
2012	Moonrise Kingdom	Narrator	
2012	Girl Most Likely	Mr. Duncan	
2013	Fading Gigolo	Sol	
2014	The Monuments Men	Pvt. Preston Savitz	
2014	The Grand Budapest Hotel	M. Martin	
2015	Hitchcock/Truffaut	Narrator	
2016	Mascots	Sol Lumpkin	
2016	I Am the Pretty Thing That Lives in the House	Mr. Waxcap	
2018	Isle of Dogs	King	Voice only
2018	An L.A. Minute	Shelly	
2021	The French Dispatch	Uncle Nick	
2023	80 for Brady	Mark	
2023	Asteroid City	Larkings Executive	
2025	Fantasy Life	Lenny	

=== Television ===
Year	Title	Role	Notes
1965	Hank	Harvey	Episode: "Will The Real Harvey Wheatley Please Stand Up?"
1969	Room 222	Grady Garrett	Episode: "Father & Sons"
1971	Love, American Style	Nick	Episode: "Love and the Fuzz"
1971–1972	The Mod Squad	Walter / Tony	2 episodes
1976	Maude	Ambrose Riley	Episode: "Maude's Ex-Convict"
1985–1986	Miami Vice	Ira Stone	2 episodes
1987	Amazing Stories	Jo-Jo Gillespie	Episode: "Gershwin's Trunk"
1990	The Face of Fear	Ira Preduski	Television movie
1992–1993	Seinfeld	Russell Dalrymple	5 episodes
1995	Legend	Harry Parver	2 episodes
1996	The Late Shift	Warren Littlefield	Television movie
1998	Friends	Frank Buffay Sr.	Episode: "The One with Joey's Bag"
1999	Swing Vote	Justice Eli MacCorckle	Television movie
1999	Dr. Katz, Professional Therapist	Himself (voice)	Episode: "Expert Witness"
2000	The West Wing	Ted Marcus	Episode: "20 Hours in L.A."
2000	Now and Again	Frederick Lizzard	Episode: "Lizzard's Tale"
2002	The Education of Max Bickford	Dr. Lowell Sherman	Episode: "I Never Schlunged My Father"
2006	Tom Goes to the Mayor	Walt Pickle (voice)	Episode: "The Layover"
2007	Entourage	Doctor	Episode: "The Dream Team"
2008	Recount	Ben Ginsberg	Television movie
2011	Web Therapy	Ted Mitchell	Episode: "Shrink Rap"
2011–2012	The Good Wife	Gordon Higgs	2 episodes
2013	Muhammad Ali's Greatest Fight	Lawyer	Television movie
2013	Family Tree	Melvin Schmelff / Tumbleweed Tim	Episode: "Cowboys"
2013–2015	Girls	Mr. Rice	3 episodes
2014	Alpha House	Senator Elliot Robeson	2 episodes
2015	Last Week Tonight with John Oliver	Himself	Episode: "Paid Family Leave"
2015	Show Me a Hero	Judge Leonard Burke Sand	4 episodes
2015–2019	Broad City	Arthur Wexler	3 episodes
2016	Last Week Tonight with John Oliver	Crazy Walter	Episode: "Auto Lending"
2016	Pitch	Frank Reid	3 episodes
2016	Graves	Secretary Burns	Episode: "Nothing Can Come From Nothing"
2017	Wormwood	Dr. Harold A. Abramson	4 episodes
2018	Animals	Himself (voice)	2 episodes
2018–2020	Condor	Reuel Abbott	Main cast, 20 episodes
2019	The Politician	Keaton Hobart	Main role
2021	The Simpsons	Narrator (voice)	Episode: "The Dad-Feelings Limited"
2021	Summer Camp Island	Gerald (voice)	Episode: "Hark the Gerald Sings"
2021	The Chair	Elliot Rentz	6 episodes
2021	The Harper House	Buck Mastiff / Frederick (voice)	Episode: "Destination Funeral/Making the Lie Real"
2022	Space Force	Ron (voice)	Episode: "Mad (Buff) Confidence"
2025	Severance	Mark W.	2 episodes
2025	American Dad!	Glen Hanover (voice)	Episode: "Oh Brothel, Where Art Thou?"

=== Director ===
Year	Title	Notes
1983	Tales from the Darkside	Episode: "Trick or Treat (Pilot)"
1983	The Brass Ring	Television movie
1985	Amazing Stories	Episode: "Fine Tuning"
1987	Invisible Thread	Television movie
1989	Parents	
1991–1992	Eerie, Indiana	3 episodes
1993	My Boyfriend's Back	
1994	The Last Good Time	
1995	Legend	Episode: "Revenge of the Herd"
1997	Subway Stories: Tales from the Underground	Television movie; segment: "The 5:24"
1998	Oz	Episode: "Great Men"
1999	Strangers with Candy	Episode: "Jerri Is Only Skin Deep"
2000	Now and Again	Episode: "Lizzard's Tale"
2000	Deadline	Episode: "Perception"
2001	Dead Last	2 episodes
2002–2003	The Twilight Zone	2 episodes
2005	The Exonerated	Television movie
2008	Bernard and Doris	Television movie
2008	Swingtown	Episode: "Go Your Own Way"
2009	Georgia O'Keeffe	Television movie
2011–2012	Nurse Jackie	4 episodes
2013–2014	Alpha House	3 episodes
2016	Graves	2 episodes

=== Theatre ===
Year	Title	Role	Venue	Ref.
1967	You're a Good Man, Charlie Brown	Linus van Pelt	Theatre 80, Off-Broadway	
1968	Plaza Suite	Borden Eisler/Bellhop	Plymouth Theatre, Broadway	
1977	Some of My Best Friends	Lawrence Mumford	Longacre Theatre, Broadway	
1978	The Inspector General	Óssip	Circle in the Square Theatre, Broadway	
1988	Speed-the-Plow	Charlie Fox	Royale Theatre, Broadway	
2011	8	Judge Vaughn Walker	Eugene O'Neill Theatre, Broadway	
2014	A Delicate Balance	Henry	John Golden Theatre, Broadway	

=== Podcasts ===
Year	Title	Role	Notes
2018	Wolverine: The Long Night	Joseph Langrock	

== Awards and nominations ==
Year	Award	Category	Project	Result
2001	Academy Awards	Best Picture	Gosford Park	Nominated
2001	British Academy Film Awards	Outstanding British Film	Gosford Park	Won
2009	Golden Globe Awards	Best Miniseries or Television Film	Bernard and Doris	Nominated
2008	Primetime Emmy Awards	Outstanding Supporting Actor in a Limited Series or Movie	Recount	Nominated
2008	Primetime Emmy Awards	Outstanding Television Movie	Bernard and Doris	Nominated
2008	Primetime Emmy Awards	Outstanding Directing for a Limited Series or Movie	Bernard and Doris	Nominated
2010	Primetime Emmy Awards	Outstanding Directing for a Limited Series or Movie	Georgia O'Keeffe	Nominated
1979	Tony Awards	Best Featured Actor in a Play	The Inspector General	Nominated
2001	Screen Actors Guild Awards	Outstanding Ensemble Cast in a Motion Picture	Gosford Park	Won
2005	Screen Actors Guild Awards	Outstanding Ensemble Cast in a Motion Picture	Capote	Nominated

== Books ==
- Balaban, Bob (1978). Close Encounters of the Third Kind Diary (1st ed.). Paradise Press. ISBN 0931550009. OCLC 4027590.
- Balaban, Bob (2002). Spielberg, Truffaut & Me: Close Encounters of the Third Kind, an Actor's Diary (New ed.). London: Titan Books. ISBN 9781840234305. OCLC 48932708.
