= Elmer Balaban =

American media magnate

- Born: May 1, 1909; Chicago, Illinois, US
- Died: November 2, 2001 (aged 92); Chicago, Illinois, US
- Education: B.A. University of Pennsylvania
- Occupations: Theater owner Cable television executive
- Known for: Founder of H & E Corporation; Founder of Plains Television
- Spouse(s): Elenore Pottasch (m. 19??; died 1987)
- Children: 3, including Bob Balaban
- Family: Barney Balaban (brother); A. J. Balaban (brother); Burt Balaban (nephew); Judith Rose Balaban (niece); Leonard "Red" Balaban (nephew)

Elmer Balaban (May 1, 1909 – November 2, 2001) was an American theater owner and early cable television provider.

== Biography ==
Balaban was born to a Jewish family, the youngest child of Bessarabian Jewish immigrants Augusta "Goldie" (née Mandebursky, later Levin) from Odesa and Israel Balaban, from Tiraspol. His siblings in order were Barney, A.J., sister Ida, John, Max, Dave, and Harry. Balaban's parents owned a grocery store on Maxwell Street in Chicago where his father often extended credit to people.

The family decided to get into the movie theater business after his mother returned home from seeing her first picture show and commented, "Boys, that's the business you ought to get into. It's a great business. Why think of it -- people paying money before they even know what they were going to get!". The five eldest brothers and their brother-in-law, Sam Katz (married to sister Ida), pooled their money and leased the Kedzie Theater; although the theater at the time consisted of a bunch of loose chairs and a sheet for a screen, they still employed a violinist to give an aura of class. Their venture was successful and they reinvested their profits and built the 700-seat Circle Theater which featured a pipe organ, a four-piece orchestra, and booked popular vaudeville performers such as the Marx Brothers, Eddie Cantor, and Jack Benny. In 1917, they built the 2,000-seat Central Park Theater which was one of the first theaters to have a mezzanine and a balcony. They soon owned dozens of theaters that were differentiated for their ornateness and size and included their flagship theater, the Esquire Theater. His family sent Elmer to the Wharton School at the University of Pennsylvania to acquire business management skills. In 1925, the Balaban and Katz Corporation was incorporated.

After his brother Barney Balaban went on to become the president of Paramount Pictures and brother-in-law Sam Katz left the company to become head of production at Metro-Goldwyn-Mayer (MGM), Elmer took over the company. Soon after, in 1926, Famous Players–Lasky Corporation, the forerunner of Paramount Pictures, bought a controlling interest in the Balaban and Katz. Taking his share of the sale, Elmer went on to found his own theater company with his brother Harry, the H & E Corporation (named after Harry and Elmer). They differentiated their offerings by showing both Hollywood blockbusters as well as films from independent and foreign studios; the firm eventually grew to 125 movie theaters.

In the mid-1950s, Balaban sold the movie theaters and used the profits to purchase some 45 television and radio stations mostly in Dallas, St. Louis, and Hartford. Balaban developed an early version of pay television where people would feed quarters into a box on top of a television which would show movies. Although the experiment did not succeed, it led Balaban to invest in cable television and he founded Plains Television which became one of the largest early cable providers by focusing on expanding television to under-served rural areas in the South and Midwest.

Upon his retirement, his brother Barney asked him if he wanted to succeed him as head of Paramount; Elmer turned him down as he wanted to stay in Chicago.

== Personal life ==
Balaban was married to actress Elenore Pottasch. They had three children: Nancy Balaban Magidson, Bob Balaban, and Susan Balaban Flaxman. Balaban died on November 2, 2001, in his hometown in Chicago, Illinois. His wife acted under the name Eleanor Barry.
