= Eddie Condon's =

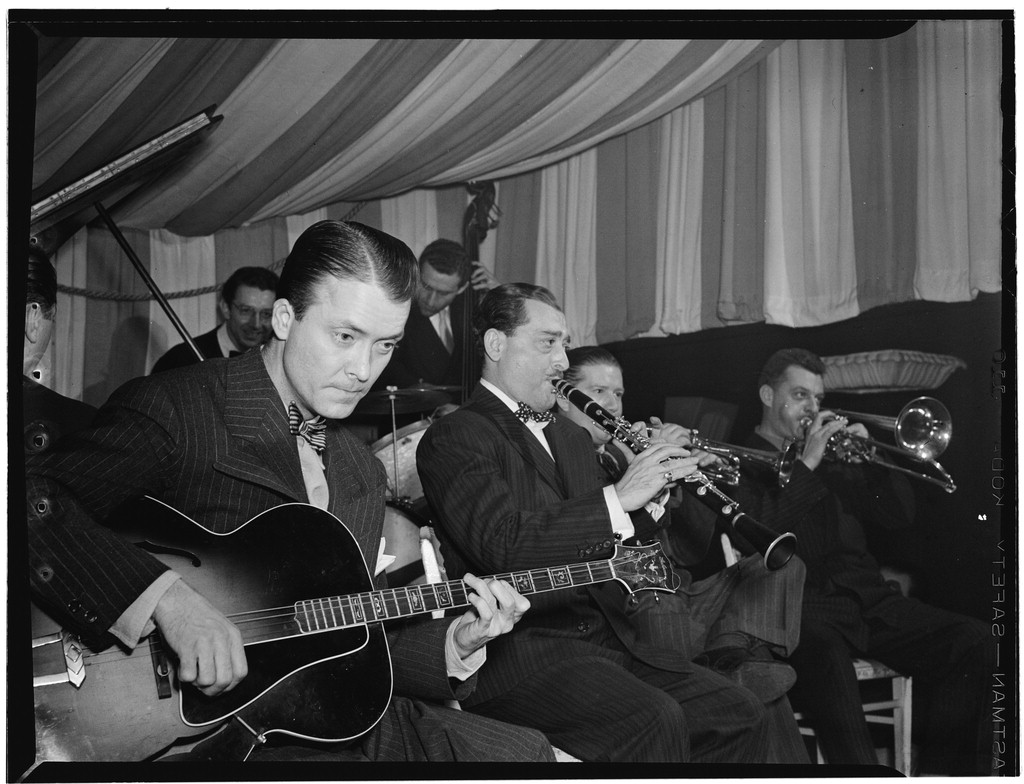
Eddie Condon, Tony Parenti, Wild Bill Davison, Brad Gowans, Jack Lesberg, and Freddie Ohms at Eddie Condon's of New York City in June 1946

Eddie Condon's was the name of three successive jazz venues in New York run by jazz banjoist, guitarist, and bandleader Eddie Condon from 1945 until the mid-1980s. In 1975, Red Balaban took over the management of the club. Ed Polcer was also a part-owner at the time of the club's closing.

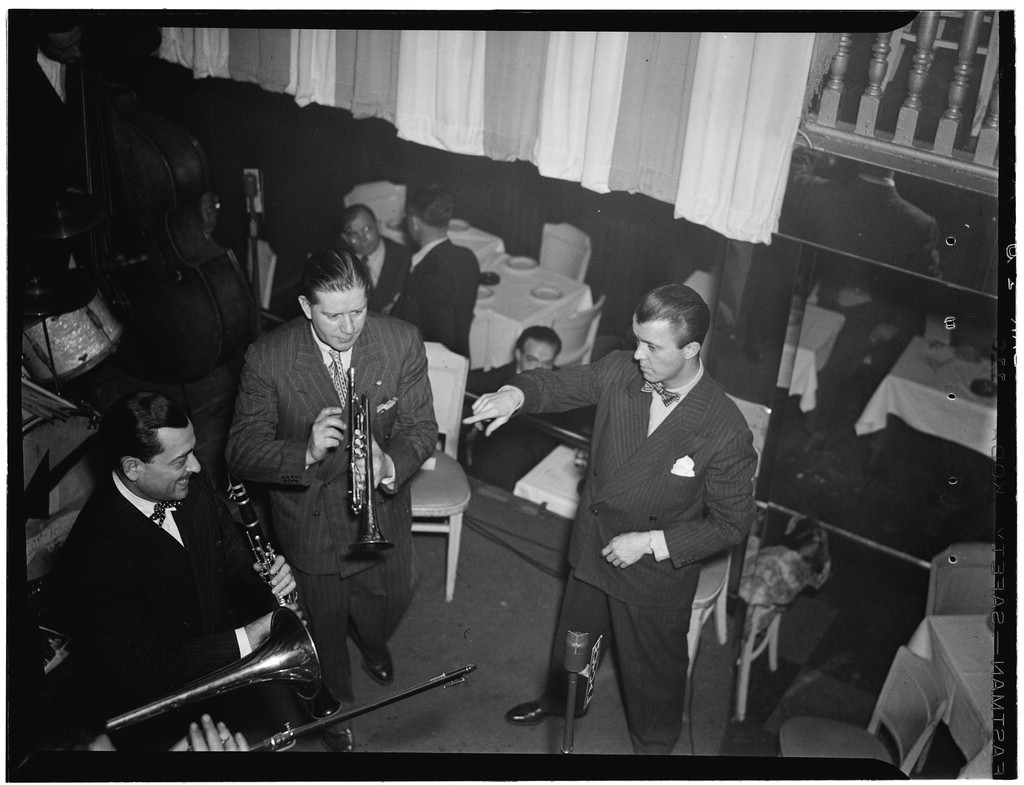
Tony Parenti, Wild Bill Davison, and Eddie Condon take a break at Eddie Condon's of New York City in June 1946

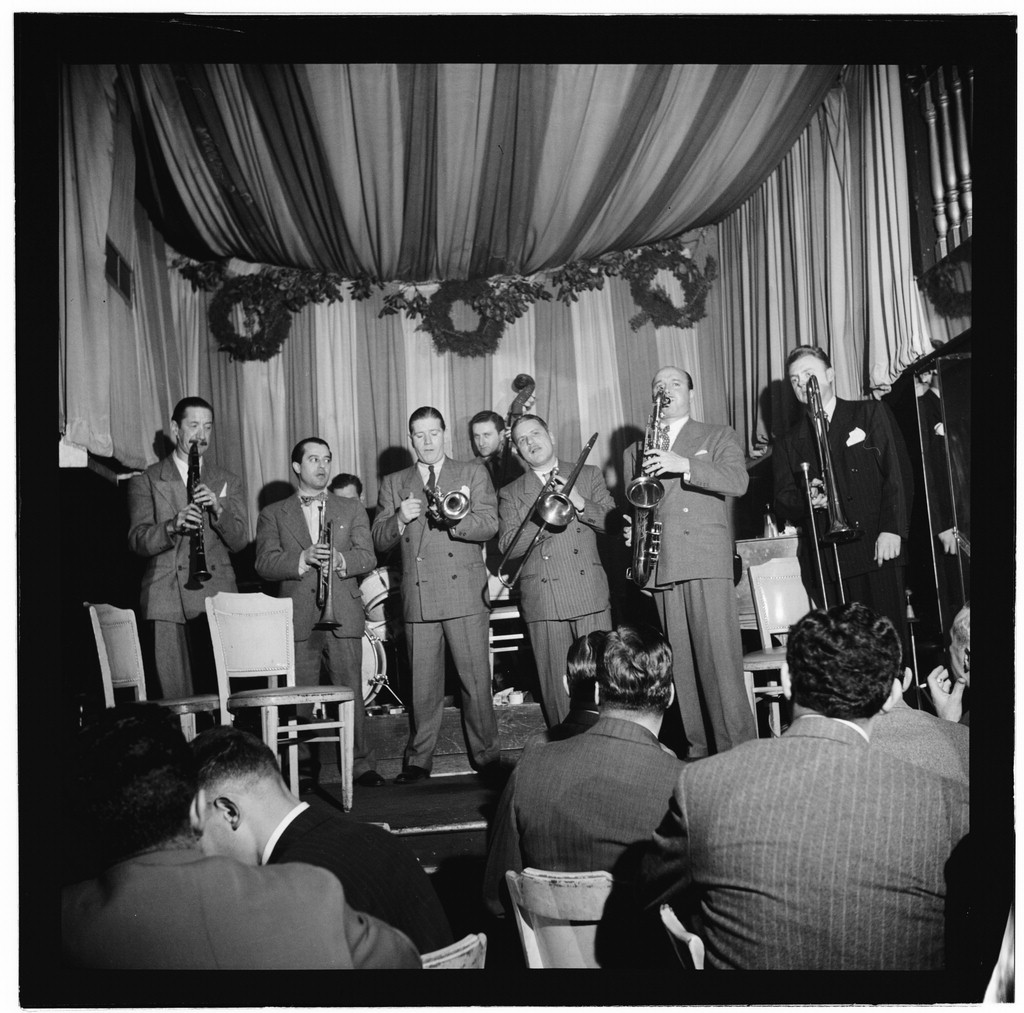
Pee Wee Russell, Max Kaminsky, Wild Bill Davison, Jack Lesberg, George Brunies, Bud Freeman, and Freddie Ohms at Eddie Condon's of New York City between 1946 and 1948

The first venue was located on West 3rd Street in Greenwich Village. The club then moved to 52nd Street near Sixth Avenue, the present site of the CBS headquarters building, The final venue was on the south side of East 54th Street, east of Second Avenue.

== House bands/musicians ==
- 1947–1951: drummer Buzzy Drootin
- 1948–1956: pianist Ralph Sutton
- 1957: pianist Johnny Varro
- Cornetist Ed Polcer led the last house band.

== Live recordings at Condon's ==
- 1954: Ringside at Condon's (Savoy Jazz) – Wild Bill Davison, Eddie Condon, Edmond Hall and others
- 1955: Midnight at Condon's – Bud Freeman's All Star Orchestra (Mercury/EmArcy)
- Jammin' at Condon's – Eddie Condon and His All-Stars (Columbia)
- 1956: A Night at Eddie Condon's – Eddie Condon and His Orchestra (Decca)
- Night at the New Eddie Condon's – Red Balaban & Cats
