= Fame Is the Name of the Game =

- Genre: Mystery fiction
- Based on: One Woman (1933) by Tiffany Thayer
- Screenplay by: Ranald MacDougall
- Directed by: Stuart Rosenberg
- Starring: Tony Franciosa; Jack Klugman; Susan Saint James; Robert Duvall
- Theme music composer: Benny Carter
- Country of origin: United States
- Original language: English

Production
- Producer: Ranald MacDougall
- Cinematography: John F. Warren
- Editor: Edward W. Williams
- Running time: 100 minutes
- Production company: Universal TV

Original release
- Network: NBC
- Release: November 26, 1966

Related
- The Name of the Game

Fame Is the Name of the Game is a 1966 American made-for-television drama film starring Tony Franciosa that aired on NBC and served as the pilot episode of the subsequent series The Name of the Game. It was directed by Stuart Rosenberg and was produced by Ranald MacDougall, who also wrote the teleplay, from the 1933 novel One Woman by Tiffany Thayer, previously adapted for Chicago Deadline (1949).

The film stars Tony Franciosa as investigative journalist Jeff Dillon and also presents the screen debut of 20-year-old Susan Saint James as Peggy Chan, Dillon's new editorial assistant. (In the series, Saint James's character is renamed Peggy Maxwell, and she is the research assistant to all three of the rotating lead characters.) In the film, Jeff Dillon writes for Fame magazine, a publication of Janus Enterprises, and Glenn Howard (George Macready) is just the managing editor. In the subsequent series, Dillon writes for People magazine, a division of Howard Publications, and Glenn Howard (Gene Barry) is head of the whole company.

The telefilm also features Jill St. John, Jack Klugman, and Robert Duvall.

== Plot ==
An investigative reporter looks into the murder of a call girl. His investigation unearths her address book, which contains the names and numbers of many prominent people. He sets out to find her killer from among the names contained in the address book.

== Cast ==
- Tony Franciosa as Jeff Dillon
- Jill St. John as Leona Purdy
- Jack Klugman as Ben Welcome
- George Macready as Glenn Howard (replaced by Gene Barry in the subsequent series)
- Jack Weston as Griffin
- Susan Saint James as Peggy Chan (Peggy Maxwell in the series)
- Lee Bowman as Cruikshank
- Robert Duvall as Eddie Franchot
- Jay C. Flippen as Dizzy Shaner
- Nicholas Colasanto as Lieutenant Lewis

== Production ==
The film was the first in a series of at least twelve movies made for television by Universal for NBC. The films were budgeted between $750,000 and $1,250,000 and would air on Tuesday and Saturday nights. Some would be pilots for series.

=== Advertising ===
In the weeks before the telefilm's first broadcast, NBC ran an unprecedented blitz of TV ads which erroneously billed Fame is the Name of the Game as television's first "world premiere" of a "major motion picture".

== Reception ==
The Los Angeles Times called it "a slickly produced and directed whudunnit so filled with gimmicks and gals that it really didn't matter who committed the murders or why."

The film received strong ratings of 23 with a 40 share of the audience, leading to the spin-off series.

== See also ==
- Chicago Deadline (1949)
- The Doomsday Flight (1966)
