= Burt Balaban =

American film producer and director (1922–1965)

- Born: March 6, 1922; Chicago, Illinois, U.S.
- Died: October 14, 1965 (aged 43)
- Occupations: Film producer and director
- Years active: 1954–1965
- Family: Bob Balaban (cousin); Leonard "Red" Balaban (brother); Judy Balaban (sister); A. J. Balaban (uncle); Elmer Balaban (uncle)

Burt Balaban (March 6, 1922 – October 14, 1965) was an American film producer and director.

== Biography ==
Balaban was born to a Jewish family, the son of Tillie (née Urkov) from her first marriage, and stepson of Barney Balaban, longtime president of Paramount Pictures. He was the nephew of Elmer Balaban, the nephew of A. J. Balaban, the brother of author Judy Balaban and the cousin of actor Bob Balaban of Close Encounters of the Third Kind (1977) and Gosford Park (2001).

He was born in Chicago and graduated from Roanoke College. During World War II, he was a combat photographer with the Marines.

Shortly after directing and producing The Gentle Rain in 1965, Balaban was diagnosed with cancer and died on October 14, 1965.

== Selected filmography ==
- Phantom Caravan (1954) – executive producer
- The Sergeant and the Spy (TV movie) (1954) (producer)
- Amiable Lady (1954) (TV movie) (producer)
- The Lie (1954) (TV movie) (producer)
- Double Barrel Miracle (1954) (TV movie) – producer
- Stranger from Venus (1954) a.k.a. Immediate Disaster – producer, director
- Diplomatic Passport (1954) – producer
- Eight Witnesses (1954) (TV) – executive producer
- Lady of Vengeance (1957) – producer, director
- High Hell (1958) – producer, director
- Murder, Inc. (1960) – producer, director
- Mad Dog Coll (1961) – director
- The Gentle Rain (1966) – producer, director
