= Chicago Theatre =

Theater in Chicago, Illinois

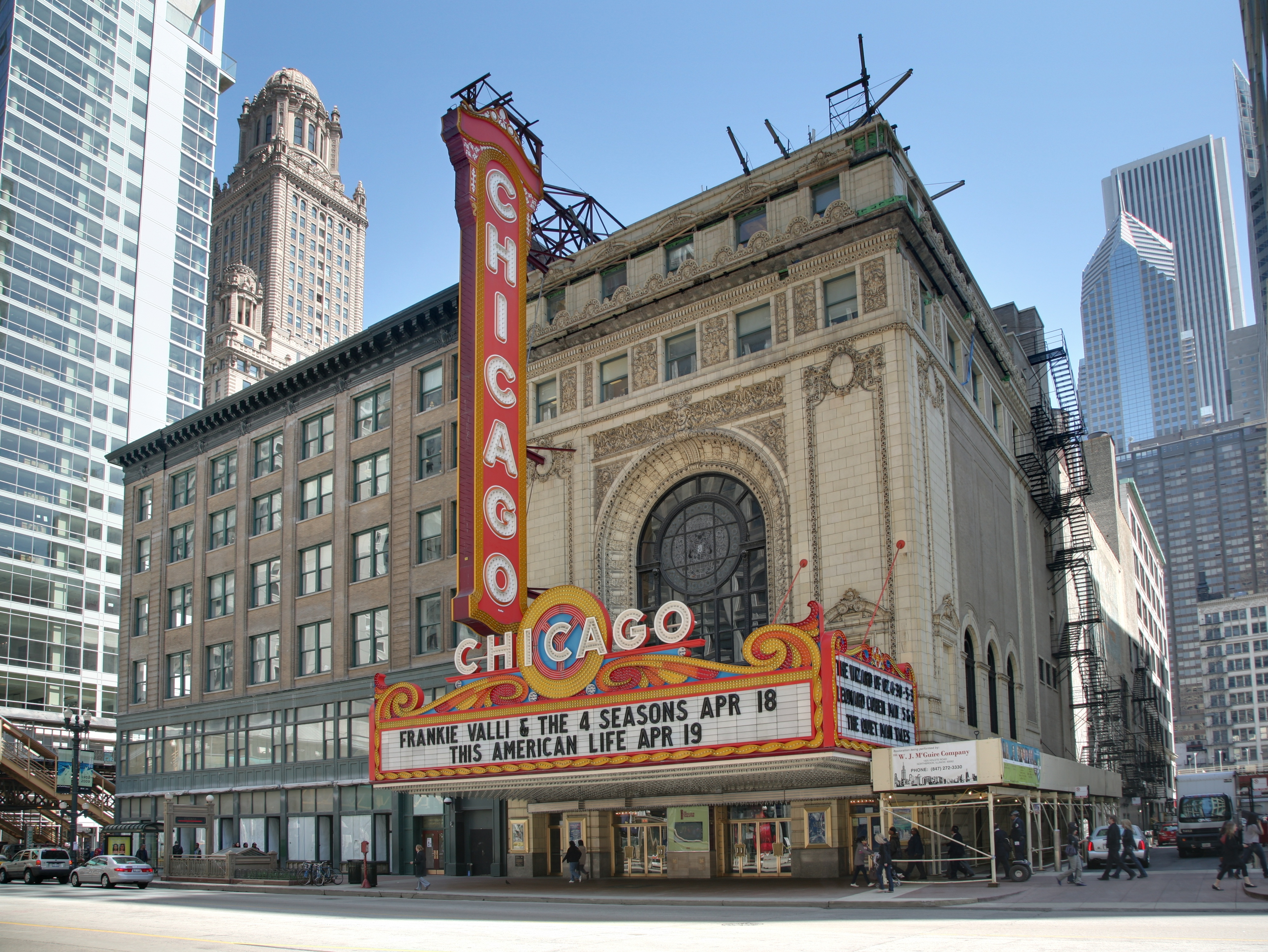
- The Chicago Theatre in April 2009
- Interactive map of Chicago Theatre
- Address: 175 North State Street; Chicago, Illinois; 60601
- Owner: Madison Square Garden Entertainment
- Capacity: 3,600
- Current use: Music venue
- Public transit: Brown Orange Pink Green Purple at State/Lake; Red at Lake

Construction
- Opened: October 26, 1921

Website
- thechicagotheatre.com
- Balaban and Katz Chicago Theatre
- U.S. National Register of Historic Places
- Chicago Landmark
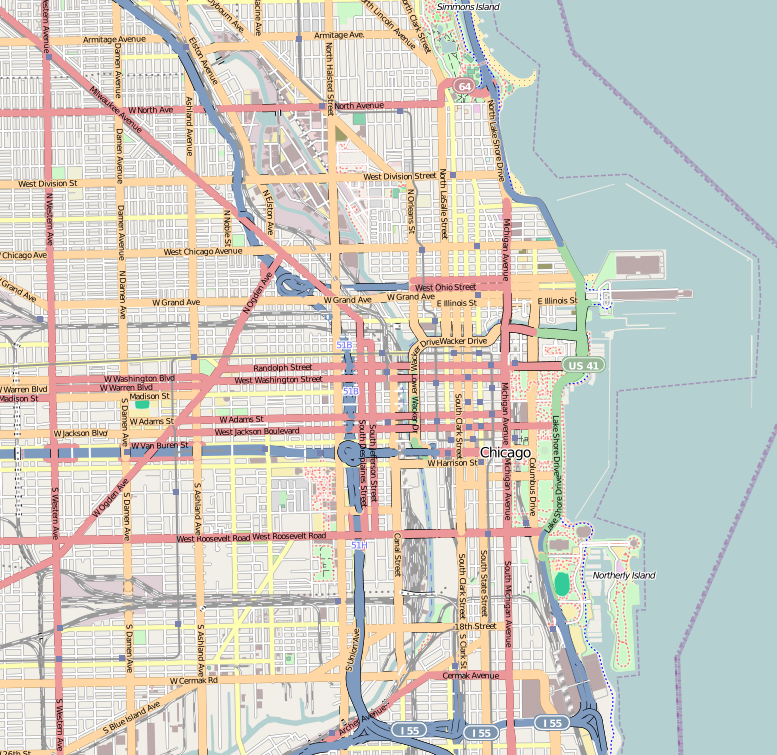
- Location within Central Chicago Location within Illinois Location within the United States
- Coordinates: 41°53′7″N 87°37′40″W
- Area: Less than one acre
- Architect: Rapp & Rapp
- Architectural style: Neo-Baroque/Neoclassical (exterior); French Baroque (Neo-Baroque)(interior)
- NRHP reference No.: 79000822

Significant dates
- Added to NRHP: June 6, 1979
- Designated CHICL: January 28, 1983

The Chicago Theatre, originally known as the Balaban and Katz Chicago Theatre, is a theater on North State Street in the Loop area of Chicago, Illinois. Built in 1921, the Chicago Theatre was the flagship for the Balaban and Katz (B&K) group of theaters run by A. J. Balaban, his brother Barney Balaban and partner Sam Katz. Along with the other B&K theaters, from 1925 to 1945 the Chicago Theatre was a dominant movie theater enterprise. Currently, Madison Square Garden, Inc. owns and operates the Chicago Theatre as a 3600 seat performing arts venue for stage plays, magic shows, comedy, speeches, sporting events and popular music concerts.

The building was added to the National Register of Historic Places on June 6, 1979, and was listed as a Chicago Landmark on January 28, 1983. The distinctive Chicago Theatre marquee, "an unofficial emblem of the city", appears frequently in film, television, artwork, and photography.

== History ==
=== Grand opening, growth, and decline ===
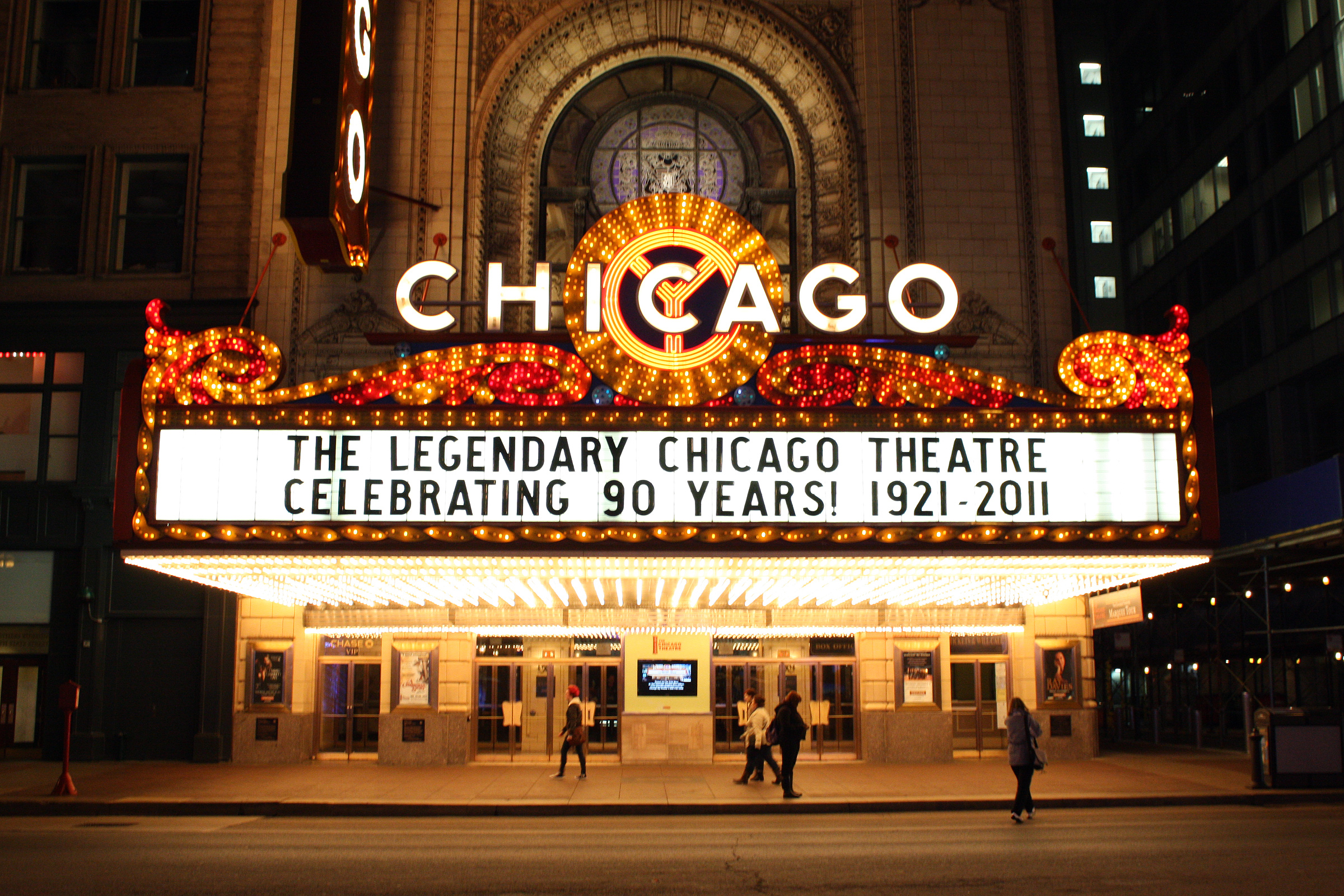
Marquee during the theater's 90th anniversary

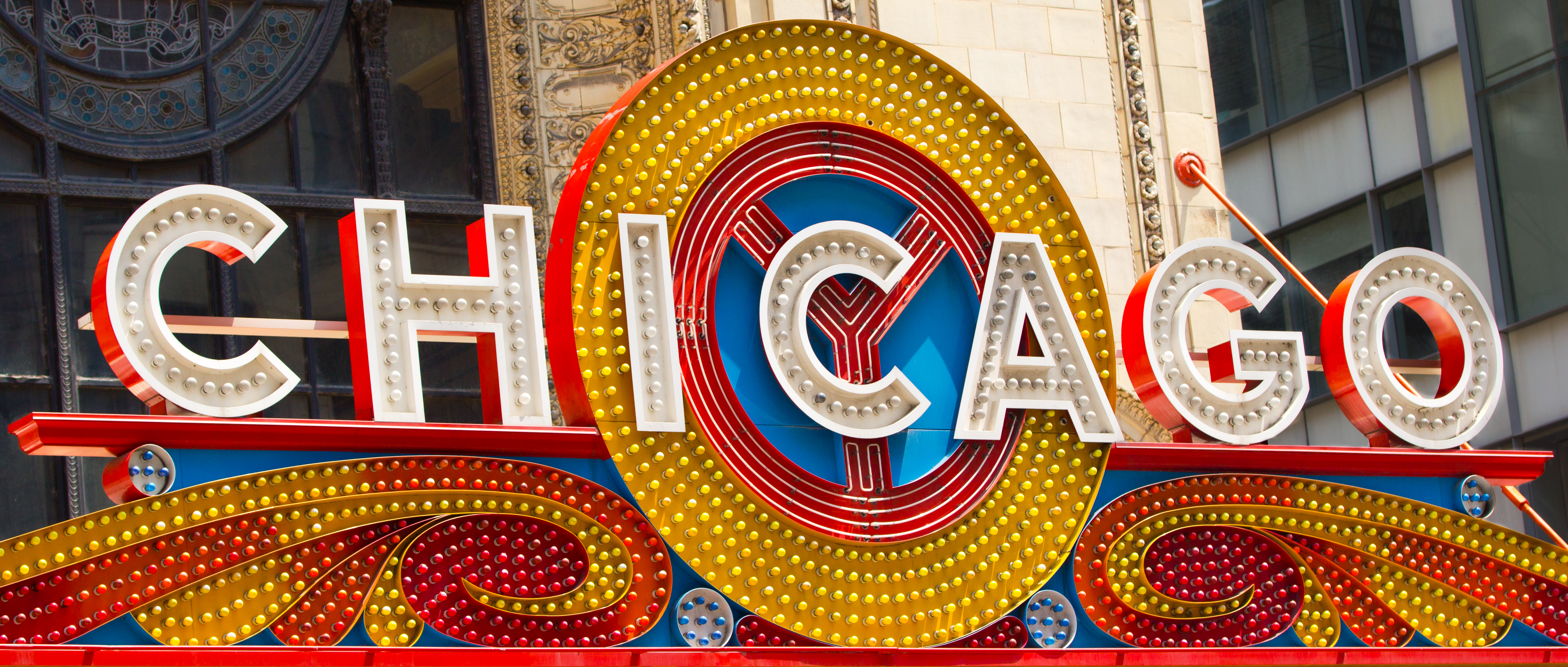
The Y-shaped figure behind the horizontal word Chicago on the State Street marquee is the city's "municipal device," a badge which symbolizes the forked Chicago River at Wolf Point.

Abe and Barney Balaban, together with Sam and Morris Katz—founders of the Balaban and Katz theater chain, built the Chicago Theatre in 1921 as one of a large chain of opulent motion picture houses. The theater would become the flagship for 28 theaters in the city and over 100 others in the Midwestern United States that B&K operated in conjunction with the Paramount Publix chain. Cornelius W. Rapp and George L. Rapp were primary architects and the final construction cost was $4 million ($72.2 million in 2025 dollars). The Rapp brothers also designed many other B&K properties in Chicago, including the Oriental and Uptown Theatres. Preceded by the now-demolished Tivoli Theatre of Chicago and Capitol Theatre of New York City, the Chicago Theatre was the "...largest, most costly and grandest of the super deluxe movie palaces" built up to that date and thus now the oldest surviving grand movie palace. The Chicago Theatre was among the earliest theaters in the nation to be built in Rapp and Rapp's signature Neo-Baroque French-revival style. It is the oldest surviving example of this style in Chicago.

The original 1921 interior decoration of the auditorium included fourteen large romantic French-themed murals surrounding the proscenium by Chicago artist Louis Grell (1887–1960), a common feature that Rapp and Rapp architects included in their movie palace designs.

When it opened October 26, 1921, the 3,880-seat theater was promoted as the "Wonder Theatre of the World". Capacity crowds packed the theater during its opening week for the First National Pictures feature The Sign on the Door starring Norma Talmadge. Other attractions included a 50-piece orchestra, famed organist Jesse Crawford at the 26-rank Wurlitzer theatre organ—"Oh, yes, it was mighty," recalled Orson Welles— and a live stage show. Poet Carl Sandburg, reporting for the Chicago Tribune, wrote that mounted police were required for crowd control. The theater's strategy of enticing movie patrons with a plush environment and top notch service (including the pioneering use of air conditioning) was emulated nationwide.

During its first 40 years of operation, the Chicago Theatre presented premiere films and live entertainment. Throughout its existence, many of the top performers and stars of their day made live appearances at the theater. One of its biggest draws was live jazz, which Balaban and Katz promoted as early as September 1922 in a special event they called "Syncopation Week". This proved so successful that jazz bands became a mainstay of the Chicago Theatre's programming through the 1920s and into the 1930s. In preparation for the 1933 World's Fair in Chicago, the Chicago Theatre was redecorated. Part of the World's Fair renovation included another commission by Balaban & Katz for Grell to repaint the architecturally enclosed fourteen murals. This time Grell chose Greek/Roman deities as the theme for the large oil on canvas murals which are on public exhibit today in the theatre auditorium. The building has been associated with popular culture occasions. For example, Ronald Reagan announced his engagement to Jane Wyman at the theater. Another modernization occurred in the 1950s when management discontinued stage shows.

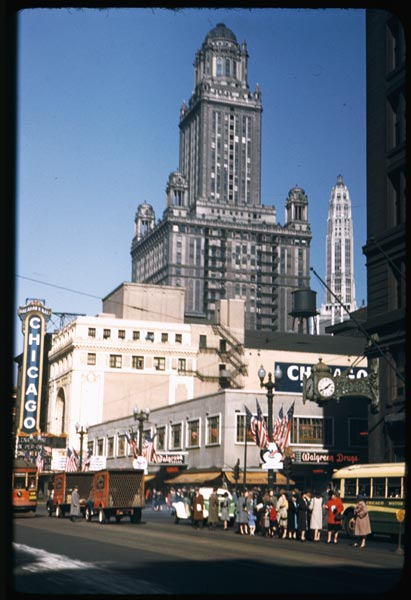
The theater in October 1944 with sign painted blue-gray.

During the economic and social changes of the 1970s, business at the theatre slowed for owner Plitt Theatres, affecting ongoing viability. The Chicago Theatre was re-opened to stage shows in 1983 by Festival's Inc Production Director Lou Volpano who directed the rehab to showcase the theatre's viability with the first shows in forty years that included: Liza Minnelli, grand ballet with Alexander Godunov, Vegas stalwarts Steve Lawrence and Eydie Gormé and Bob Hope, jazz great Sarah Vaughn and many more over two winter weekends. "When I first scouted the location, there were bullet holes in the picture sheet and they were showing 'Shaft', but it was so magnificent a venue I knew it'd be a hit" said producer Volpano. In 1984, the Chicago Theatre Preservation Group purchased the theater and adjoining Page Brothers Building for $11.5 million ($35.6 million today). The group attempted to maintain the venue as a picture theater but was unable to remain viable and the facility closed September 19, 1985. The last known films to play at the theater under its original incarnation were American Ninja and Teen Wolf.

=== Restoration ===
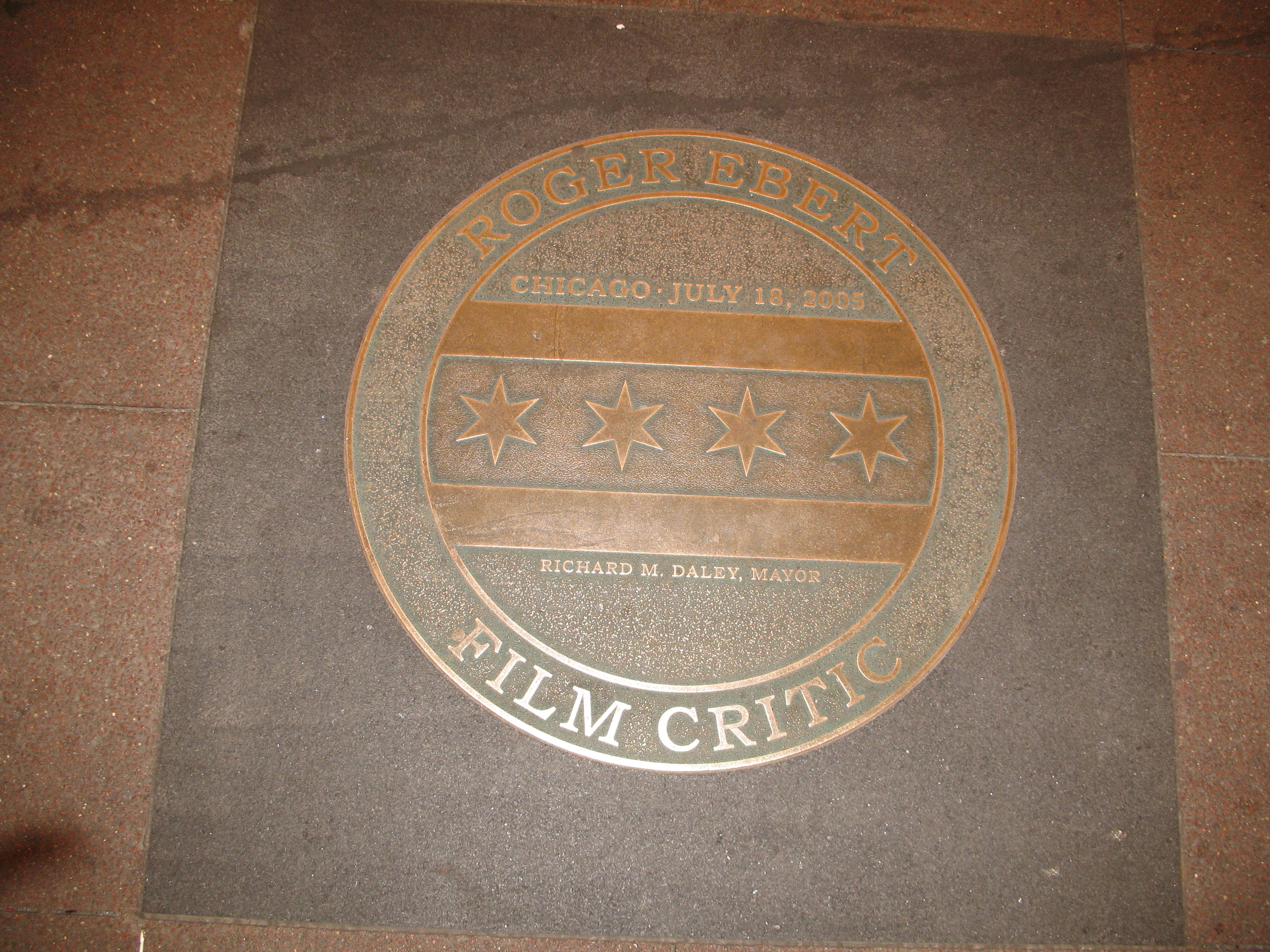
Mayor Daley's Roger Ebert Day award

The Chicago Theatre Preservation Group commenced renovation of the buildings which were completed in 1986 at a cost of $9 million ($26.4 million), with $4.3 million ($12.6 million) spent on the Theatre. The renovation by architects Daniel P. Coffey & Associates, Ltd. and interior design consultants A.T. Heinsbergen & Co. restored the Chicago Theatre to a 1930s appearance and a seating capacity of 3,600. The theatre reopened September 10, 1986, with a performance by Frank Sinatra marking the culmination of a four-year historic preservation effort championed by the Landmarks Preservation Council of Illinois, The gala reopening was also symbolic because Sinatra had performed at the theater in the 1950s. The restoration of the adjoining Page Building, itself a Chicago and National Register landmark, provided office space to support the theatre. The theater, like its neighbor the Joffrey Tower, is an important component of the North Loop/Theatre District revitalization plan. Theatre district revitalization plans go back as far as Mayor Jane Byrne's 1981 plan.

=== Revitalized ===
On April 1, 2004, TheatreDreams Chicago, LLC purchased the building for $3 million. The Balaban and Katz trademark is now the property of the Balaban and Katz Historical Foundation. New York's Madison Square Garden Entertainment announced October 11, 2007, that it would buy the theater.

Prior to 2008, the theater hosted the annual opening film of the Chicago International Film Festival until the festivities moved to the nearby Harris Theater. Mayor Richard M. Daley declared July 12, 2005 "Roger Ebert Day in Chicago" and dedicated a plaque under the marquee in his honor. The theater is featured in the book, The Chicago Movie Palaces of Balaban and Katz, by David Balaban, grandson of the original owner.

As of 2011, as permitted under the terms of sale dictated by the city, the vertical CHICAGO sign had a logotype for Chase Bank added to indicate sponsorship.

== Architecture ==
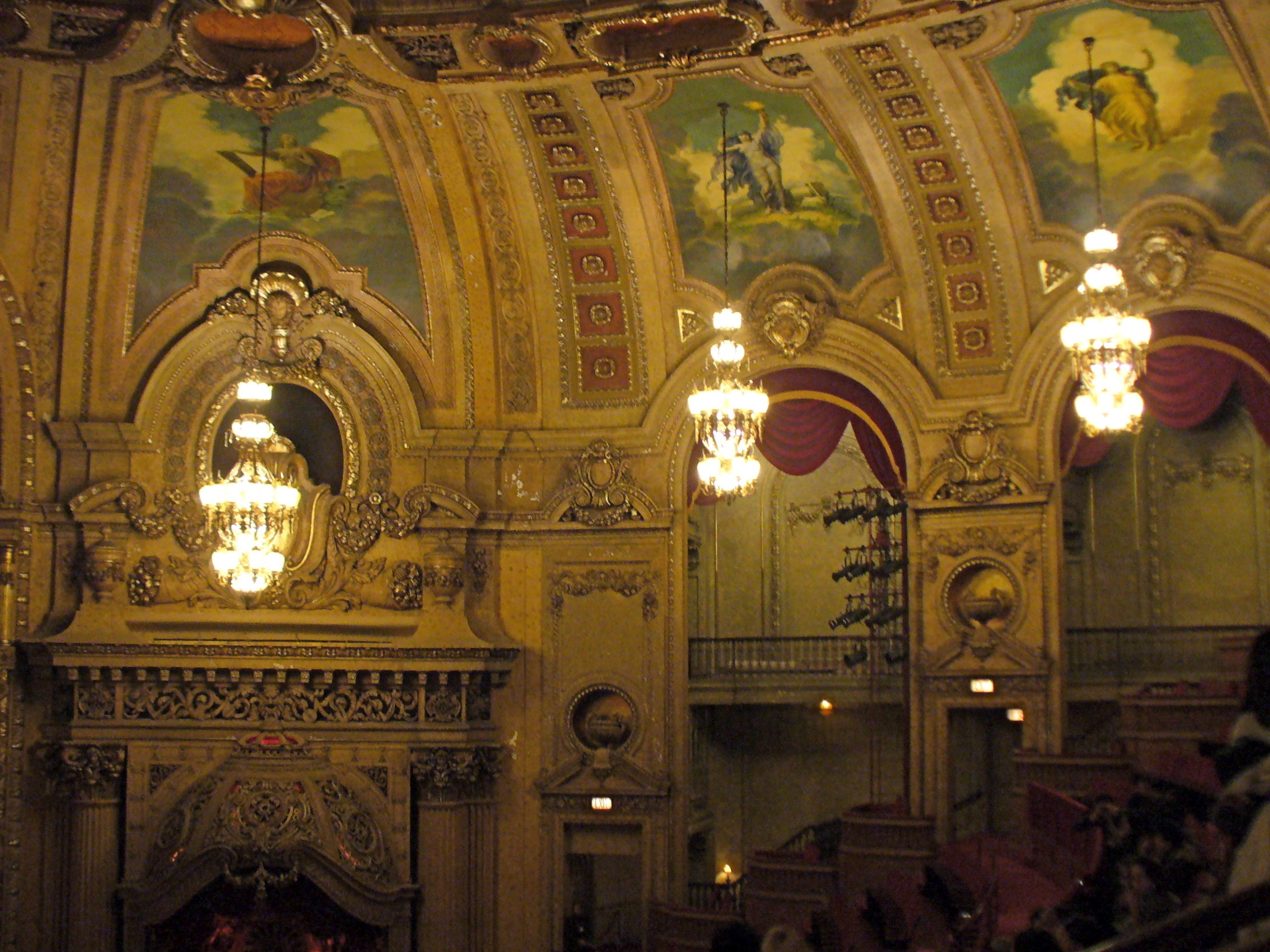
Auditorium detail showing murals, chandeliers, and gilded decorations.

The structure is seven stories tall and fills nearly one half of a city block. The 60-foot (18 m) wide by six-story tall triumphal arch motif of the State Street façade has been journalistically compared to the Arc de Triomphe in Paris. The central arch-headed window adapts the familiar motif of Borromini's false-perspective window reveals of the top floor of Palazzo Barberini, Rome. The coat of arms of the Balaban and Katz chain—two horses holding ribbons of 35 mm film in their mouths outlined by a border of film reels—is set inside a circular Tiffany stained glass window inside the arch. The exterior of the building is covered in off-white architectural terracotta supplied by the Northwestern Terra Cotta Company with Neo-Baroque stucco designs by the McNulty Brothers.

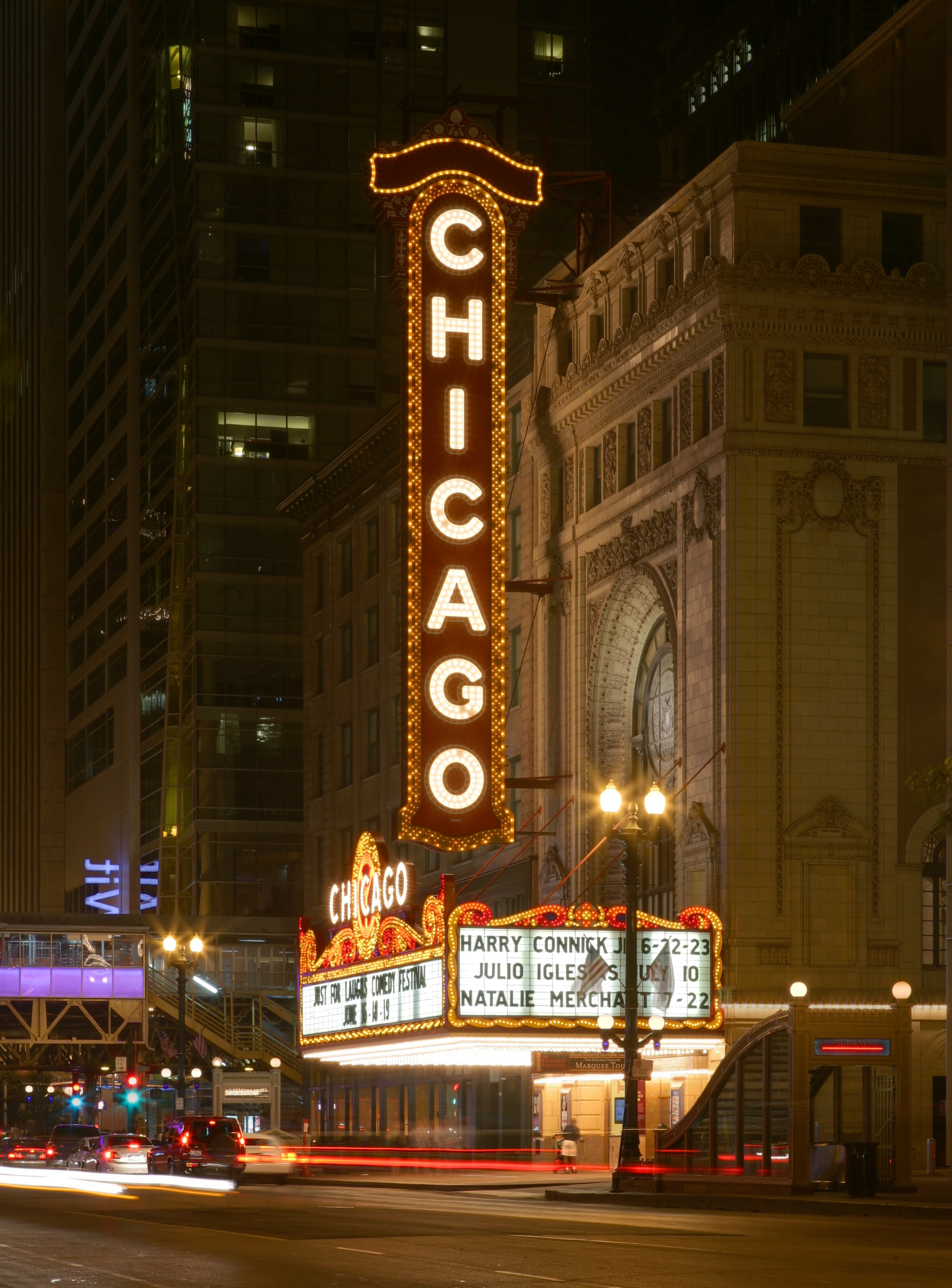
The sign on the theatre, June 2010

The interior shows French Baroque influence from the Second French Empire. The grand lobby, five stories high and surrounded by gallery promenades at the mezzanine and balcony levels, is influenced by the Royal Chapel at Versailles. The grand staircase is patterned from the grand stair of the Paris Opera House and ascends to the various balcony levels. Marshall Field and Company supplied interior decorations including drapes and furniture. The crystal chandeliers and bronze light fixtures fitted with Steuben glass shades were designed and built by Victor Pearlman and Co.

The stage dimensions exceed 60 feet (18 m) in width and 30 feet (9.1 m) in depth. The orchestra pit is approximately 6 feet (1.8 m) below stage level, 54 feet (16 m) wide at the stage lip, with a depth of 15 feet (4.6 m) at center. An adjustable pit filler can be used for performances requiring other levels.

At the time of the building's 1978 application for the National Register of Historic Places designation, the venue's marquee had been replaced twice. The original marquee was basic and facilitated two lines of text for announcements. The 1922–23 marquee had ornate "flashing pinwheels, swirls and garlands of colored lights". It also included "milk glass letter attraction boards, and CHICAGO in large letters on three sides". The 1949 replacement was similar to the second marquee, but its attraction boards were larger and the oversized CHICAGO lettering only appeared on the front. Until Balaban and Katz' 1969 sale to the American Broadcasting Company, their name was on the marquee. The entire marquee was replaced in 1994, but retains the look of its predecessor. In 2004, the original marquee was donated to the Smithsonian Institution. The marquee is featured in numerous movies and TV shows set in Chicago, and its neon font was used in the title of the 2002 film Chicago.

== Organ ==
The theater is also known for its grand Wurlitzer pipe organ. At the time it was installed it was known as "The Mighty Wurlitzer" and could imitate the instruments of an orchestra. Jesse Crawford, a noted Theatre Organ performer, is attributed as the person who "was responsible for the design and choice of sounds". The organ came from the Rudolph Wurlitzer Company of North Tonawanda in July 1921 with "four manuals and 26 ranks of pipes-Opus 434". It is one of the oldest Mighty Wurlitzers still in existence.

== See also ==
- National Register of Historic Places listings in Central Chicago
