= Barney Balaban =

American film studio executive (1887–1971)

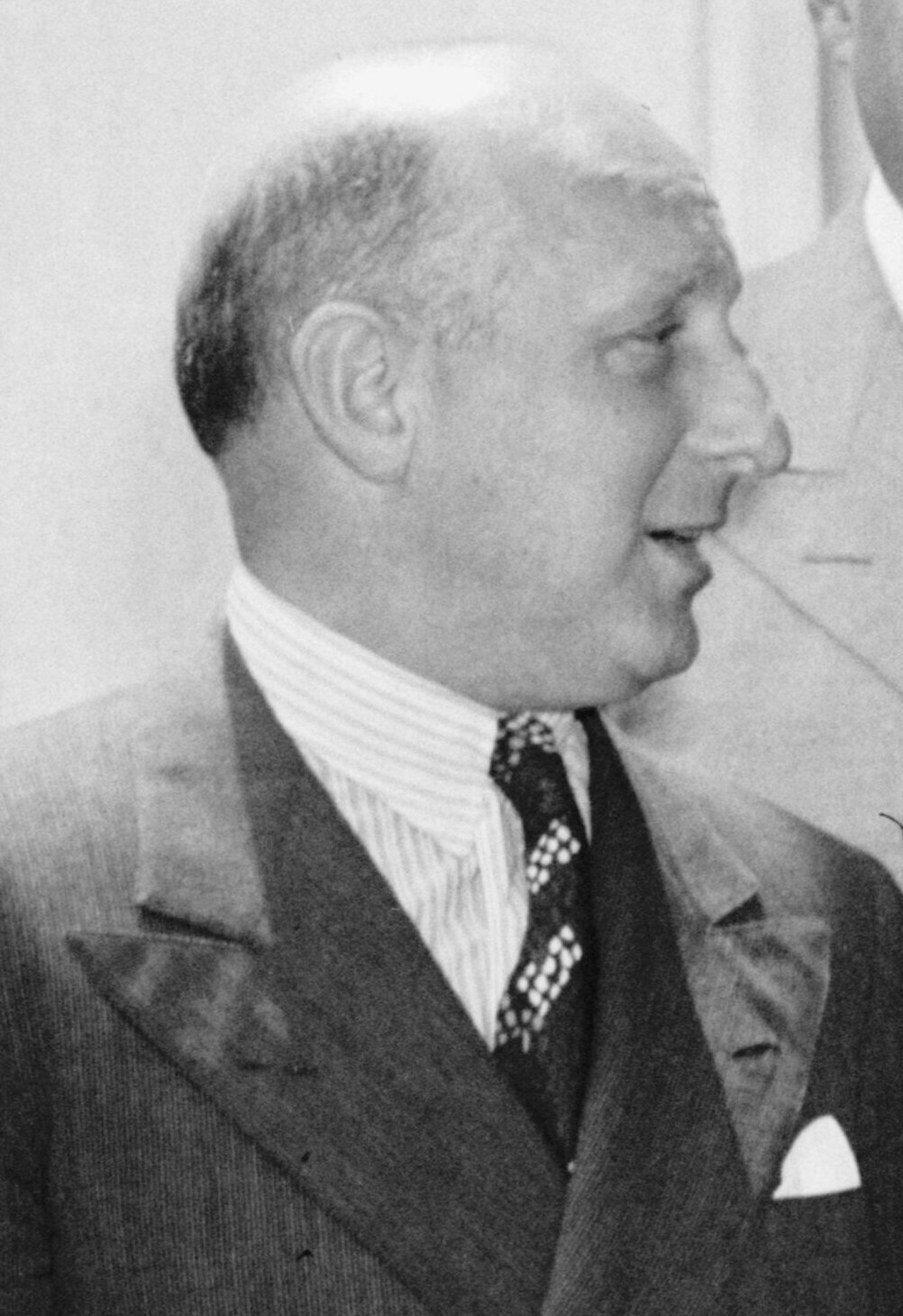
- Born: June 8, 1887; Chicago, Illinois, U.S.
- Died: March 7, 1971 (aged 83); Byram, Connecticut, U.S.
- Known for: President of Paramount Pictures
- Spouse: Tillie Urkov (m. 1929)
- Children: Judith Rose Balaban; Leonard "Red" Balaban; Burt Balaban
- Family: A. J. Balaban (brother); Max Balaban (brother); Elmer Balaban (brother); Bob Balaban (nephew); Jay Kanter (former son-in-law); Anthony Franciosa (former son-in-law); Don Quine (former son-in-law)

Barney Balaban (June 8, 1887 – March 7, 1971) was an American film executive and innovator in the film industry who was president of Paramount Pictures from 1936 to 1964, and honorary chairman until his death.

== Life and career ==
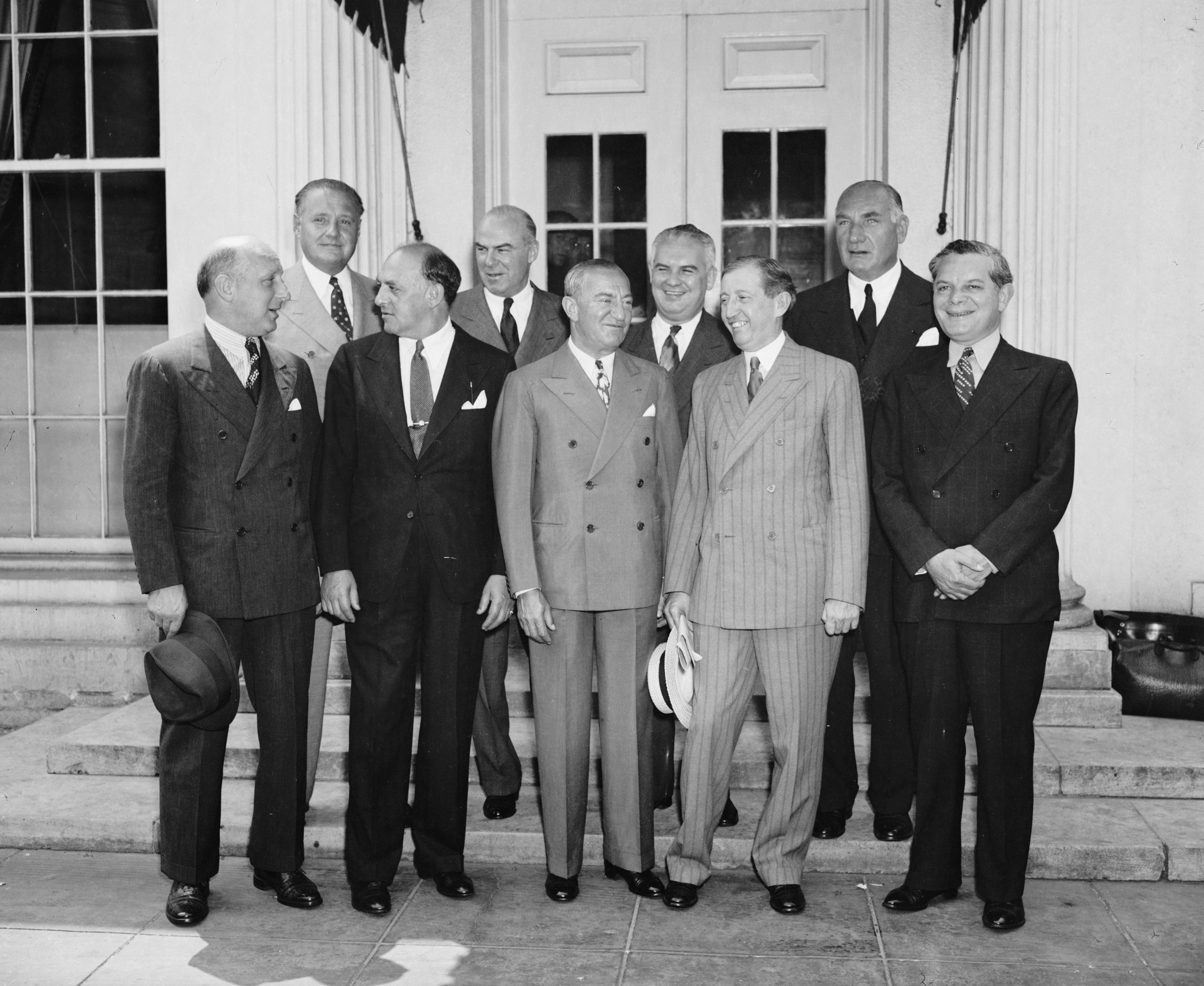
At the White House, front row, left to right: Barney Balaban, Paramount; Harry Cohn, Columbia Pictures; Nicholas M. Schenck, Loew's; Will H. Hays; Leo Spitz, RKO. Back row, left to right: George Schaefer, United Artists; Sidney Kent, 20th Century Fox; Nathan J. Blumberg, Universal; Albert Warner, Warner Bros., in 1938

Barney Balaban was the eldest of the seven sons of Bessarabian-Jewish immigrants Augusta "Goldie" (née Mandebursky, later Levin) from Odesa and grocery store owner Israel Balaban, from Tiraspol. His siblings in order were A. J., Leah, Ida, John, Max, Dave, Harry and Elmer.

Balaban worked as a messenger boy and a cold storage company employee until 1908, when he was persuaded, at age 21, to go into the cinema business. According to a 1945 article in Forbes magazine, his mother came home from her first picture show and commented, "The customers pay before they even see what they're paying for! There'll be money in that business."

Balaban and his younger brothers rented the 100-seat Kedzie Theater. From there, Balaban's innovations changed the industry. In 1910, Balaban built the Circle Theatre, the first cinema to have a balcony. After his sister Ida married Sam Katz (1892–1960), the two brothers-in-law made plans for a chain of cinemas in the Midwest, the Balaban and Katz Theatre Chain. Barney's brothers John, Dave, Abe (a.k.a. A. J.), and Max all worked for Balaban and Katz. Brothers Elmer and Harry owned their own theater concern called H & E Balaban.

The first link in the chain, the Central Park Theatre in Chicago, opened in 1917. Balaban and Katz set about to create the first air-conditioned movie theater. Their first theater cooling system combined a large fan blowing over cakes of ice in a washtub. Not only was the system noisy, it occasionally blew a shower of water onto the patrons. Balaban enlisted the aid of an engineer friend to create a workable system, and crowds began to go to the movies to escape the heat during the summer months, making motion picture exhibition a year-round business.

The Balaban and Katz chain (B & K) incorporated in 1923. A controlling interest was purchased in 1926 by Famous Players–Lasky Corporation in exchange for thirteen million dollars in stock. On July 2, 1936, Paramount's directors elected Balaban president of the studio, succeeding John E. Otterson. As president, Balaban had the philosophy that Paramount had a responsibility "to explain America, its customs, and its people, to the world." Balaban, the son of Bessarabian emigrants who had lived the American Dream, purchased one of the 14 original copies of the Bill of Rights from A.S.W. Rosenbach and, in 1945, donated it to the Library of Congress "as an expression of gratitude for the freedom his parents found in this country."

In 1929, Balaban married Tillie Urkov; they had three children, film producer and director Burt Balaban (predeceased in 1965), actress and author Judith R. Balaban (who was married and divorced from Jay Kanter, Anthony Franciosa, and Don Quine) and American jazz tubist and sousaphonist Leonard "Red" Balaban. Balaban died, aged 83, on March 7, 1971, with funeral services held at Westchester Jewish Center, Mamaroneck, New York.

Balaban continued as president of Paramount Pictures until 1964. He then became chairman until the 1966 takeover by Gulf and Western. The Balaban and Katz trademark is the property of the Balaban and Katz Historical Foundation. He was the uncle of actor Bob Balaban.

== Depiction in media ==
Balban appears in the season 2 episode "Hollywoodland" of the NBC series Timeless, portrayed by Josh Randall.

Barney Balaban (portrayed by Richard Portnow) was also a featured character in the movie Hitchcock, about Alfred Hitchcock and his struggle to get Psycho made.

== See also ==
- Elmer Balaban, brother
- Bob Balaban, nephew
