= Red Balaban =

American jazz musician (1929–2013)

- Born: Leonard Balaban; December 22, 1929
- Died: December 29, 2013 (aged 84)
- Spouse: Maxine "Micki" Israel
- Children: Michael Balaban; Steven Balaban; Rachel Balaban
- Parent(s): Tillie Urkov Balaban; Barney Balaban
- Family: Judy Balaban (sister); Burt Balaban (brother); Bob Balaban (cousin); A. J. Balaban (uncle); Elmer Balaban (uncle)

Leonard "Red" Balaban (December 22, 1929 – December 29, 2013) was an American jazz tubist and sousaphonist. He also played banjo, stand-up bass, slide trombone, ukulele and rhythm guitar.

Balaban resided as an adult in the Florida panhandle, where he worked as a farmer and played in regional ensembles from the 1950s. He held a regular gig from 1966 at the Dixieland jazz club Your Father's Mustache in New York City. He is the son of Barney Balaban, former president of Paramount Pictures. His sister is actress and author Judy Balaban and his brother is film producer and director Burt Balaban. He is of Jewish descent.

He worked extensively as a sideman, for musicians such as Wild Bill Davison, Eddie Condon, Gene Krupa, Dick Wellstood, and Kenny Davern. Balaban opened the third incarnation of Eddie Condon's Jazz club on W. 54th Street after arranging permission for using Eddie's name from Condon's widow. From 1975, he co-led the house band with Ed Polcer, with whom he later shared ownership of the club. Other noted musicians in this outfit included Vic Dickenson, Warren Vache, and Connie Kay. The club closed in the mid-1980s.

Balaban died at the age of 84 on December 29, 2013, after a brief illness. He was living with his wife of 62 years, Maxine (known as Micki), at their lakefront home in West Haven, Connecticut.
