= Chicago Deadline =

1949 film by Lewis Allen

- Theatrical release poster
- Directed by: Lewis Allen
- Screenplay by: Warren Duff
- Based on: the novel One Woman by Tiffany Thayer
- Produced by: Robert Fellows
- Starring: Alan Ladd; Donna Reed
- Cinematography: John F. Seitz
- Edited by: LeRoy Stone
- Music by: Victor Young
- Color process: Black and white
- Production company: Paramount Pictures
- Distributed by: Paramount Pictures
- Release date: November 3, 1949
- Running time: 86 minutes
- Country: United States
- Language: English
- Box office: $3.8 million

Chicago Deadline is a 1949 American film noir crime film directed by Lewis Allen and starring Alan Ladd and Donna Reed. The film is based on the 1933 novel One Woman by Tiffany Thayer.

It was remade as Fame Is the Name of the Game (1966).

== Plot ==
Chicago newspaper reporter Ed Adams is in a boarding house when the body of beautiful tenant Rosita Jean d'Ur is found. Ed takes her diary before the police arrive.

The police give the cause of death as tubercular hemorrhage, but Ed suspects otherwise. Of the fifty-four names listed in her diary Ed talks to hoodlum Solly Wellman, trust company vice-president G. G. Temple, and Belle Dorset, all of whom deny knowing Rosita. Belle Dorset immediately moves home.

At a party Ed meets alluring blonde Leona Purdy, who knew Rosita. Ed starts dating Leona. Ed believes Rosita was not promiscuous but was compassionate and mistreated. Ed's suspicions grow when both Wellman and Temple threaten him.

Rosita's brother Tommy Ditman tells Ed his sister ran away aged seventeen from their home in Amarillo, Texas. Tommy tracked her down to San Francisco where she had fallen in love with artist Paul Jean d'Ur. They married and moved to New York, after which Tommy didn't see her much. Their marriage went bad, Paul died in a car accident, and Rosita became lonely and bitter and had difficulty keeping a job.

Gangster Blacky Franchot arranges to meet Ed to talk about Rosita but is shot before Ed arrives. He says to Ed "I loved her" before he dies. Ed reports to the city editor, Gribbe, who writes a long column making Rosita's life and fate sound sensational and mysterious.

Leona reveals that Rosita had been involved with Blacky, although she was frightened of his connections to gangster Wellman. She resisted the persistent advances of Temple. When Blacky was severely beaten they moved to the countryside together. When Blacky left her, Rosita returned to Chicago and started dating Temple.

Ed accuses Temple of ordering Blacky's beating but Temple denies it. Interfering police detective Anstruder insists on accompanying Ed as he meets with invalid Hotspur Shaner, for whom Rosita worked as a housekeeper under an assumed name. The man who introduced them, John Spingler, is reported murdered, and Ed uses the distraction to get away from the police.

Rosita's former maid, Hazel, tells Ed Rosita left Temple when he hit her a year before her death. Leaving Hazel's building, Ed is knocked unconscious by two of Wellman's thugs and awakens in a junkyard. Ed takes Leona to a boxing match featuring the last names listed in Rosita's diary: fighter Bat Bennett and his manager, Jerry Cavanaugh. Jerry reveals that Bat fell in love with and became distracted by Rosita. Jerry threatened to expose her to Wellman unless she ended the relationship. Rosita reluctantly agreed and disappeared.

When Temple is murdered, Wellman is thought to be responsible. Ed believes Temple financed Wellman's rackets. Belle tells Ed that Wellman had hired Spingler to get rid of Rosita. Belle denies knowing of Spingler's duplicity until reading of Rosita's death.

Wellman shoots and wounds Ed before escaping. Belle reveals the missing link in Rosita's history: on the night of their argument, Temple admitted to Rosita, whom he was supporting, that he hired Wellman to get rid of Blacky. During the ensuing argument Temple struck Rosita down and panicked when she appeared dead. He called Wellman for help.

Wellman corners Ed in a shootout in a parking garage and Ed kills Wellman. At Rosita's funeral, Ed tells Tommy what really happened to his sister, and then burns her diary in the funeral parlor's eternal flame.

== Cast ==
- Alan Ladd as Ed Adams
- Donna Reed as Rosita Jean d'Ur
- June Havoc as Leona
- Irene Hervey as Belle Dorset
- Arthur Kennedy as Tommy Ditman
- Berry Kroeger as Solly Wellman
- Harold Vermilyea as Anstruder
- Shepperd Strudwick as Blacky Franchot
- Dave Willock as Pig
- Gavin Muir as G.G. Temple
- John Beal as Paul Jean d'Ur
- Tom Powers as Howard
- Howard Freeman as Hotspur Shaner
- Paul Lees as Bat
- Margaret Field as Minerva
- Harry Antrim as Gribbe
- Roy Roberts as Jerry Cavanaugh
- Marietta Canty as Haze

== Production ==
The novel One Woman was published in 1933. Paramount bought the film rights and announced the following year they would film it as Are Men Worth It? starring Lee Tracy and Claudette Colbert. In 1935 the project was listed on Paramount's schedule with Colbert still attached. Charles MacArthur and Ben Hecht were reportedly working on a script with Benjamin Glazer. No film resulted. However the success of Laura (1944) and The Big Clock (1948), which contained similar story elements to the novel, saw it put back into development as a vehicle for Alan Ladd. Robert Fellows was assigned the job of producing and Warren Duff given the job of writing the script.

Donna Reed had just appeared opposite Ladd in Beyond Glory. She was borrowed from MGM again to play his co-star. Lewis Allen was assigned to direct.

Filming started on July 29, 1948, on location in Chicago. The title was changed from One Woman to Chicago Deadline in November.

== Reception ==
=== Box office ===
According to Variety the film was the 37th most popular movie in the US and Canada in 1949 earning $2.1 million. It earned $1.7 million the following year.

=== Critical response ===
When the film was released Stephen O. Saxe, writing for The Harvard Crimson, recommended the film due to the acting, the action and suspense. He wrote, "Chicago Deadline is a picture with a Twist. It's not an O. Henry twist, either ... [the picture offers] a good plot with plenty of suspense, and, in due course, lots of action ... Chicago Deadline is not the sort of picture you'd go out of your way to see; but once inside, you won't walk out, either."

Film critic Bosley Crowther dismissed suspension of disbelief in his review, "People who picture reporters as dashing young fellows, all named 'Scoop,' whose lives are just rounds of excitement in what such people call the 'newspaper game' will find the ideal of their illusion in the newshawk Alan Ladd plays in Paramount's Chicago Deadline ... But for those other level-headed people whose knowledge of newspaper men—and, indeed, of life in general—is a little more sober and sane, this fancy will surely seem a mish-mosh of two-penny-fiction cliches, recklessly thrown together in an almost unfathomable plot. Flashbacks and narrative descriptions will fascinate them no more than will Mr. Ladd's ridiculous posturing as a brilliant newspaper man-sleuth."

In his review of the film, Dennis Schwartz, compared the film to Otto Preminger's Laura (1944), "In a Laura type of minor film noir, director Lewis Allen fails to make his love sick hero who is mooning over a corpse into anything but a superhero figure ... The film failed to make his cop character as inviting as Laura made Dana Andrews.

=== Adaptations ===
The story was adapted for radio on Screen Director's Playhouse in 1950 with Alan Ladd reprising his role.

=== Accolades ===
Nomination

- Edgar Allan Poe Awards: Edgar, Best Motion Picture; shared with: Tiffany Thayer; 1950.
