= A. J. Balaban =

American showman (1889–1962)

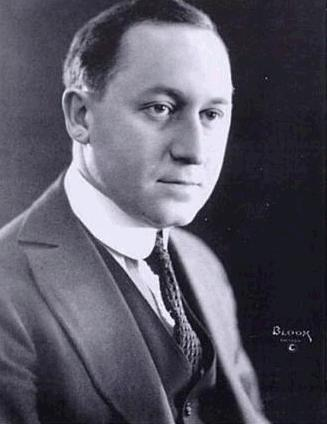
- Born: Abraham Joseph Balaban; April 20, 1889; Chicago, Illinois, United States
- Died: November 1, 1962 (aged 73); New York, New York, United States
- Occupations: Co-founder, Balaban & Katz motion picture theatre chain in Chicago - Pioneer of integration and refinement of live entertainment into motion picture exhibition - Innovator in movie theatre management
- Years active: 1908–1953
- Spouse: Carrie Strump (m. 1918)
- Children: 3
- Family: Barney Balaban (brother); Max Balaban (brother); Elmer Balaban (brother); Burt Balaban (nephew); Bob Balaban (nephew); Judy Balaban (niece); Leonard "Red" Balaban (nephew)

Abraham Joseph Balaban (April 20, 1889 – November 1, 1962) was an American showman whose influence on popular entertainment in the early 20th century led to enormous innovations in the American movie-going experience.

After leasing and operating a nickelodeon house in 1909, Balaban oversaw the commission and design of Chicago's great movie palaces for the Balaban & Katz (B&K) exhibition chain, integrated live performers into themed stage extravaganzas with full orchestras and forever changing vaudeville, and inspired numerous and novel ideas for theatre management.

A. J. Balaban's most productive period was from 1909 to 1929. It was a measure of his success and respect that in 1929, the February 27 issue of Variety was dedicated to him, and the following August a massive Citizens' Dinner in Chicago was organized to bid him farewell upon his move to New York to assume a creative position with Paramount/Publix, with which B&K had merged in 1926.

The artistic and managerial genius of the Balaban & Katz team (brother Barney was known for his financial and real estate acumen, while Katz was a lawyer), A. J. Balaban—from his earliest years as a young man singing in small theatres to illustrated glass slides, to the mastery of "presentations" that featured singers, dancers, and musicians in a variety of turns culminating into lavish tableaux—had as an overarching inspiration the comfort and satisfaction of the audience.

According to Abel Green, editor of Variety, the venerable show business trade newspaper, Balaban "did more than any individual to glorify the cinema setting", and his theatre management established a successful model for other national exhibitors. As for performers and the production of effective shows and pacing, William Morris Senior, the talent manager, wrote in an open letter in Variety to Balaban, "You have done more for [vaudeville's] proper presentation than any other man ever connected with it."

Among Balaban's many show-business innovations were large theatres seating thousands of people in grand architectural palaces that resembled "fairy-lands"; the integration of movies and stage shows, alternating throughout the day; the presentation on movie-theatre stages of many of the giants of American show business, including The Four Marx Bros., Sophie Tucker, Gladys Swarthout, Ginger Rogers, organist Jesse Crawford, and the orchestras of Paul Whiteman and John Philip Sousa, among many others; stage bands for every theatre, each with its own master of ceremonies, usually a gifted orchestra conductor "M.C." like S. Leopold Kohls or Paul Ash; rigorous training for theatre ushers, drawn from the local male college population; theatre checkrooms with courteous "no-tipping" service; and single admission charges for continuous performances.

Between bouts of elective retirement in Geneva, Switzerland, and other locales, Balaban returned to the film and exhibition business periodically. Beginning in 1942, Balaban began nearly a decade as Executive Director of New York's Roxy Theatre at the request of Spyros Skouras of 20th Century-Fox, restoring the theatre to profitability with access to first-run Fox films, as well as the production and presentation of first-class live shows. During this time, Balaban installed an ice rink on the Roxy stage, and instigated the first-ever "four-a-day" by the New York Philharmonic for two weeks in September 1950.

Although the "presentation style" mix of movies and elaborate stage shows is no longer in popular or economic favor, it was Balaban's pioneering success in Chicago with this combination that today is often associated with Radio City Music Hall in New York.

== Early life and career ==
A.J. Balaban was the second of eight children born in Chicago to Jewish parents Augusta "Goldie" (née Mandebursky, later Levin) from Odesa and grocery store owner Israel Balaban, from Tiraspol. Barney, the financial mainstay of the family, was the first born and in young adulthood would come to work for the Western Cold Storage Company, earning $25 a week. After A.J. came a daughter, Ida, followed by brothers John, Max, Dave, Harry and Elmer. The large family lived in back of a grocery store run by the parents.

At an early age, the two oldest boys would go to plays at local Chicago theatres, and Balaban confessed that "theatre fascinated me".

After a variety of odd jobs, Balaban found steady employment as an errand boy for local clothiers, hauling woolens and delivering suits. In his off hours, he pursued opportunities to sing, with his sister accompanying him on the piano. At his older brother's urging, he prepared a business card that read: "Abe Balaban, Singer. Character Songs."

On New Year's Eve, just before 1917 rolled in, Balaban proposed to Carrie Strump, a girl he had known in grade school and with whom he had become recently reacquainted. In April 1918, Balaban and his fiancé traveled to New York, where Balaban phoned Variety to get the name of a good rabbi to perform the marriage ceremony. The couple was wed on April 7, 1918.

In September 1922, Balaban's sister Ida, now Mrs. Sam Katz, died. Balaban's first child, Idajoy, named after her deceased aunt, was born in December. (Balaban and wife Carrie had two other children—daughter Cherry Blossom, born on her father's birthday in April 1924, and son Bruce in August 1928.)

== Early theatres ==
When ice and ice-cream purveyor and owner and founder of the "Sparkle Ice Company" and "Nonebetter Ice Cream Company", Samuel Donian, owner of "The Kedzie", a "nickel show" in a store on the corner of Kedzie and 12th Street, needed a last-minute act, 18-year-old A.J. and his sister performed "Take Me Back to New York Town".

"How different it all was to the worries about fruit and vegetables spoiling before they were sold, and quarrels about under-weight and over-charge!" he recounted in his 1942 memoir, Continuous Performance. "It seemed much more attractive to me to rent a store where we could sell people a good time. 'We have only to rent films and hire a picture operator,' I said. 'I could be the singer and Ida could play the piano.'"

=== The Kedzie ===
During the first week singing at the Kedzie, the family came to hear A.J. and Ida, and on the way home his mother Gusse was enticed by the idea of a 'cash business' for the family. A.J. learned from Charles Klaproth, the Kedzie's theatre manager and picture operator, that the Kedzie would rent for $100 a month. Balaban met with Donian about taking over the theatre operation, and "persuaded his family to rent the Kedzie from Donian". Pooling their savings of $178, the two older Balaban brothers and their parents took over the Kedzie on January 11, 1908; they all kept their day jobs.

A.J. Balaban would book the films during his lunch break, acquiring product from the Vitagraph, Biograph, Lubin, Essanay and Edison studios. At once he eliminated two of Donian's promotions—a "circus-spieler" urging audiences to step inside, and a large gramophone blasting tunes to the street—intuitively choosing a more restful and less honky-tonk image.

After a day's work, he would go to the theatre, where the doors would open at 7 p.m. The house had 103 camp chairs, some of which were broken and therefore not revenue-producers, and there were difficulties with electricity and attendance during severe winter storms. The shows and entertainment changed daily, with Balaban and his sister performing to "Illustrated Songs". Balaban would mingle with the audience and urge everyone to sing together.

In addition to performing, Balaban also greeted incoming customers, beginning a lifelong commitment to hospitality and personal attention. His first innovation was to celebrate a holiday with a related film and entertainment. According to Balaban, his St. Patrick's Day screening of "The Irish Blacksmith" with his singing of "She's the Daughter of an A.P.A." and "Tipperary", was "the talk of the neighborhood".

A violinist was hired whose job was to accompany the films and participate in the entertainment. At first the musician, preoccupied with watching the picture, played incompatible passages. Balaban suggested the application of faster and slower music to correspond with the action. "So began the first music-cuing of our films", he recalled.

By spring, with competitors looking for locations on the same street, Balaban told his older brother that they needed to build a bigger theatre. In September 1908, the brothers announced that they would not renew their lease on the Kedzie, but would build a $25,000 theatre on a lot at Sawyer and 12th Street, one block away. Though they concluded their relationship with the Kedzie in January 1909, the new theatre—to be called the Circle—would not open until Labor Day. Debts piled up, but Balaban relayed that "I loved every minute of the terrific wrestling of planning shows and house-management policies. New ideas seemed to pop like fire-crackers in my mind."

=== The Circle ===
With The Circle featuring 700 seats and a four-piece orchestra, Balaban instigated a two-show-nightly policy, with matinees on Saturday and Sunday. With those responsibilities, Balaban left his steady employment and spent most of his days at the offices of the Western Vaudeville Agency. Having studied talent wherever he sang, he had learned to assess the entertainment value of performers. And he began to consider how to routine the Circle's shows, alternating between short films like "Aesop's Fables" and "Pathe Weeklies" and live acts, creating terms like "openers", "fillers" and "chasers". Israel Balaban, his father, carried films to and from the theatre each day.

A scant two months after its opening, the show business trade paper Variety called The Circle "a neat little house" that for an admission of 10 cents provided "four vaudeville acts and several reels of pictures. The house changes shows every Thursday and Monday, splitting with S. Chicago." Still, a Variety review published in January 1910, (the Balabans are referred to as the Hardaman Brothers, with misspellings in subsequent reviews to include Bollaban, Bolabon, and Ballaban), chides the theatre for poor arrangement of its acts. Balaban admitted that, later, he "saw and remedied the monotony and sameness that had defeated 'variety'—the other name for vaudeville."

One remedy was the recognition of pure talent. Balaban worked with Minnie Palmer, mother to The Four Marx Bros., to book the Marxes' "Fun in High School", a popular act, and he worked often at The Circle with singer Sophie Tucker. Tucker wrote in her autobiography that "A. J. was the first to put on presentation shows in all the picture houses. It was he who brought out the first big bands. His houses with their huge orchestras, stage show, and pictures, all for less than a dollar admission. ... A.J. had a positive genius for knowing what the public would go for."

The other remedy was a responsibility Balaban felt toward the audience, "for making these people happy and gay; to release them even for a moment from the depression of their drab homes and usually burdened lives. That was my big aim and it dominated my every thought."

Balaban considered theatre management to be as creative and exciting as booking and creating the entertainment. His innovations at The Circle included free admission for children under 10 (a younger brother drew a line on the wall approximating the height of a ten-year-old for questionable admissions) and a baby carriage service that watched over sleeping infants on the sidewalk outside of the theatre. When a baby awoke, a slide would be flashed on the screen—"Mother, Number 47, your baby is crying." Other innovations attributed to A. J. Balaban include themed holiday presentations; shoppers' bargain matinees; reduced prices for week-day and non-peak hours, and midnight shows; giant illuminated theatre signs; and on-site nursery playrooms and hospital facilities.

In addition to entertainment and hospitality innovations, the Balabans continued to make new business connections, securing an interest in the Ashland Theatre, taking over the Magnet Theatre near The Circle, and starting a film exchange called The General Feature Film Co. Balaban, capitalizing on what he saw as American audiences' fascination with film stars, opened a restaurant called The Movie Inn decorated with portraits of Theda Bara, Mary Pickford, Dorothy Gish, Fatty Arbuckle, Francis X. Bushman, Norma Talmadge and many others. Problems with the liquor license, gigolos preying on married women, and "waiter trouble" led Balaban to retire from the café business, declaring that the theatre business was "tame and safe by comparison."

== Early picture palaces ==
In 1914, Balaban met Sam Katz, a by-day law clerk assisting his father, Morris Katz, at nights with the Katz family's own theatres. The young men became close, lunching together every day and sharing their visions for the future. According to Balaban, his own dream was to build 5,000-seat "Presentation Houses" on every side of town. He wrote that Katz told him, "I see no future in this business for me." In time, Katz married Balaban's sister, Ida.

By 1915, Balaban suggested that his brother Barney resign his position as chief clerk at Western Cold Storage and take advantage of Chicago's real estate opportunities, created by the city's rapidly expanding middle-class. Pooling talents, Barney Balaban, A.J. Balaban and Sam Katz formed Balaban & Katz in 1916 and financed the construction of a new 2,400-seat theatre, the Central Park, on Chicago's West Side.

=== The Central Park ===
In 1916, Balaban "took Katz to Baraboo, Wisconsin, to see the memorial theatre of the Ringling Brothers designed by Rapp and Rapp. It was a replica of a small European opera house. Katz was impressed with the Rapps" so A.J. Balaban engaged the brothers Cornelius W. and George L. Rapp as the architects for the new theatre, which—due to strides in steel construction—boasted a column-free auditorium and a grand horseshoe mezzanine of boxes, with a full balcony above.

The Central Park opened on October 27, 1917, and its success led to many more Rapp and Rapp commissions for Balaban and Katz. At that time, Balaban gave an interview to the Chicago Herald-Examiner outlining his vision for the future of motion picture houses:

"Five thousand seat houses; theatres built and constructed with artistic themes dedicated to the people and their children's children; music and art; ladies' parlors where milady's every wish will be on call; men's lounging room; theatre that will bring the various arts into one grand finale; blending of the opera to the fastest tempo of jazz; meeting place of the aristocrat and humble worker; order of the day of just a place to sit and be amused is passing; future show business will not be conducted by showmen but by business men; amusement is a business and the future of that business lies in business hands; business to come of selling amusement to millions and millions of men, women and children; and to that business, we (Balaban and Katz), who have taken it upon ourselves, should give and dedicate our theatres."

Thanks to Barney Balaban's experience with cold storage, the theatre had a washed air system and was air-cooled, allowing for refuge from summer heat—and year-round patronage. The stage was flanked by two side stages decorated to resemble gardens. According to Balaban's memoir, "Our colored stage lighting was extended to take in the whole house. The gently changing colors traveled from wall to ceiling, melting from soft rose to blue, lavender and yellow as they touched the velour of seats, crystal of chandeliers and the beautifully painted murals."

Balaban also believed that "a central figure in the orchestra pit seemed essential", identifying a young Viennese, S. Leopold Kohls, whose continental manners made him an ideal host and "good theatre. ... He understood and co-operated fully with my ideas of creating fairyland illusion by the use of music, beautiful girls, color and line." Kohls was "an instant hit".

Balaban engaged New York City-based New York Studios to provide the side stages, drop curtain and stage scenery, with Frank Cambria, the Studios' Art Director and General Manager, in charge. Cambria boasted associations with New York's well-known producers and managers Charles Frohman, James O'Neill, David Belasco, Klaw and Erlanger, Winthrop Ames, Daniel Frohman and others, and had designed many prestigious productions.

With business booming only a few months after the opening of the Central Park, Balaban & Katz received an opportunity to take over an unfinished vaudeville house. With Rapp and Rapp in tow, it was determined that the shell was large enough for Balaban's newest "fairyland", the Riviera Theatre, on Chicago's North Side.

=== The Riviera ===
The new Riviera was in a race to open against the Pantheon, a competing theatre around the corner. By 4 p.m of opening day, September 9, 1918, crowds were in line around the block in anticipation of the doors opening at 6 p.m. Balaban wrote that he recognized many of his previous customers—from the Kedzie, Circle, and Central Park—now older, with a baby or two in tow.

The stage bill consisted of semi-classics performed by vocalists including Gladys Swarthout and Tess Gardell (sic; generally known as Gardella), also known as "Aunt Jemima", who once came to the rescue of anxious patrons when the lights went out accidentally. In the dark auditorium she began singing "You're In Virginia Sure As You're Born", calming frazzled nerves.

Frank Cambria's design for Balaban's Thanksgiving-themed presentation, featuring a giant pumpkin and dancers representing a waif, a chicken and scarecrow, was a big hit, bringing a newspaper notice that read, "We see production in the motion picture shows." And for the run of Humoresque, the story of a young violinist, Cambria broke the picture by injecting the appearance on stage of a young man playing the violin to bring drama to the entire theatrical experience. A columnist tagged "Observer" in the Chicago Herald-Examiner wrote, "it would be well indeed if only as a matter of civic pride to bring New York to town to let it see how Balaban & Katz put pictures on."

Another Balaban innovation was to provide free tickets to orphans, the aged, and the handicapped, particularly during slow periods before the Christmas holidays. And he provided a club room for the ushers, a recreation room for the musicians, and the start of First Aid Rooms in all future B&K theatres with a trained attendant. Additionally there was a playroom for children—again with a trained attendant, a sand box, slide, and toys—and a free checking service for suitcases and parcels.

The success of Balaban & Katz brought challenges. A ten-week musicians' strike in 1919 called on Balaban's encyclopedic knowledge of vaudeville acts with their own pianists, in order to substitute for large orchestras. And he and his family "lived under constant fear of hoodlums", requiring a nightly police escort home.

=== The Tivoli ===
The first of Balaban & Katz's "big three" Chicago theatres, The Tivoli opened at 6:30 p.m. on February 16, 1921, on Chicago's South Side. The opening night in the city's first 4,000-seat motion picture theatre reportedly was a mob scene, with some people who had no intention of going to the theatre swept in off the streets by the crushing crowds. The Chicago Health Commissioner declared that the air-conditioned air in The Tivoli "was better than that on Pike's Peak".

The Tivoli also boasted military-style drilling of the ushers, who were uniformed college boys strictly coached in their duties and service to the patrons. When the young men went off duty at evening's end, their "maneuvers" were enjoyed by patrons. The type of usher desired was later published in "The Fundamental Principles of Balaban & Katz Theatre Management", a handbook outlining Balaban's successful principles for running a large theatre.

=== The Chicago ===
The opening of The Tivoli was followed eight months later on October 26, 1921, by the opening of the Rapp and Rapp-designed Chicago, a 3,600-seat theatre on State Street in the heart of the business and shopping district. The theatre featured a 50-piece orchestra, a specially built Wurlitzer organ with percussive effects, and a team of 125 ushers.

The successful combining, in palatial surroundings, of an elaborate stage show, created by Balaban, with Hollywood's more sophisticated and popular movies was becoming a staple of the movie-going experience—and a profitable Balaban & Katz signature. Other exhibitors would travel to Chicago in attempts to copy the formula. Eventually the Skouras Bros. and others would select stage shows they wanted for their own theatres.

=== The Uptown ===
By the time the chain opened The Uptown, a 4,300-seat house and the last of its "big three", in 1925, the production of stage-show "units", as they came to be known, served as an elaborate pipeline to the entire B&K circuit; the chain even had its own movie magazine.

Frank Cambria, now living in Chicago, had become full-time art director for Balaban & Katz, and he hired a young costume designer, Vincent G. Minnelli (as he was billed in a B&K Production Department ad in Variety), to begin making costumes that the chain had formerly rented. Minnelli eventually would be promoted to a set designer as well. By 1929, Hollywood composer-to-be Victor Young was also a part of the B&K Production Department team, responsible for musical arrangements.

In his autobiography, Minnelli wrote that The Chicago's stage presentations were "later copied by Radio City Music Hall. ... The shows ran a week at each theater, opening at the Chicago, then moving on to the Tivoli and the Uptown. A.J. Balaban would tour the theatres with Mr. Cambria and me every Monday, when the shows changed. We'd catch the first show at the Chicago downtown, then to the second show at the Tivoli. We'd have dinner before driving to the North Side and the last show at the Uptown."

== On a grand scale ==
=== Stage attractions ===
In refining an entire sector of show business during the explosion of motion pictures, Balaban assisted in elevating and changing the vaudeville business. The type of stage attractions ballyhooed by the B&K theatres ("10,000 turned away daily") that Balaban was in charge of, include such titles as:

- "Syncopation Week";
- a Washington's Birthday tribute with a full-stage depiction of "Washington Crossing the Delaware";
- "Opera Versus Jazz";
- "Anniversary Show" with dance bands on stage for the first time, featuring Ted Lewis, Roy Bargy, Ted Fiorita (sic; generally known as Fio Rito), Fred Waring's Pennsylvanians, Paul Whiteman and John Philip Sousa (the latter two had never played motion picture houses before, according to Balaban, and "had to be paid well to do four daily shows, with five on Saturdays and Sundays");
- "Short Versions of Opera";
- "Tableaux of Operettas";
- singing novelty "Great Lovers", in which lovers in history, like Romeo and Juliet and Abelard and Heloise, serenaded one other;
- a Sunday noontime "Symphonic Hour" conducted by Nat Finston with opera stars Tito Schipa, Emanuel List, and Gladys Swarthout;
- featured organists including Jesse Crawford, Milton Charles and Henry Keats;
- "Jazz Nights" at the Central Park (with Victor Young as first violinist); and
- "Midnight Shows" on New Year's Eve, presenting Fannie Brice, Van and Schenck, Bill "Bojangles" Robinson, Belle Baker, Blossom Seeley and Bennie Fields, Sophie Tucker, Ted Lewis and others.

A February 14, 1924 review in Variety said that a B&K presentation titled "Going Up" "graduated the Chicago Theatre stage shows from a mere prologue to a full-blooded presentation."

=== Master of ceremonies ===
Balaban is attributed with playing an important role in the development of the dance band business in the 1920s, "as one of the early Chicago entrepreneurs who ... created the venues in which the bands played and helped shape both bands and their establishments into key entertainment attractions. A.J. Balaban showcased his movie-theatre pit orchestras by putting them on stage. In doing so, he made stars out of nearly anonymous pit bandleaders."

Early in 1925, Balaban traveled to San Francisco's Granada Theatre to see orchestra conductor Paul Ash and was impressed with the bandleader's relationship with the audience—"the conductor as Master of Ceremonies." Despite the offer of less money, Balaban convinced Ash to come to Chicago. According to Balaban, "Paul was the first and greatest of all M.C.'s", giving Ginger Rogers, Ruth Etting, Joe Penner, Martha Raye ("then Martha Reed"), Amos and Andy ("then known as 'Sam' and 'Henry'") great starts and/or showcases. Alumni of Ash's orchestra include Benny Goodman, Glenn Miller and Red Norvo.

"At one performance, Will Rogers sprang over the footlights and onto the stage of his own accord, and introduced himself to Paul and the audience, announcing enthusiastically that he had never been in such a theatre atmosphere before. He declared it was like a huge house-party and he loved it", recalled Balaban.

Starting at Chicago's McVickers (a theatre that competitor Paramount/Publix had asked B&K to manage) where he played for a year, Ash moved to the B&K's Oriental for another two years, before leaving for New York in mid-1928. In May of that year, Variety determined that Ash had appeared 4,500 times in three years in Chicago, playing to 14,700,000 admissions for a total of approximately $6 million at the box office.

=== High priced talent ===
During the active years of preparing the stage productions, Balaban's right hand was Morris Silver, who made trips to New York to secure talent. Silver met Abe Lastfogel of the William Morris Vaudeville Agency, and urged Balaban to meet him. Balaban put the meeting off for many months until Lastfogel met him unexpectedly and invited him to see some acts. The men had an immediate bond. Soon the agency was providing $100 acts as well as $10,000 attractions.

Balaban later became acquainted with "Senior [William] Morris", and recalled that Morris and Lastfogel's "devotion and understanding took them out of the vaudeville-agency class, and much of the B & K stage-show success was due to them because they worked as if they were my partners." Later, Balaban would convince Paramount head Adolf Zukor to buy a half-interest in the William Morris Agency.

== Publix merger ==
By 1924, as B&K had become the most profitable movie theatre chain in the business. and acknowledged as a leading motion picture exhibitor, a merger was being considered with a film company. Beginning with taking over the McVickers, the Balaban brothers' relationship with Paramount/Publix had deepened.

In 1926, B&K merged with Paramount/Publix in a multimillion-dollar and stock swap deal. Sam Katz moved to New York to begin transferring the B&K system of theatre management to all Paramount Theatres across the nation. However, with the advent of the 'Talkies', by 1929, major theatres were systematically abandoning stage shows except in the largest houses. Short recordings of top vaudeville acts began to replace the high priced live talent in a strategy to lower costs and raise profits.

== Tributes ==
In February 1929, Variety dedicated an issue to A.J. Balaban—a tribute the publicity-shy executive neither sought nor wanted. Three significant articles were written about him—the largest by Sime Silverman, the founder and publisher of Variety, citing Balaban as "a pioneer years ago in the development of the present day picture theatre. ... For years, innovations and departures in picture house operation and stages have seemed to come out of Chicago ... always new and always starting in Chicago, in a Balaban & Katz house. These innovations remained. They became permanent. Imitated by other theaters. What was created in Chicago usually found itself inserted into the formula of theater running or stage entertainment. ... The vision, foresight and acumen of Marcus Loew and Adolph Zukor have never been denied. Place A. J. Balaban in that exclusive class. If A. J. Balaban has ever made an error in the direction of stage policy or local theatre organization, Variety has no record of it. ... [He] is one of those whom the picture trade historians will dwell upon in time to come, when the real record of the most spectacular industry in the world is placed in type."

The remaining tributes are written by Frank Cambria and Morris Silver. Writer Hal Halperin reported on how the issue came about, particularly that Balaban wanted nothing to do with it. The publications displays numerous tribute advertisements from William Morris Sr., the William Morris Agency, the Skouras Bros., Sid Grauman, and a vast number of William Morris artists and others, including Harry Lauder, John Philip Sousa, Ted Lewis, Gus Kahn, Sophie Tucker, Ginger Rogers, and Jesse Crawford. And a separate box, containing Balaban's 1917 predictions for the business (originally published in the Chicago Herald Examiner in October of that year after the opening of The Central Park) is headlined "A. J. Balaban Predicted in 1917 Future Show Business of Today."

== New York ==
By mid-1929, it was determined that Balaban and his family needed to move to New York, along with Frank Cambria and the entire production department. Vincente Minnelli recalls Cambria delivering "an ultimatum. If I wanted to stay with Balaban and Katz, I'd have to move with them to New York."

Now a Vice President of Paramount, Balaban was to supervise the creation and booking of remaining presentation units. He was made responsible for short subjects, which were moving into sound, and radio programs. ("The shorts were made up mainly of Presentations such as we had heretofore used on our stages, called Prologues and Productions", recalled Balaban. "When properly grouped together, these combined as a well-balanced vaudeville bill".)

By August 1929, when Balaban and family were ready to depart for Manhattan, the City of Chicago threw a Citizen's Dinner in his honor that befitted the showman's impressive career, as well as the high regard and affection held for him personally. In an article in the August 14, 1929, edition of the Chicago Evening American, columnist Rob Reel wrote, "The leave-taking of A.J., called by this columnist 'the beloved Balaban,' is quite an event in Chicago's history, as he will from now on no longer be concerned intimately with movie exhibition problems here. The head of the Balaban brothers, who is in large measure responsible for the entrance of the family in the picture business, and whose affiliation with Sam Katz so many years ago resulted in establishing an entertainment epoch, will go to New York to be placed in complete charge of all Publix stage presentations and the production of all Paramount talkie shorts. This dinner is really a nice gesture on the part of the community as well as the industry. The accommodations are limited to 1,600, and already reservations are pouring in so fast that it looks as though many friends and acquaintances of A. J. will be disappointed." Two hundred musicians, culled from all of the individual B&K theatre orchestras, created for the evening one giant ensemble.

The Balabans moved into an apartment at the Dorset Hotel on West 54th Street. Balaban was able to walk to work in the Paramount Building in Times Square.

His wife, Carrie, described his schedule: "My husband usually left for the Long Island Studios at 8 o'clock where he spent the morning. At two, he returned to his Paramount office to remain until late in the afternoon. Between 5:30 and six he would dash in to catch a glimpse of his babies and to snatch a bite of supper. Invariably he ate in silence, falling asleep on the couch immediately afterwards. ... Frequently it was necessary to awaken him because a ten-minute picture sequence or an act on Broadway had to be reported on by seven o'clock. He'd return from that, finish his nap, and dress for the theatre. Every play had to be seen, every picture opening attended; every café entertainer watched before or after theatre. There was never a free time to relax, not even one whole evening a week. I always accompanied him at night, even though many times I slept through entire second acts of the best plays."

== Early retirement ==
Balaban's success as a Paramount executive, he recalled, "nearly defeated me in another field of life which I deemed equally precious"—time with his family and his eagerness to travel. And his wife told him, "You have no time to eat or to sleep and you never smile any more. This grind will kill us all off if we stay." By his own admission, Balaban was "bleary-eyed from the loss of sleep and worry. ... I made the decision to take a six months' vacation and to leave for Europe where no theatres could claim my services."

It appears that with the advent of sound pictures and their novelty, the influence of the presentation units so beloved by Balaban were on the wane and may have been an influence in his early retirement. Minnelli wrote in his memoir that Paramount ultimately disbanded all traveling presentation units in 1933.

With his brother Barney and his partner Sam Katz, Balaban had spent more than twenty years building B&K, helped pull the family out of a life of near poverty and hardship (including the payment of all of his father's debts), and brought the younger brothers into the family business as each became old enough. (The youngest brother was born the same year the family first rented the Kedzie). A. J. and Barney were "very close and always felt a great sense of responsibility for their family's welfare." Each brother received a piece of B&K and the youngest were provided with college educations. Harry and Elmer would go on to form their own business and become pioneers in radio and television.

Balaban was ready to retire. In April 1930, he confirmed his resignation to the press, announcing that he intended "to enter a larger field in the theatrical business."

As early immigrants, Balaban's parents—intending to travel abroad with A.J. and his family—had no official "papers" with which to secure passports. Thanks to a last-minute intervention by William Morris Sr., all of the Balabans sailed at last on the Berengaria to Europe in May 1930. A.J. Balaban was 40 years old. The family lived in Geneva, Switzerland for a few years, and considered the city its base, no matter where their travels or interests took them.

== The Esquire ==
In 1936, Balaban was induced by his brother Barney to return to Chicago to build a movie theatre for younger brothers Harry and Elmer, of H&E Theatres, with Paramount's backing. His family lived in Evanston, Illinois, during this period. Balaban selected two young Chicago-based consultants, Pereira and Pereira, to design the Esquire Theatre, which opened in 1938, in a posh Art Moderne style.

One of the nation's first "art houses", the theatre featured an art gallery and a coffee bar lounge. Popcorn was not served. When asked if the theatre was going to have an orchestra pit, Balaban reportedly replied, "That's over." Instead of offering a bill of multiple films, the theatre showed only one film, combined with "The Esquire Hour", a section of shorts, cartoons and a quote for the day. Oriented to only film presentations and not stage shows, its sight-lines and acoustics were designed for top projection and audio quality. Architectural Forum selected it as "Building of the Month" in April 1938.

The family returned to Geneva—where Balaban was a frequent visitor to the League of Nations headquarters—then lived in Paris until the advent of war in Europe, when the family returned to the U.S. They lived in Greenwich, Connecticut, and then moved back to New York and the Dorset Hotel.

== The Roxy ==
In the early Forties, Spyros Skouras approached Balaban about managing The Roxy Theatre near Times Square, which was not operating profitably. Its executive group consisted of people Balaban knew; rather than replace them, he re-invigorated them.

The theatre kept its stage shows, but Balaban oversaw them and "hired top names to head the stage shows. Milton Berle, Jack Benny, Cab Calloway ... all played the Roxy. A better class of films was booked, and the theater's fortunes improved. The all-time boxoffice-champion movie, Forever Amber, was booked during this period. That policy lasted only six years, however. Its next transformation was astounding. The stage area was covered with a 30-foot-by-30-foot ice floor for ice [skating] shows. The theater's seating capacity was reduced to 5,886. The Center Theater on Sixth Avenue was also converted to ice, and both theaters did successful business." He also invited the New York Philharmonic, then under conductor Dimitri Mitropoulos, to perform four shows a day for two weeks in September 1950 to excellent business.

Just two years from his final retirement, Balaban was still at the forefront of how to best ensure successful business in theatres. The March 18, 1950, edition of BoxOffice magazine offers Balaban's 18 tips for "personalized service"—and the need to make sure the patrons know about them. These included the original tenets that made B&K theatres so successful decades earlier—"the theatre should be a veritable fairyland of novelty, comfort, beauty and convenience", the on-site medical clinic, and the prohibition of gratuities, among them. Nearing the end of his career, Balaban persevered in demonstrating that the extension of courtesies to customers was a proven strategy for success.

== Personal life and death ==
In 1918, Balaban married Carrie Strump; they had three children Ida Joy (b. 1922), Cherry Blossom (b. 1924), and Bruce (b. 1928).

A.J. Balaban officially retired after nearly 10 years with the Roxy (1942–1952) and the family returned to Geneva. In 1962, Balaban and his wife were in New York. They dined with friends and returned to their residence at the Laurelton Hotel where Balaban suffered a heart attack. He died on November 1, 1962, and was entombed at Waldheim Cemetery in the Balaban Mausoleum (built by Rapp & Rapp). Obituaries appeared in publications around the country and the world, including The New York Times, Time magazine, and Variety. Time, November 9, 1962, identified Balaban as a "Midwest impresario of the 1920s movie-palace era who operated on the idea that theatres should be 'a thing of beauty, a fairyland,'" and in Variety, (November 7, 1962), Abel Green wrote, "Like a number of other greats of a great era of theatrical expansion, years of retirement and obscurity made A. J Balaban relatively an unknown to many newcomers. They might be prone to doubt his former importance."

At a Chicago Convention of Publix Theatres in July, 1930, his brother Barney Balaban (who would continue on with Paramount and become president in 1936,) said: "I found a Chicago Sunday Examiner clipping, dated 1916, two years before the opening of the Riviera, our first stage deluxe house. In this article, my brother A.J. is quoted as prophesying the type of theatre now represented in the Chicago, Tivoli, Uptown and Michigan and stating that within a few years, we would have one of these theatres erected on the West Side, another on the North Side, one South, and one in the Loop. I thought at the time that Abe was dreaming. In rapid succession followed the Tivoli, Chicago, Uptown, and other theatres and A.J.'s prophecy of 1916 became a fact."
