= Judy Balaban =

American actress and author (1932–2023)

- Born: Judith Rose Balaban; October 13, 1932; Chicago, Illinois, U.S.
- Died: October 19, 2023 (aged 91); Los Angeles, California, U.S.
- Spouses: Jay Kanter (m. 1953; div. 1961) Tony Franciosa (m. 1961; div. 1967) Don Quine (m. 1971; div. 1996)
- Children: 3
- Parent(s): Tillie Urkov Balaban; Barney Balaban
- Family: Leonard "Red" Balaban (brother); Burt Balaban (brother); Bob Balaban (cousin); A. J. Balaban (uncle); Elmer Balaban (uncle)

Judith Rose Balaban (October 13, 1932 – October 19, 2023) was an American actress and author of The Bridesmaids: Grace Kelly and Six Intimate Friends, about Grace Kelly. Balaban was a friend of Kelly's, through her marriage to Jay Kanter, and served as a bridesmaid at her wedding to Rainier III, Prince of Monaco in April 1956.

== Biography ==
Judith Rose Balaban was born to a Jewish family in Chicago, Illinois, the daughter of Tillie (née Urkov) and Barney Balaban. Her brothers were American jazz tubist and sousaphonist, Leonard "Red" Balaban and American film producer and director Burt Balaban. Balaban wrote The Bridesmaids: Grace Kelly and Six Intimate Friends. She appeared in the Showtime documentary ‘Becoming Cary Grant'.

Balaban was married three times. In the early 1950s she dated actor, Montgomery Clift. In 1953, she married Grace Kelly's talent agent Jay Kanter; they had two daughters, Victoria Kanter and Amy Kanter, before divorcing in 1961. In 1961, she married actor Tony Franciosa; they had one daughter, Nina Franciosa, before divorcing in 1967. In 1971, she married actor Don Quine; they divorced in 1996.

Balaban died at a Los Angeles hospital on October 19, 2023, at the age of 91.
