= Anthony Franciosa =

American actor (1928–2006)

Tony Franciosa
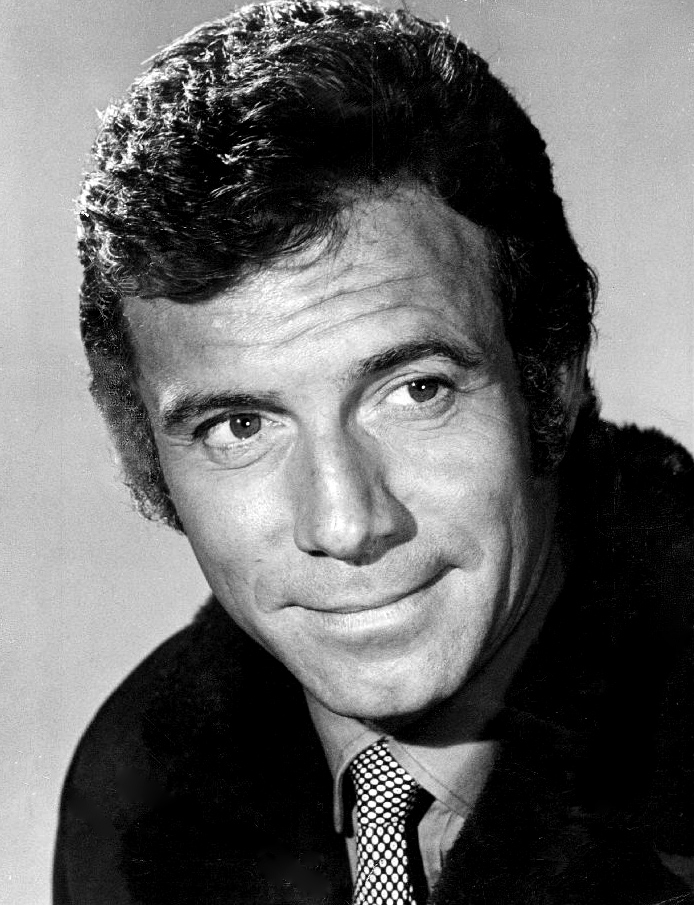
- Franciosa in 1969
- Born: Anthony George Papaleo; October 25, 1928; New York City, U.S.
- Died: January 19, 2006 (aged 77); Los Angeles, California, U.S.
- Other name: Tony Franciosa
- Education: Dramatic Workshop
- Occupation: Actor
- Years active: 1955–1996
- Spouses: Beatrice Bakalyar (m. 1952; div. 1957); Shelley Winters (m. 1957; div. 1960); Judy Balaban (m. 1961; div. 1967); Rita Thiel (m. 1970)
- Children: 3
- Awards: See below

Anthony George Franciosa (/frænsiˈoʊsə/; né Papaleo; October 25, 1928 – January 19, 2006), also billed as Tony Franciosa, was an American actor. He began his career on stage and made a breakthrough portraying the brother of the drug addict in the play A Hatful of Rain, which earned him a nomination for the Tony Award for Best Featured Actor in a Play. He reprised his role in its subsequent film adaptation, for which he won the 1957 Venice Film Festival Award for Best Actor, and was nominated for the Academy Award for Best Actor.

After relocating to Hollywood he made numerous feature films, including A Face in the Crowd (1957), The Long, Hot Summer (1958), and Career (1959), the latter for which he won the Golden Globe for Best Actor. On television, he played lead roles in five television series: the sitcom Valentine's Day (1964–65), drama The Name of the Game (1968–71), Search (1972–73), Matt Helm (1975), and Finder of Lost Loves (1984). Later in his career, he acted primarily in Italy, starring in the erotic drama The Cricket (1980) and Dario Argento's giallo Tenebrae (1982).

== Early life and education ==
He was born in the Little Italy district of New York to an Italian-American family. His grandparents emigrated from Melfi, Basilicata, southern Italy, in 1890. His parents separated when he was one and he was raised by his mother and aunt, adopting his mother's maiden name Franciosa.

After high school, he worked as a welder, ship steward and cook. At age 18 he was doing free dancing lessons at the YMCA, where he was offered a role in a production of The Seagull, and the experience made him want to be an actor. He studied privately for two years with Joseph Geigler. He then got a four-year scholarship at the Dramatic Workshop, which led to the New York Repertory Theatre.

== Career ==
=== Theatre ===
In 1948, Franciosa joined the Cherry Lane Theatre Group off Broadway (at the same time as actress Bea Arthur). Within two years, he had been accepted as a member of the Actors Studio, which would prove an invaluable resource throughout his career but it would be a few years more before Franciosa could make a living from acting. In the meantime, he accepted a variety of jobs which included being a waiter, dishwasher, day laborer, and messenger boy at CBD. He worked in Theatre of the Sky on Lake Tahoe. In 1950 he was in a San Francisco production of Detective Story.

In 1953, he made his Broadway debut in End as a Man alongside Ben Gazzara, and the following year in Wedding Breakfast (1954).

Franciosa began guest starring on TV shows such as Studio One in Hollywood, Kraft Theatre, Ford Star Jubilee (an adaptation of This Happy Breed with Noël Coward), and Goodyear Playhouse.

=== A Hatful of Rain ===
Franciosa's breakthrough role came when cast in the Actors Studio production of A Hatful of Rain (1955–56) under the direction of Elia Kazan. He played Polo, the brother of the drug addicted Johnny (Ben Gazzara). Shelley Winters played Johnny's wife and she would marry Franciosa the following year. Franciosa was nominated for a Tony Award for his performance.

Franciosa made his film debut in Elia Kazan's A Face in the Crowd (1957) alongside Andy Griffith, Patricia Neal, and Lee Remick. He followed it in MGM's This Could Be the Night (1957) as the romantic interest for Jean Simmons, under the direction of Robert Wise. He reprised his role in A Hatful of Rain in the film version, directed by Fred Zinnemann at 20th Century Fox, with Don Murray and Eva Marie Saint playing the roles originated by Gazzara and Winters. Hedda Hopper pointed out that these three films were made before the first one had been released. His performance in Hatful of Rain earned him an Academy Award nomination for Best Actor.

=== Film star ===
Franciosa supported Anna Magnani and Anthony Quinn in Wild Is the Wind (1957) directed by George Cukor, produced by Hal B. Wallis who put Franciosa under a multi-film contract. He then appeared with Paul Newman and Joanne Woodward in The Long Hot Summer (1958), playing Jody Varner, the son of Will Varner (Orson Welles), directed by Martin Ritt at Fox.

In December 1957, he spent 10 days in jail for hitting a press photographer in April of that year. However he was much in demand: In an interview in December, he said he owed Fox and MGM three films each over five years, Kazan two more films, and Wallis one film a year over seven years.

He played Francisco Goya in MGM's The Naked Maja (1958) with Ava Gardner, which earned Franciosa $250,000 in acting fees due to production delays. He made a second film for Wallis, Career (1959) with Dean Martin and Shirley MacLaine, then The Story on Page One (1959) with Rita Hayworth for Clifford Odets at Fox.

He was meant to star in Orpheus Descending (which became The Fugitive Kind) with Anna Magnani, but the producers decided to cast Marlon Brando, and Franciosa was paid out $75,000. He was mentioned as a possibility for one of the roles in The Magnificent Seven and for the title role in a proposed Simon Bolivar biopic that Dino De Laurentiis was going to make.

In 1959, he served 30 days at an open-prison farm for possession of marijuana. The same year, he was in a car accident.

Franciosa returned to television to appear in Heaven Can Wait, an adaptation of Here Comes Mr Jordan (1960), then in Cradle Song (1960). He supported Gina Lollobrigida in MGM's Go Naked in the World (1961), which lost money. He was top-billed in the Italian Careless (1962) with Claudia Cardinale and MGM's Period of Adjustment (1962) with Jane Fonda, Franciosa's first film for that studio which made a profit. In August 1963, he addressed a civil rights rally in Alabama alongside Marlon Brando and Paul Newman.

=== Television ===
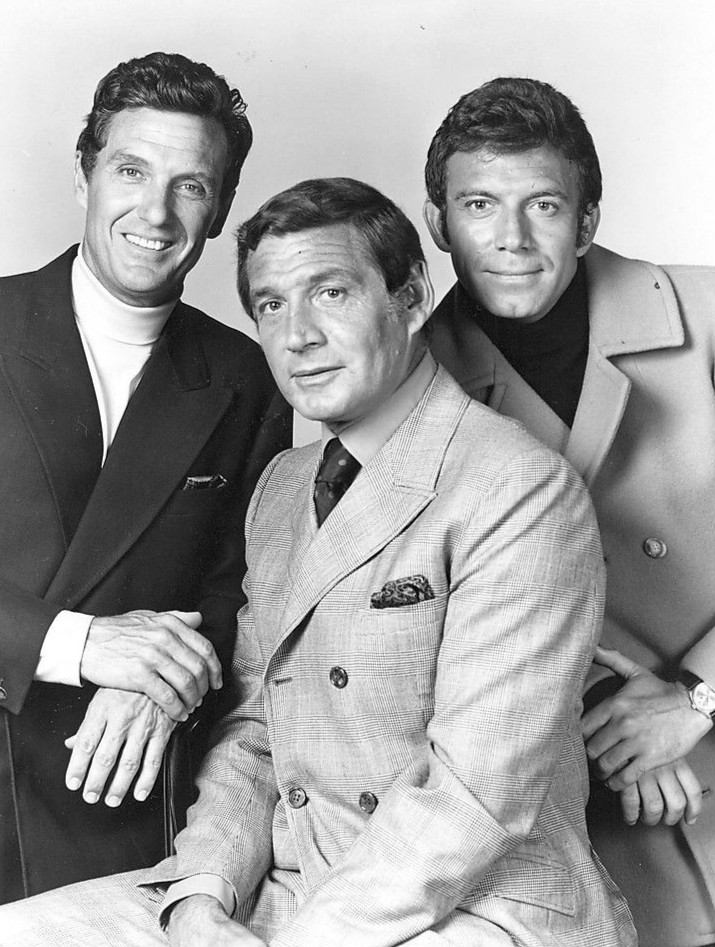
Tony Franciosa with Robert Stack (left) and Gene Barry in the TV series The Name of the Game (1968)

Franciosa guest starred on The DuPont Show of the Week, Arrest and Trial, Breaking Point, The Greatest Show on Earth, and Bob Hope Presents the Chrysler Theatre. He had supporting parts in two films for Fox: Rio Conchos (1964) with Stuart Whitman and Richard Boone, and The Pleasure Seekers (1964) with Ann-Margret and Carol Lynley.

He starred in a TV series Valentine's Day (1964–65). When that ended he had support parts in A Man Could Get Killed (1966) with James Garner and Assault on a Queen (1966) with Frank Sinatra. He was leading man to Ann-Margret in The Swinger (1966) at Paramount and Raquel Welch in Fathom (1967) at Fox. In a 1966 interview he confessed that Hollywood stardom had come a little too early: "It was an incredible amount of attention, and I wasn't quite mature enough psychologically or emotionally for it."

He starred in Universal's Fame Is the Name of the Game (1966), then a spaghetti Western at Universal, A Man Called Gannon (1968), a drama with Jacqueline Bisset at Fox, The Sweet Ride (1968), and a war film at Universal, In Enemy Country (1968). Producer David Dortort was on the verge of casting him as Cameron Mitchell's best friend and brother-in-law, Manolito Montoya, on the western, The High Chaparral, if Henry Darrow did not make it to the set in time. Darrow did.

Franciosa returned to regular series with The Name of the Game (1968–71) (based on Fame Is the Name of the Game), as lead role of charismatic but doggedly determined star reporter Jeff Dillon, alternating the regular lead spot with Gene Barry and Robert Stack. The three leading actors were never onscreen at the same time at any point in the series. He was fired from the show in 1970 because of his temper. He was in Web of the Spider (1971), an Italian horror film, then a series of TV movies: The Deadly Hunt (1971), Earth II (1971), and The Catcher (1972). He had a support part in the action film Across 110th Street (1972).

Franciosa had a further alternating lead role in a TV series, this time rotating with Hugh O'Brian and Doug McClure, as agent Nick Bianco in Search (1972). When that ended he supported Peter Sellers in Ghost in the Noonday Sun (1973) and The Drowning Pool (1975) with former The Long, Hot Summer co-star Paul Newman.

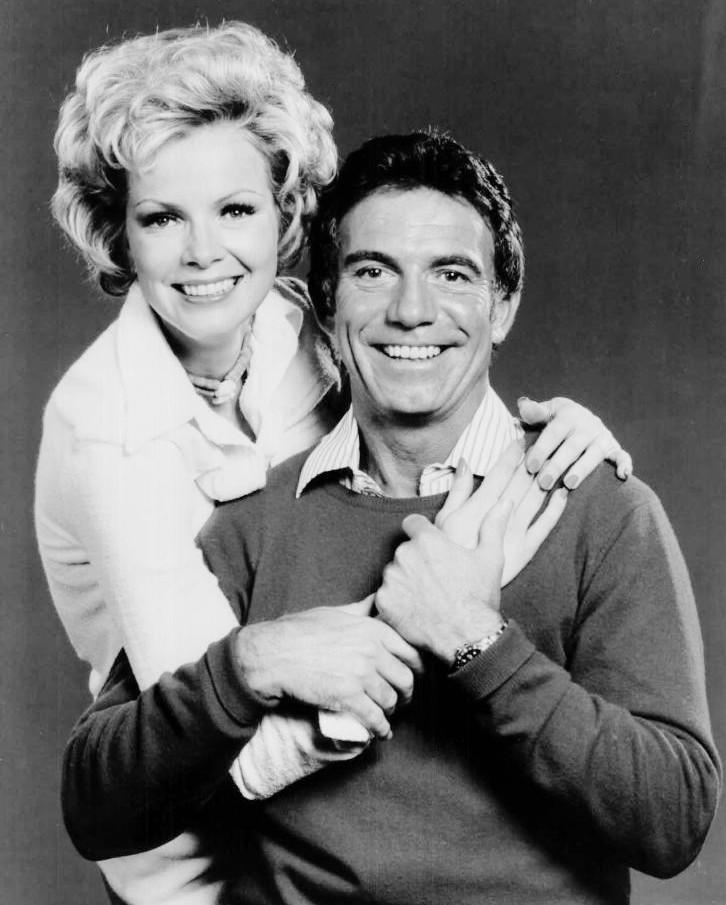
With Laraine Stephens in a publicity photo for the TV series Matt Helm in 1975

He had his own series with Matt Helm (1975), a television version of the spy-spoof theatrical films that starred Dean Martin, but it only lasted 14 episodes. He was in Curse of the Black Widow (1977), three part ABC mini series Aspen (1977), Wheels (1978), Firepower (1979), The World Is Full of Married Men (1979), The Cricket (1980), Death Wish II (1982), Tenebrae (1982), and Julie Darling (1983).

In his memoir, From I Love Lucy to Shōgun and Beyond: Tales from the Other Side of the Camera, Jerry London stated that Franciosa could not remember his lines during the shooting of the television movie Wheels, so co-star Rock Hudson had to hold up cue cards for him during one scene in a car.

=== Later career ===
Franciosa starred in the Aaron Spelling-produced series Finder of Lost Loves (1984–85). He could be seen in Stagecoach (1986) and episodes of Hotel, The Love Boat, and Jake and the Fatman. In the 1985 revival of The Twilight Zone, he appeared in the third-season episode "Crazy as a Soup Sandwich", playing a gangster who is revealed to be the ultimate demon. Later performances included Blood Vows: The Story of a Mafia Wife (1987), Death House (1988), Fashion Crime (1989), Ghost Writer (1989), Backstreet Dreams (1990), and Double Threat (1992). In 1990–91, he portrayed Colonel Doctor Otternschlag in the U.S. national tour of the musical Grand Hotel at the Kennedy Center in Washington, D.C., and other national tour locations.

His final film was City Hall, a 1996 drama starring Al Pacino and John Cusack, in which he portrayed a crime boss.

In his autobiography The Garner Files, actor James Garner stated that Franciosa, on the set of A Man Could Get Killed, constantly abused the stunt crew by not pulling punches in fight scenes, resulting in a physical confrontation with Garner.

== Personal life ==
Franciosa was married four times, and had three children. His first marriage to Beatrice Bakalyar in 1952 ended in divorce in 1957. On May 4, 1957, he married actress Shelley Winters; the couple divorced in 1960. He next wed the former Judith Balaban, daughter of Barney Balaban, and author of the book The Bridesmaids about her friend Princess Grace of Monaco, in whose wedding she served as a bridesmaid. The marriage resulted in the birth of Franciosa's only daughter, Nina. His fourth and final marriage was to Rita Thiel on November 27, 1970 -- coincidentally, the day his final episode of The Name Of The Game aired. The marriage lasted until his death in 2006. The pair had two sons, organic farmer Marco and actor Christopher.

When asked about Franciosa's hair-trigger temper, Thiel said "He was never taught how to control his temper ... I changed him a lot ... We still have good fights once in a while, but I can scream back at him."

Franciosa, reflecting about Thiel's influence on him, said

"It took years of therapy and simply living through things to finally accept and enjoy myself. My wife Rita's influence has been profound in that process. Her family was a product of The Great Disaster — World War II. She emerged from the flames with a remarkable buoyancy. Each day she rises with an optimism, a serenity toward life that is certainly contagious. Does that sound romantic? If so, so be it."

During his later years, Franciosa lived in the Brentwood neighborhood of Los Angeles.

=== Death ===
Franciosa died on January 19, 2006, aged 77 at UCLA Medical Center after suffering a massive stroke. His death occurred five days after the death of his former wife, actress Shelley Winters.

== Selected filmography ==
- This Could Be the Night (1957) - Tony Armotti
- A Face in the Crowd (1957) - Joey DePalma
- A Hatful of Rain (1957) - Polo Pope
- Wild Is the Wind (1957) - Bene
- The Long, Hot Summer (1958) - Jody Varner
- The Naked Maja (1958) - Francisco Jose De Goya
- Career (1959) - Sam Lawson
- The Story on Page One (1959) - Victor Santini
- Go Naked in the World (1961) - Nick Stratton
- Careless (1962) - Emilio Brentani
- Period of Adjustment (1962) - Ralph Bates
- Rio Conchos (1964) - Rodriguez
- The Pleasure Seekers (1964) - Emilio Lacayo
- A Man Could Get Killed (1966) - Steve / Antonio
- Assault on a Queen (1966) - Vic Rossiter
- The Swinger (1966) - Ric Colby
- Fame Is the Name of the Game (1966) - Jeff Dillon
- Fathom (1967) - Peter Merriwether
- A Man Called Gannon (1968) - Gannon
- The Sweet Ride (1968) - Collie Ransom
- In Enemy Country (1968) - Charles
- Web of the Spider (1971) - Alan Foster
- Earth II (1971) - Frank Karger
- Across 110th Street (1972) - Nick D'Salvio
- Search (1972–1973) - Nick Bianco
- Ghost in the Noonday Sun (1973) - Pierre Rodriguez
- The Drowning Pool (1975) - Broussard
- Aspen (1977) - Alex Budde
- Curse of the Black Widow (1977) - Mark Higbie
- Firepower (1979) - Dr. Charles Félix
- The World Is Full of Married Men (1979) - David Cooper
- The Cricket (1980) - Annibale Meneghetti, detto Ulisse
- Help Me Dream (1981) - Ray
- Death Wish II (1982) - Herman Baldwin, LA Police Commissioner
- Kiss My Grits (1982) - Charlie Karkas
- Tenebrae (1982) - Peter Neal
- Julie Darling (1983) - Harold Wilding
- Blood Vows: The Story of a Mafia Wife (1987) - Lou Di Luca
- Zombie Death House (1987) - Vic Moretti
- La morte è di moda (1989) - Commissioner Rizzo
- Ghost Writer (1989) - Vincent Carbone
- Backstreet Dreams (1990) - Angelo
- Double Threat (1993) - Crocker Scott
- El caçador furtiu (1995) - Walter
- City Hall (1996) - Paul Zapatti

== Awards and nominations ==
Institution	Year	Category	Work	Result	Ref.
Academy Awards	1958	Best Actor	A Hatful of Rain (film)	Nominated	
Golden Globes	1958	Best Actor in a Motion Picture – Drama	A Hatful of Rain (film)	Nominated	
Golden Globes	1960	Best Actor in a Motion Picture – Drama	Career	Won	
Golden Globes	1965	Best Actor in a Motion Picture – Drama	Rio Conchos	Nominated	
Laurel Awards	1958	Top New Male Personality	—N/a	Nominated	
Outer Critics Circle Awards	1956	Outstanding Lead Performer in a Broadway Play	A Hatful of Rain (film)	Won	
Theatre World Awards	1956	—N/a	A Hatful of Rain (play)	Won	
Tony Awards	1956	Best Featured Actor in a Play	A Hatful of Rain (play)	Nominated	
Venice Film Festival	1957	Best Actor	A Hatful of Rain (film)	Won	
Venice Film Festival	1957	New Cinema Award	A Hatful of Rain (film)	Won	
