= Jay Kanter =

American film producer (1926–2024)

- Born: Jay Ira Kanter; December 12, 1926; Chicago, Illinois, U.S.
- Died: August 6, 2024 (aged 97); Beverly Hills, California, U.S.
- Occupations: Film producer; studio executive; agent
- Spouses: Judy Balaban (m. 1953; div. 1961) Kit Bennett (m. 1965; died 2014)
- Children: 4

Jay Ira Kanter (December 12, 1926 – August 6, 2024) was an American film producer and talent agent, best known for his long association with Alan Ladd Jr. He was an agent at MCA for a number of years. He is also known for his biographical works such as Grace Kelly: The American Princess (1987), Brando (2007), and Marlon Brando: An Actor Named Desire (2014).

His career provided the inspiration for the television sitcom The Famous Teddy Z.

== Personal life ==
Kanter was born to a Jewish family in Chicago, Illinois. He was married to Judy Balaban (daughter of Barney Balaban) from 1953 until they divorced in 1961. Then he was married to Kit Bennett from 1965 until her death in 2014. He had two daughters with Balaban, Amy and Victoria.

Kanter died at his home in Beverly Hills, California, on August 6, 2024, at the age of 97.

== Selected credits ==
- Villain (1971) - producer
- Fear Is the Key (1972) - producer
