= Don Quine =

American actor and novelist

- Quine in The Virginian, 1967
- Born: Donald Robert Charles Quine; September 11, 1938 (age 88); Fennville, Michigan, U.S.
- Occupations: Actor; writer; novelist
- Years active: 1959–1993
- Known for: Peyton Place; The Virginian
- Spouses: Carole Kane (m. 1959; div. 1966) Judy Balaban (m. 1971; div. 1996) Sharon Ann Quine (m. 2014)
- Children: 3
- Website: Don Quine website

Donald Robert Charles Quine (born September 11, 1938) is an American author, actor, and sports promoter. He is known for his television roles playing Joe Chernak in Peyton Place and Stacey Grainger in The Virginian. Quine also was the president of the Professional Karate Association (PKA) whose Kick of the 80’s weekly fight series on ESPN ran for close to a decade. He wrote American Karate, a book on self-defense.

== Early life ==
Quine was born on September 11, 1938, in Fennville, Michigan, to Irene Elizabeth Quine (1916-2008) and Robert Corkill Quine (1895-1943).

== Acting career ==
Quine attended a semester of pre-medical studies at the University of Colorado. Later, while at Wagner College in Staten Island, Quine became involved in the Theatre Arts program. This led him to New York City where he studied at the American Theatre Wing before landing the role of Tom Stark in Robert Penn Warren’s Off-Broadway premiere of All the King’s Men at the East 74th Street Theater in 1959.

== Select filmography and television work ==
- Torch Song (1993) as Joe (Movie)
- Hawaii Five-O (1970) as Don Miles
- Medical Center (1969) as Tim Martin
- Lancer (1968) as Corey
- Insight (1968) as Mike
- The Virginian (1966–68) as Stacy Granger (55 episodes)
- Peyton Place (1965–66) as Joe Chernak (16 episodes)
- The F.B.I. (1966) as Frank Collins
- 12 O'Clock High (1965–66) as Lt. Thourneau and Sergeant Hanson
- The Fugitive (1964–66) as Sandy/Vin/Joe
