= South Side, Chicago =

Southern part of Chicago, Illinois, US

South Side
- District
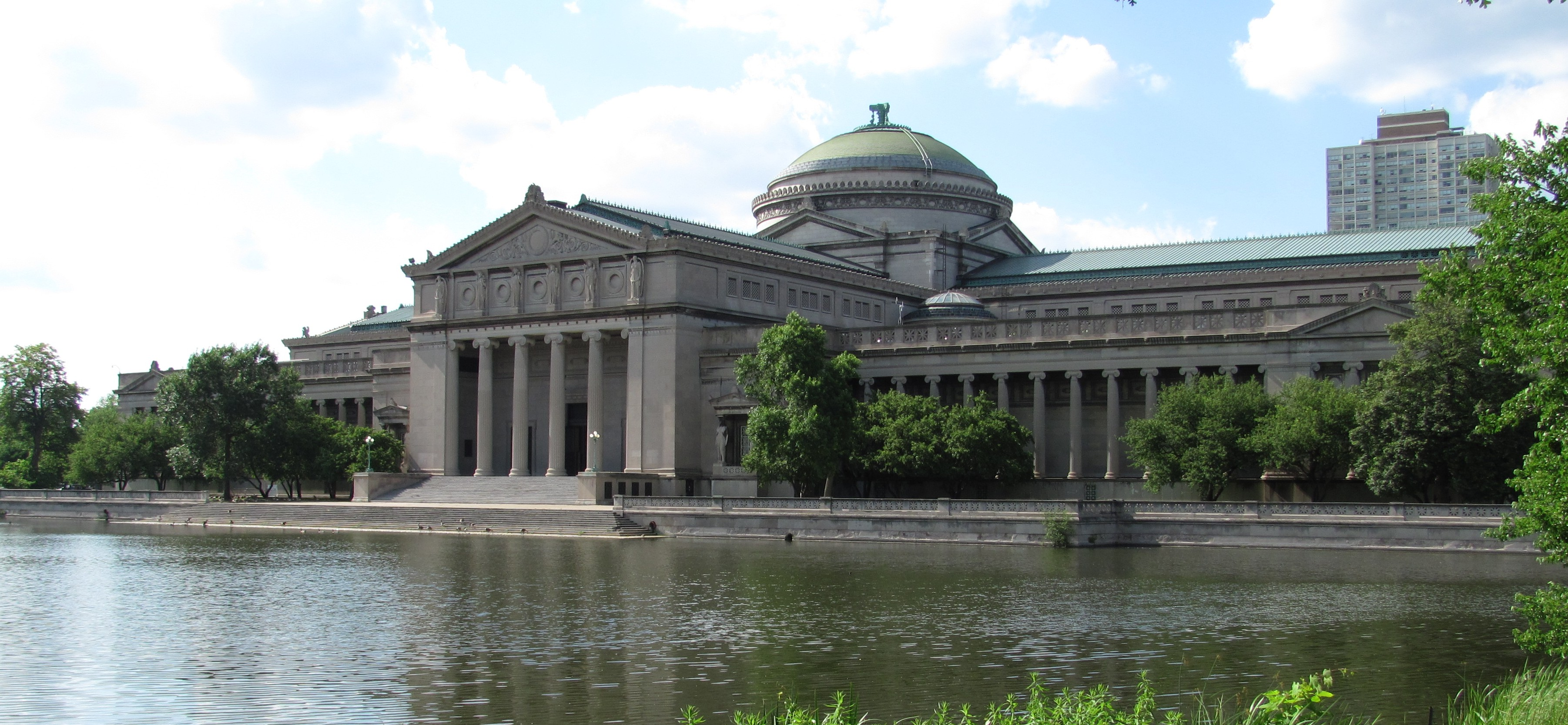
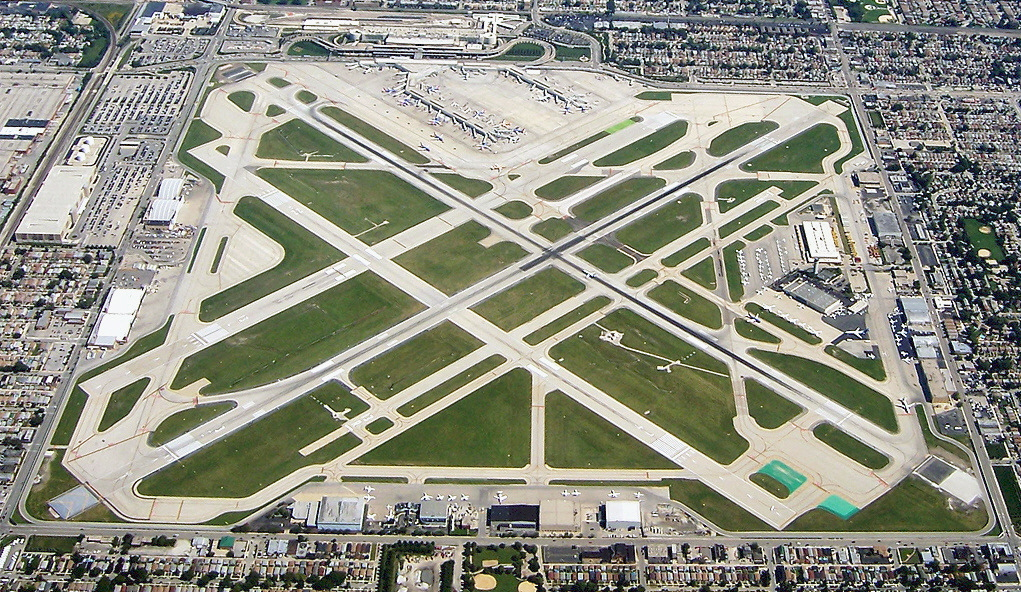
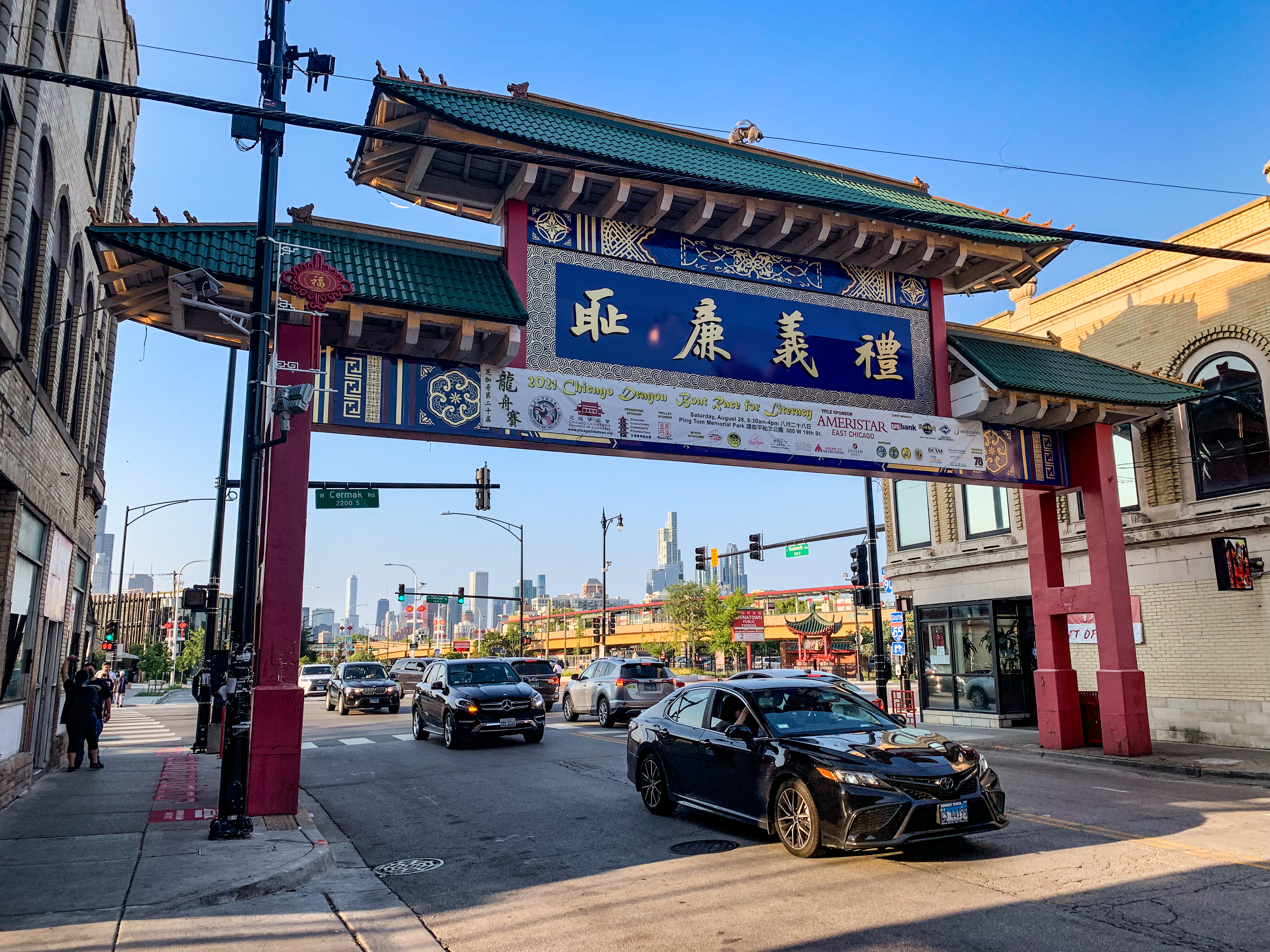
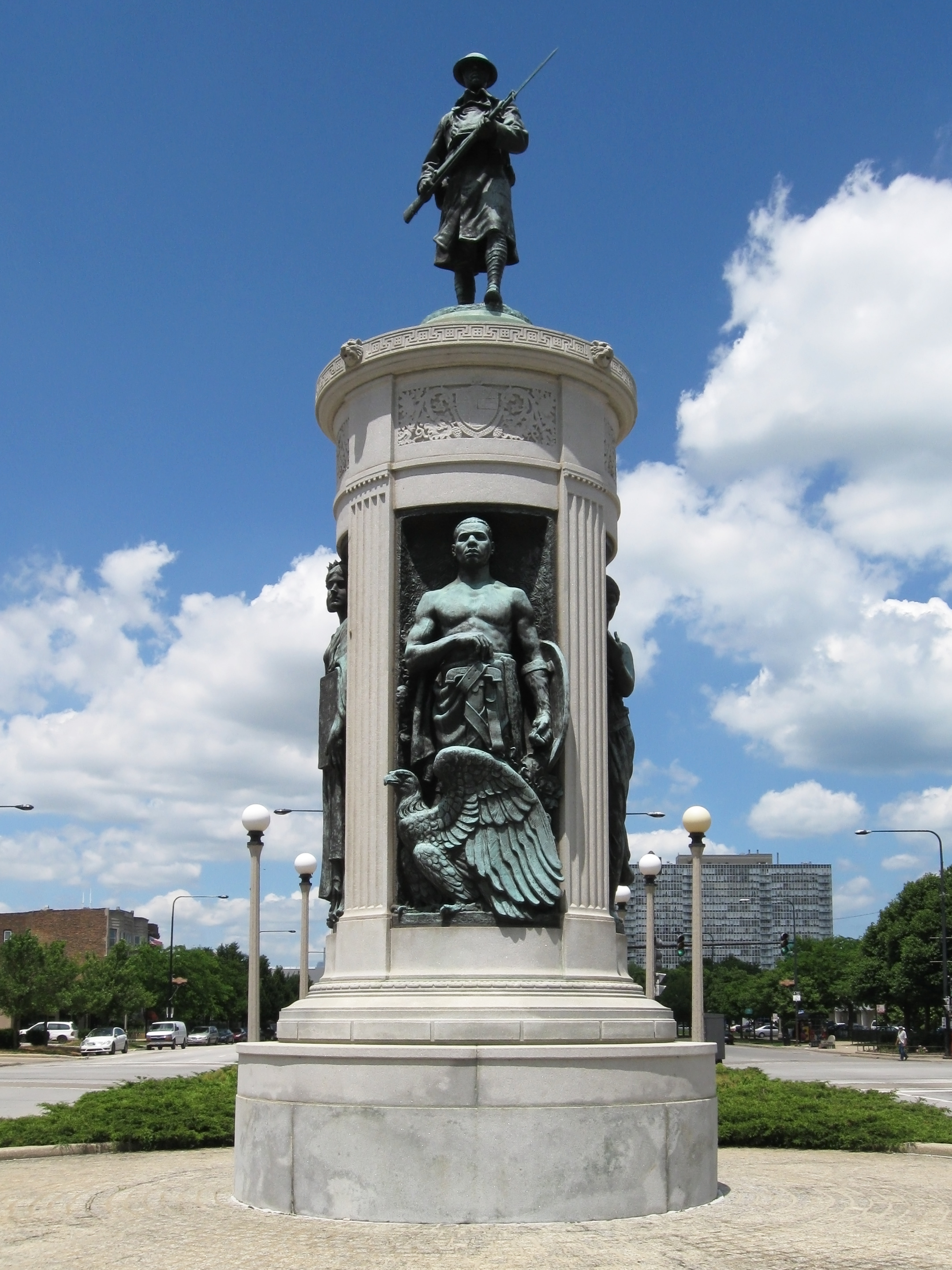
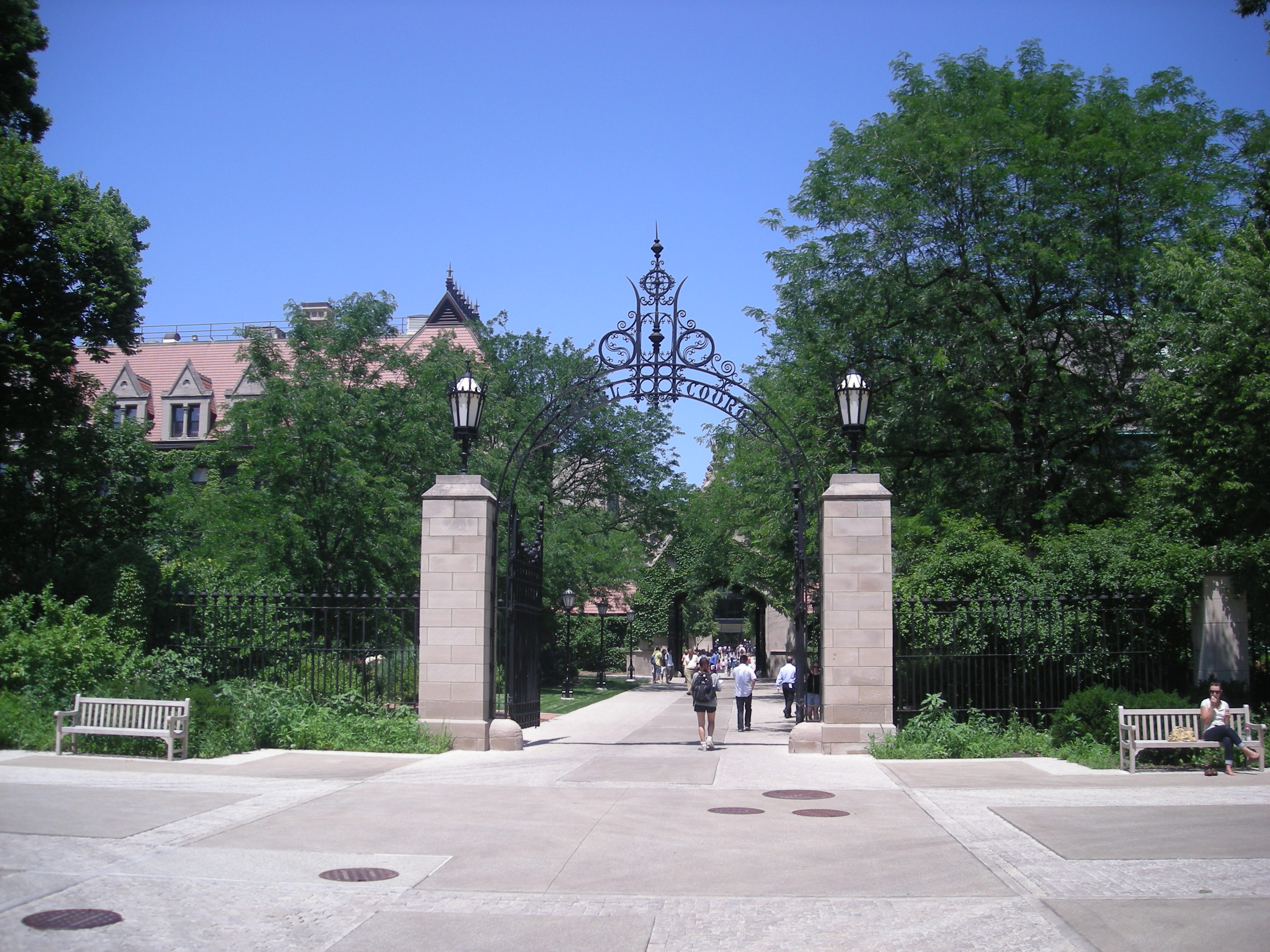
- Museum of Science and Industry Midway Airport Chinatown Victory Monument The University of Chicago
- Interactive map of South Side
- Coordinates: 41°45′56″N 87°37′40″W
- Country: United States
- State: Illinois
- County: Cook
- City: Chicago
- Elevation: 597 ft (182 m)

Population (2014)
  - Total: ~1 million
- Time zone: UTC– 06:00 (CST)
  - Summer (DST): UTC– 05:00 (CDT)

The South Side is one of the three major geographical "sides" of the city of Chicago, Illinois, United States. Geographically, it is the largest of the three sides of the city, with the other two being the North and West Sides. It radiates from and lies south of the city's downtown area, the Chicago Loop.

Much of the South Side came from the city's annexation of townships such as Hyde Park. The city's Sides have historically been divided by the Chicago River and its branches. The South Side of Chicago was originally defined as all of the city south of the main branch of the Chicago River, but it now excludes the Loop. The South Side has a varied ethnic composition and a great variety of income levels and other demographic measures. It has a reputation for crime, although most crime is contained within certain neighborhoods, not throughout the South Side itself, and residents range from affluent to middle class to poor. South Side neighborhoods such as Armour Square, Back of the Yards, Bridgeport, and Pullman host more blue collar and middle-class residents, while Hyde Park, the Jackson Park Highlands District, Kenwood, Beverly, Mount Greenwood, and west Morgan Park range from middle class to more affluent residents.

The South Side features professional sports teams, landmark buildings, museums, educational institutions, medical institutions, beaches, and major parts of Chicago's parks system. The South Side has numerous bus routes and 'L' train lines via the Chicago Transit Authority, it hosts Midway International Airport, and includes several Metra rail commuter lines. There are portions of the U.S. Interstate Highway System and also national highways such as Lake Shore Drive.

== Boundaries ==
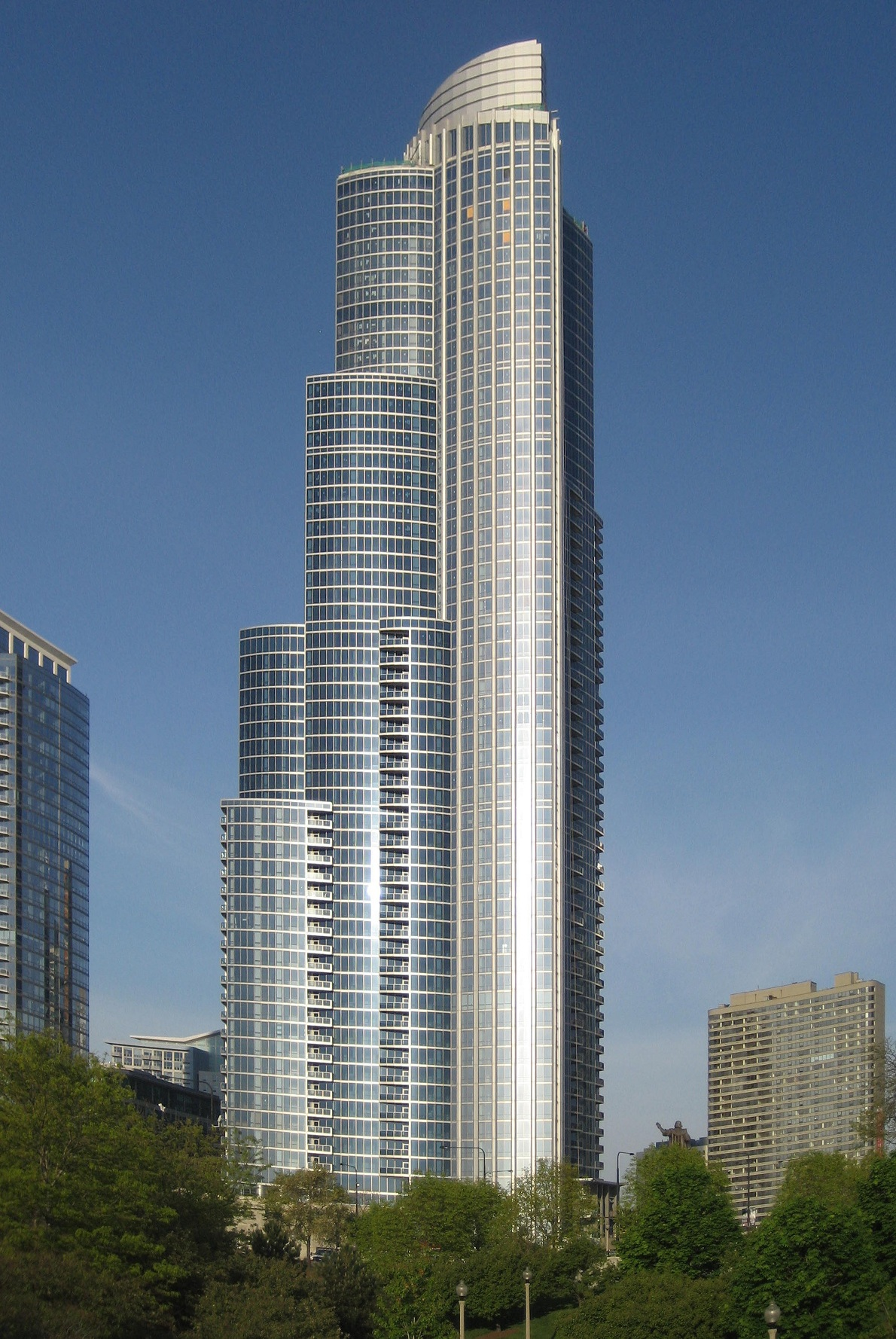
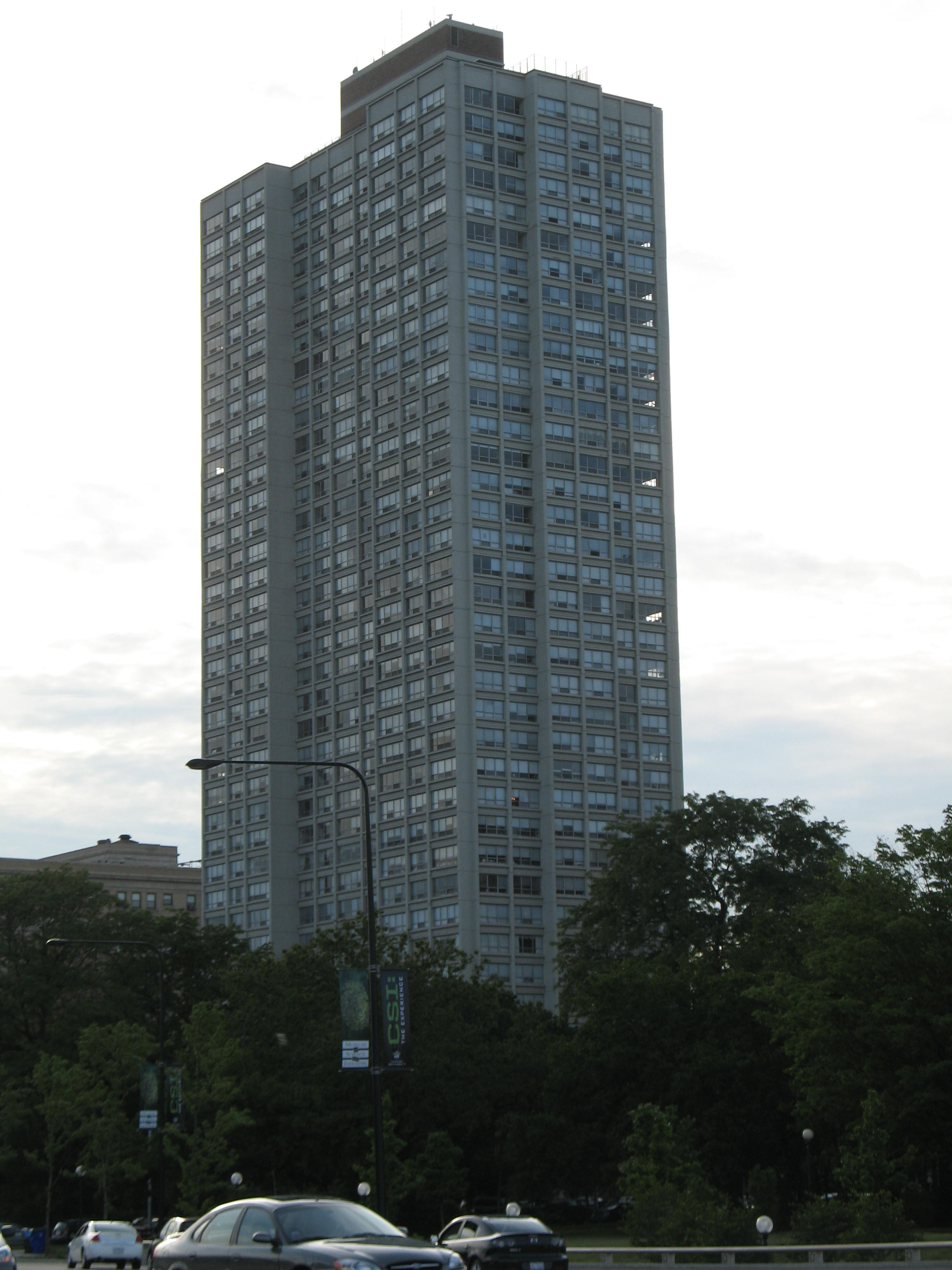
In 2008, One Museum Park, left, May 2008, replaced 1700 East 56th Street, right, 2007, as the tallest South Side building. It also replaced 340 on the Park as the tallest all-residential building in Chicago.

There is some debate as to the South Side's boundaries. Originally the sides were taken from the banks of the Chicago River. The city's address numbering system uses a grid demarcating Madison Street as the east–west axis and State Street as the north–south axis. Madison is in the middle of the Loop. As a result, much of the downtown "Loop" district is south of Madison Street, and the river, but the Loop is usually excluded from any of the Sides.

Community areas by number (top) and side

One definition has the South Side beginning at Roosevelt Road, at the Loop's southern boundary, with the community area known as the Near South Side immediately adjacent. Another definition, taking into account that much of the Near South Side is in effect part of the commercial district extending in an unbroken line from the South Loop, locates the boundary immediately south of 18th Street or Cermak Road, where Chinatown in the Armour Square community area begins.

Lake Michigan and the Indiana state line provide eastern boundaries. The southern border changed over time because of Chicago's evolving city limits. The city limits are now at 138th Street, in Riverdale and Hegewisch. The South Side is larger in area than the North and West Sides combined.

=== Neighborhoods ===
Out of 77 community areas in the city, the South Side of Chicago comprises a total of 42 neighborhoods, with some divided into different regions of the area or consolidated into Chicago as part of the annexation of various townships within Cook County.

==== South Side ====
• Armour Square	• Bridgeport	Chinatown
• Douglas	• Englewood	• Fuller Park
• Grand Boulevard	• Greater Grand Crossing	• Hyde Park
• Kenwood	• Oakland	• South Shore
• Washington Park	• Woodlawn

==== Southwest Side ====
• Archer Heights	• Brighton Park	• Chicago Lawn
• Clearing	• Gage Park	• Garfield Ridge
• McKinley Park	• New City	• West Elsdon
• West Englewood	• West Lawn

==== Far Southwest Side ====
• Ashburn	• Auburn Gresham	• Beverly
• Morgan Park	• Mount Greenwood	• Washington Heights

==== Far Southeast Side ====
• Avalon Park	• Burnside	• Calumet Heights
• Chatham	• East Side	• Hegewisch
• Pullman	• Riverdale	• Roseland
• South Chicago	• South Deering	• West Pullman

=== Subdivisions ===
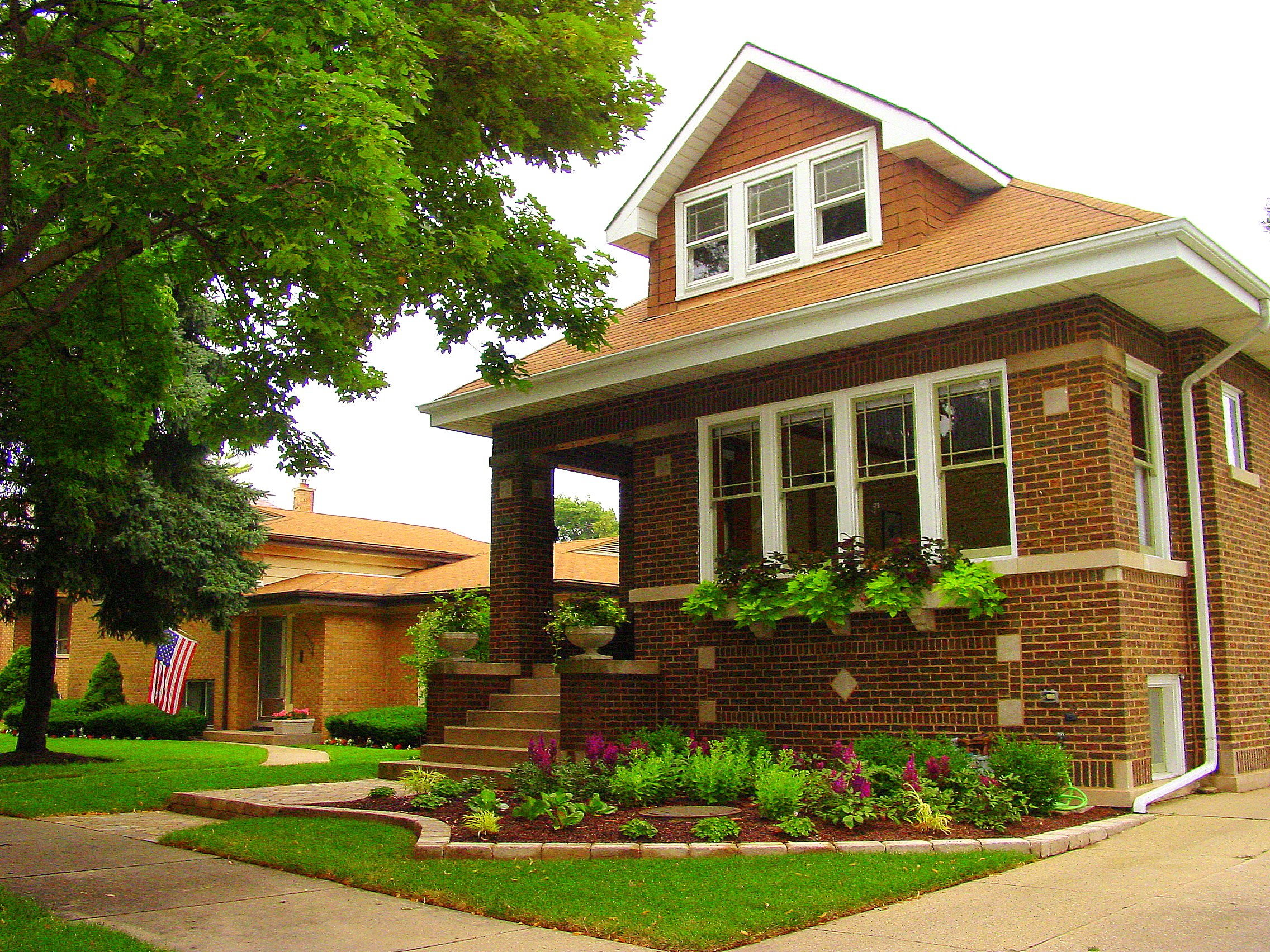
A typical Chicago Bungalow, examples of which are found in abundance on the South Side.

The exact boundaries dividing the Southwest, South, and Southeast Sides vary by source. If primarily racial lines are followed, the South Side can generally be divided into a White and Hispanic Southwest Side, a largely Black South Side and a smaller, more racially diverse Southeast Side centered on the East Side community area and including the adjacent community areas of South Chicago, South Deering and Hegewisch.

The differing interpretations of the boundary between the South and Southwest Sides are due to a lack of a definite natural or artificial boundary. One source states that the boundary is Western Avenue or the railroad tracks adjacent to Western Avenue. This border extends further south to a former railroad right of way paralleling Beverly Avenue and then Interstate 57.

The Southwest Side of Chicago is a subsection of the South Side comprising mainly white, Black, and Hispanic neighborhoods, usually dominated by one of these races. On the Southwest Side exclusively, the northern portion has a high concentration of Hispanics, the western portion has a high concentration of whites, and the eastern portion has a high concentration of blacks. Architecturally, the Southwest Side is distinguished by the tract of Chicago's Bungalow Belt, which runs through it.

Archer Heights, a Polish enclave along Archer Avenue, which leads toward Midway Airport, is located on the Southwest Side of the city, as are Beverly and Morgan Park, home to a large concentration of Irish Americans.

== History ==
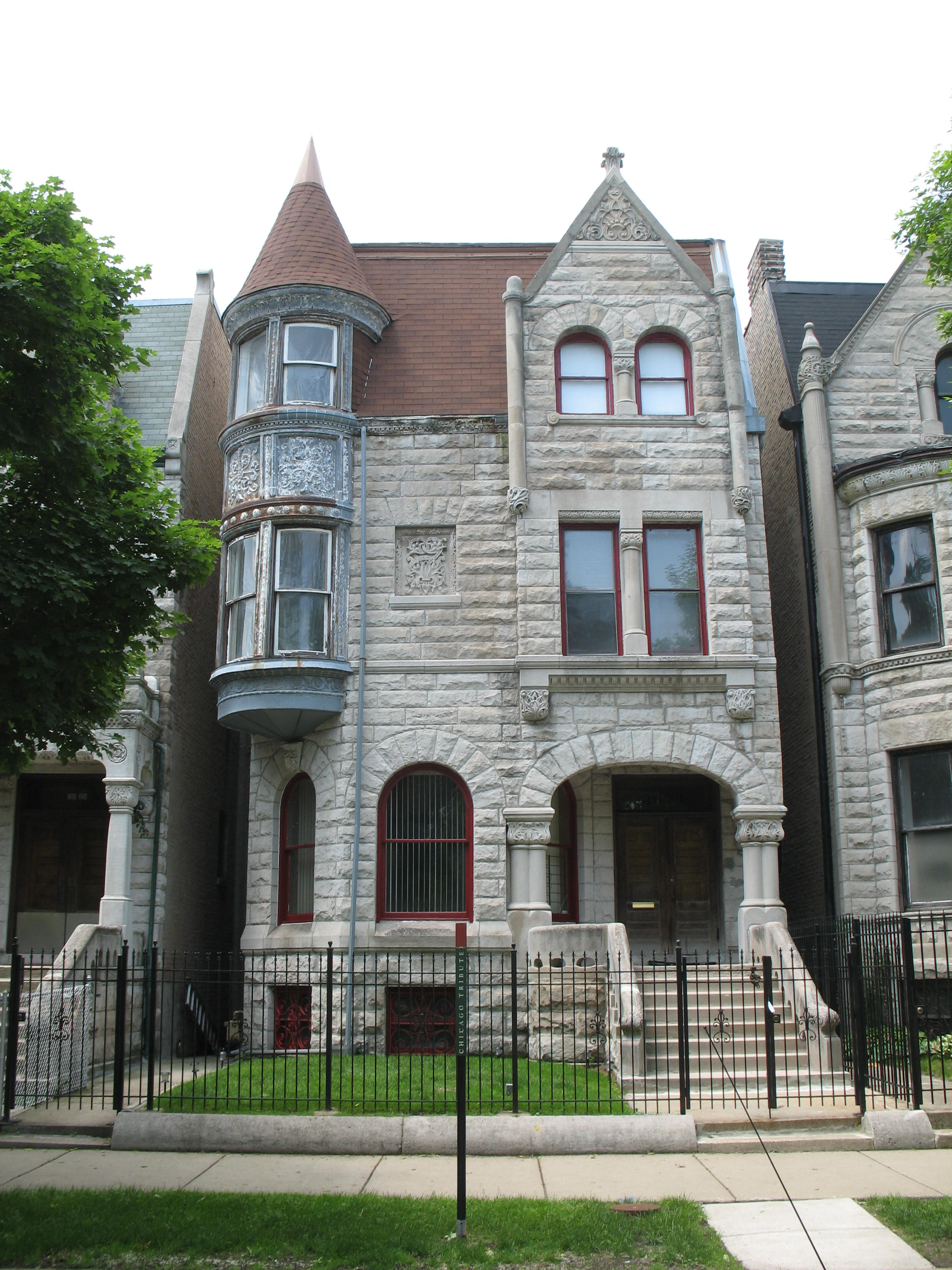
Ida Wells lived in the Ida Wells House, a Chicago Landmark in the Bronzeville historic district.

With its factories, steel mills and meat-packing plants, the South Side saw a sustained period of immigration which began around the 1840s and continued through World War II. Irish, Italian, Polish, Lithuanian and Yugoslav immigrants, in particular, settled in neighborhoods adjacent to industrial zones.

The Illinois Constitution gave rise to townships that provided municipal services in 1850. Several settlements surrounding Chicago incorporated as townships to better serve their residents. Growth and prosperity overburdened many local government systems. In 1889, most of these townships determined that they would be better off as part of a larger city of Chicago. Lake View, Jefferson, Lake, Hyde Park Townships and the Austin portion of Cicero voted to be annexed by the city in the June 29, 1889, elections.

After the Civil War freed millions of slaves, during Reconstruction Black southerners migrated to Chicago and caused the Black population to nearly quadruple from 4,000 to 15,000 between 1870 and 1890.

The South Side in 1906, shortly before the first Great Migration (which began around 1910), adapted from Rufus Blanchard's full Map of Chicago with the New Street Names.

In the 20th century, the numbers expanded with the Great Migration, as Blacks left the agrarian South seeking a better future in the industrial North, including the South Side. By 1910, the Black population in Chicago reached 40,000, with 78% residing in the Black Belt. Extending 30 blocks, mostly between 31st and 55th Streets, along State Street, but only a few blocks wide, it developed into a vibrant community dominated by black businesses, music, food and culture. As more Blacks moved into the South Side, descendants of earlier immigrants, such as ethnic Irish, began to move out. Later housing pressures and civic unrest caused more whites to leave parts of the South Side in white flight and the city. Older residents of means moved to newer suburban housing as new migrants entered the city, driving further demographic changes.

The South Side was racially segregated for many decades. During the 1920s and 1930s, housing cases on the South Side such as Hansberry v. Lee, 311 U.S. 32 (1940), went to the U. S. Supreme Court. The case, which reset the limitations of res judicata, successfully challenged racial restrictions in the Washington Park Subdivision by reopening them for legal argument. Blacks resided in Bronzeville (around 35th and State Streets) in an area called "the Black Belt". After World War II, blacks spread across the South Side; its center, east, and western portions. The Black Belt arose from discriminatory real estate practices by whites against Blacks and other racial groups.

In the early 1960s, during the tenure of then Mayor Richard J. Daley, the construction of the Dan Ryan Expressway created controversy. Many perceived the highway's location as an intentional physical barrier between white and Black neighborhoods, particularly as the Dan Ryan divided Daley's own neighborhood, the traditionally Irish Bridgeport, from Bronzeville.

The economic conditions that led to migration into the South Side were not sustained. Mid-century industrial restructuring in meat packing and the steel industry cost many jobs. Blacks who became educated and achieved middle-class jobs also left after the Civil Rights Movement to other parts of the city.

Street gangs have been prominent in some South Side neighborhoods for over a century, beginning with those of Irish immigrants, who established the first territories in a struggle against other European and Black migrants. Some other neighborhoods stayed relatively safe for a big city. By the 1960s, gangs such as the Vice Lords began to improve their public image, shifting from criminal ventures to operating social programs funded by government and private grants. However, in the 1970s gangs returned to violence and the drug trade. By 2000, traditionally all-male gangs crossed gender lines to include about 20% females.

=== Housing ===
By the 1930s, the city of Chicago boasted that over 25% of its residential structures were less than 10 years old, many of which were bungalows. These continued to be built in the working-class South Side into the 1960s. Studio apartments, with Murphy beds and kitchenettes or Pullman kitchens, comprised a large part of the housing supply during and after the Great Depression, especially in the "Black Belt". The South Side had a history of philanthropic subsidized housing dating back to 1919.

The United States Congress passed the Housing Act of 1949 to fund and improve public housing. CHA produced a plan of citywide projects, which was rejected by the Chicago City Council's white aldermen who opposed public housing in their wards. This led to a CHA policy of construction of family housing only in Black residential areas, concentrated in parts of the South and West Sides. Historian Arnold R. Hirsch said the CHA was "a bulwark of segregation that helped sustain Chicago's 'second ghetto'".

=== Gentrification ===
Gentrification of parts of the Douglas community area has bolstered the Black Metropolis-Bronzeville District. Gentrification in various parts of the South Side has displaced many Black citizens. The South Side offers numerous housing cooperatives. Hyde Park has several middle-income co-ops and other South Side regions have limited equity (subsidized, price-controlled) co-ops. These regions experienced condominium construction and conversion in the 1970s and 1980s.

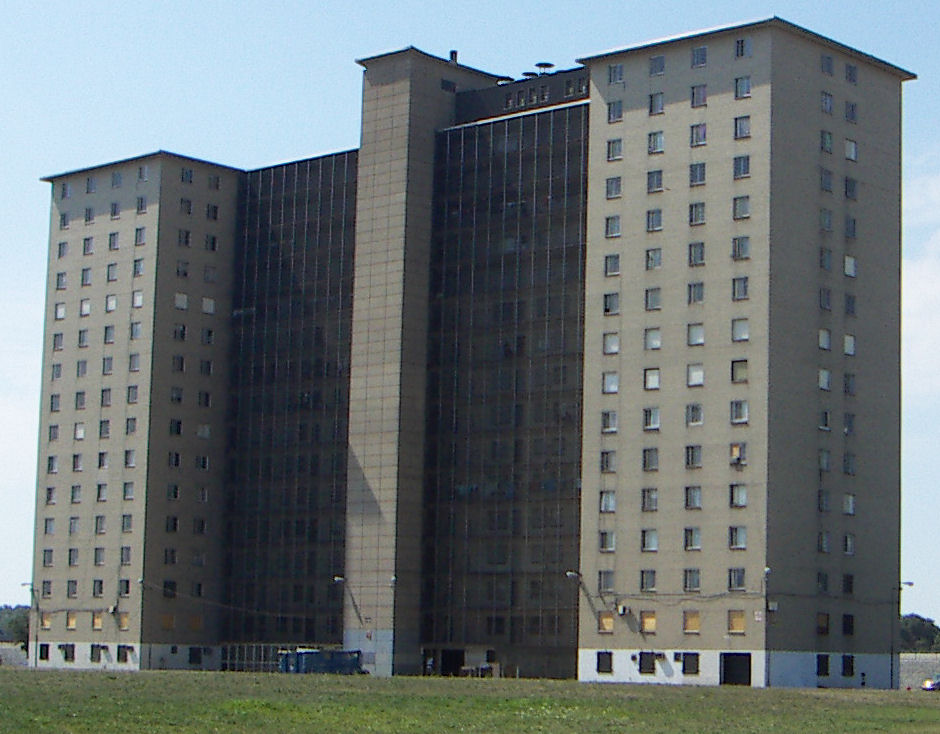
Last Robert Taylor Home, 2005, since demolished

In the late 20th century, the South Side had some of the poorest housing conditions in the U.S., but the Chicago Housing Authority (CHA) began replacing the old high-rise public housing with mixed-income, lower-density developments, part of the city's Plan for Transformation. Many of the CHA's massive public housing projects, which lined several miles of South State Street, have been demolished. Among the largest were the Robert Taylor Homes.

== Demographics ==
In 2023, the community areas that make up the south side had a population of 1,042,363 people. 138,028 or 13.24 percent were White, 322,649 or 30.95 percent were Hispanic or Latino (of Any Race), 503,241 or 48.28 percent were Black, 53,027 or 5.08 percent were Asian, and 25,416 or 2.44 percent identified as other.

Some census tracts (4904 in Roseland, 7106 in Auburn Gresham) are 99% black.

Hyde Park is home to the University of Chicago, as well as the South Side's largest Jewish population, centered on Chicago's oldest synagogue, the Chicago Landmark KAM Isaiah Israel. The Southwest Side's ethnic makeup also includes the largest concentration of Gorals (Carpathian highlanders) outside of Europe; it is the location of the Polish Highlanders Alliance of North America. A large Mexican-American population resides in Little Village (South Lawndale) and areas south of 99th Street.

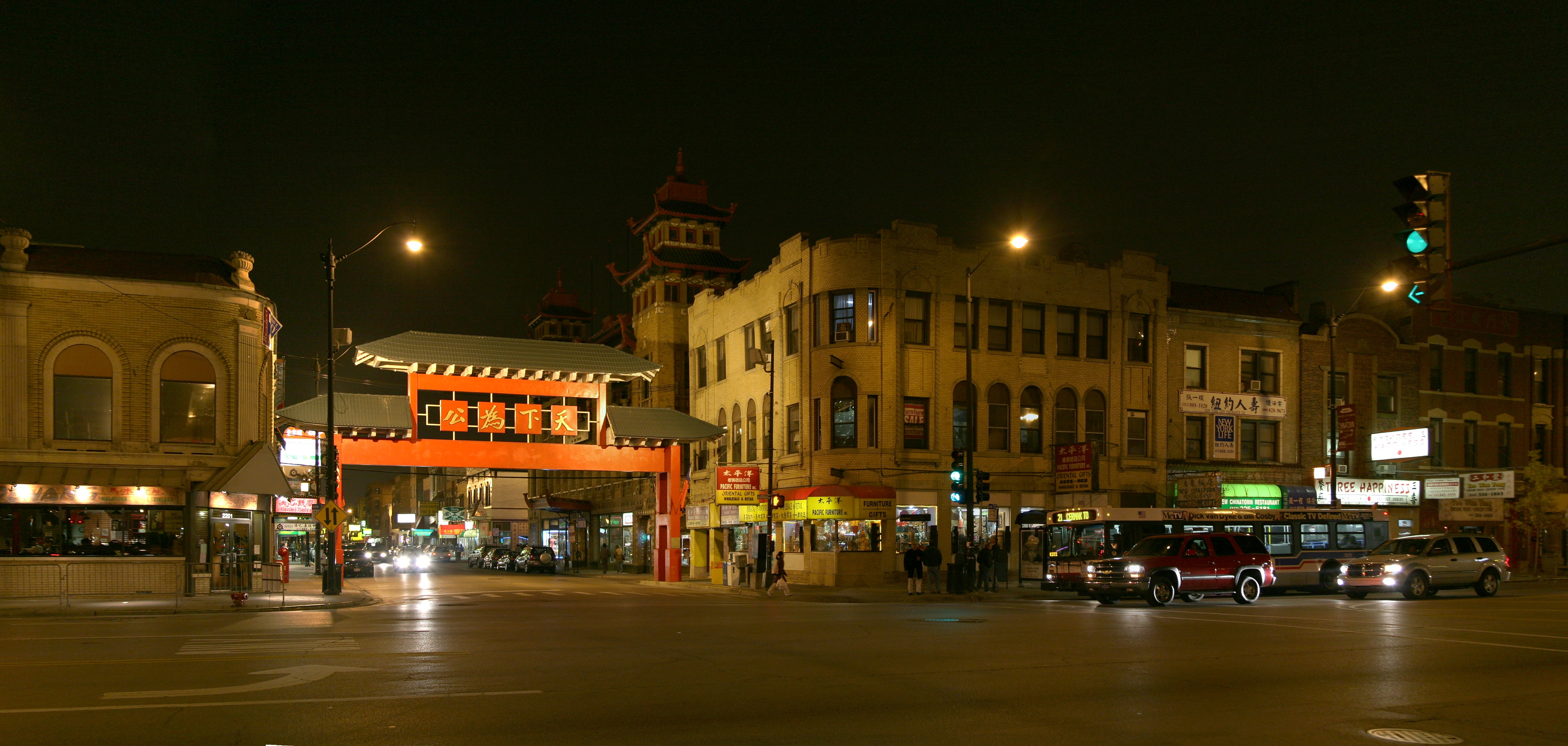
Chinatown

=== Ethnic parades ===
The South Side Irish Parade occurs in the Beverly neighborhood along Western Avenue each year on the Sunday before St. Patrick's Day. The parade, which was founded in 1979, was at one time said to be the largest Irish neighborhood St. Patrick's celebration in the world outside of Dublin, Ireland, and was—until being scaled back in 2012—actually larger than Chicago's other St. Patrick's Day parade in the Loop. The South Side parade became such an event that it was broadcast on Chicago's CBS affiliate.

Following the 2009 parade, organizers stated the group was "not planning to stage a parade in its present form". The parade was cancelled in 2010 and 2011 before being revived with more strict security and law enforcement. The Bud Billiken Parade and Picnic, the second largest parade in the U.S. and the nation's largest black parade, runs annually on Martin Luther King Drive between 31st and 51st Streets in the Bronzeville neighborhood, through the main portion of the South Side.

== Economic development ==
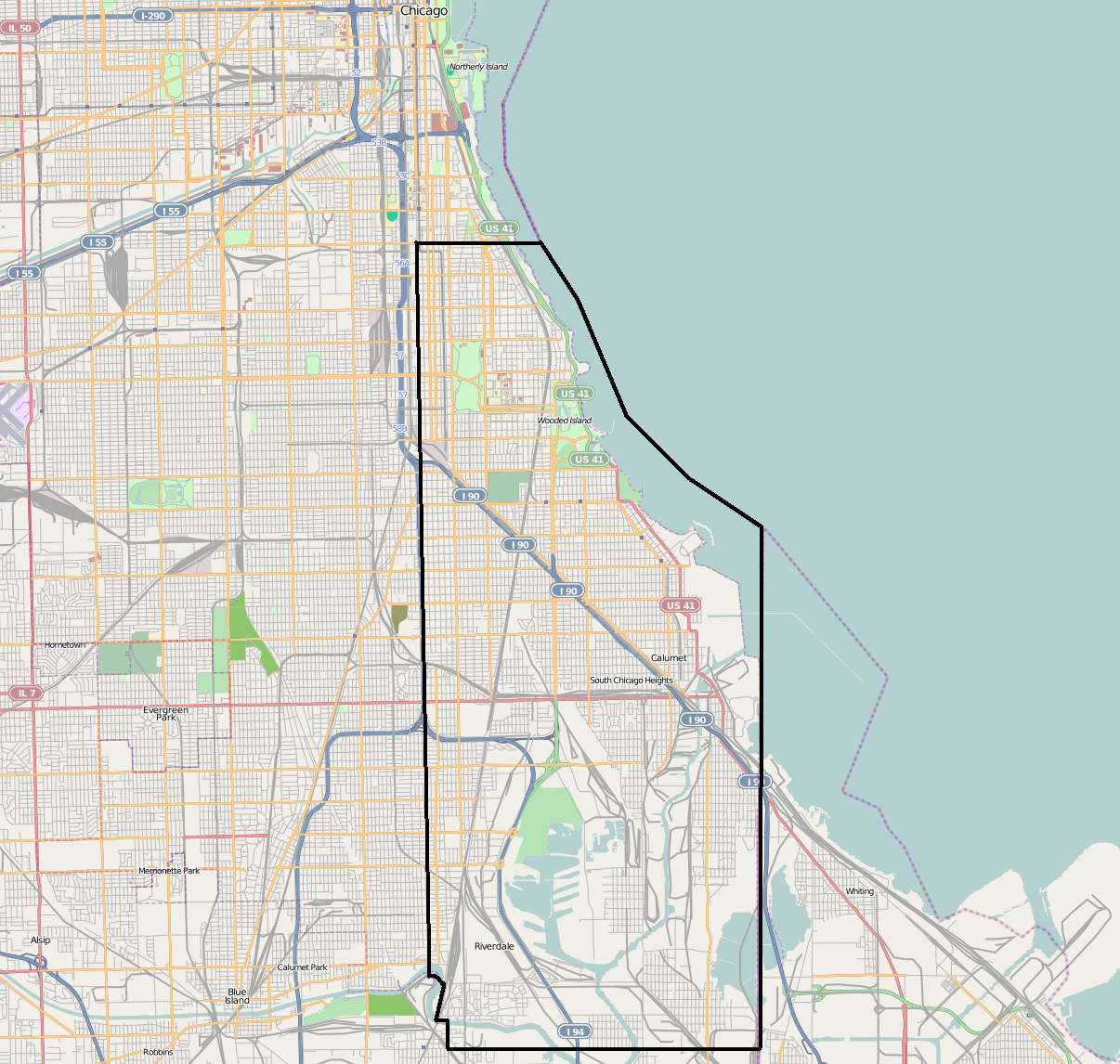
The former Hyde Park Township

Neighborhood rehabilitation, and in some cases, gentrification, can be seen in parts of Washington Park, Woodlawn (#42) and Bronzeville, as well as in Bridgeport and McKinley Park. Historic Pullman's redevelopment is another example of a work in progress. Chinatown is located on the South Side and has seen a surge in growth. It has become an increasingly popular destination for both tourists and locals alike and is a cornerstone of the city's Chinese community. The South Side offers many outdoor amenities, such as miles of public lakefront parks and beaches, as it borders Lake Michigan on its eastern side.

Today's South Side is mostly a combination of the former Hyde Park and Lake Townships. Within these townships many had made speculative bets on future prosperity. Much of the South Side evolved from these speculative investments. Stephen A. Douglas, Paul Cornell, George Pullman and various business entities developed South Chicago real estate. The Pullman District, a former company town, Hyde Park Township, various platted communities and subdivisions were the results of such efforts.

The Union Stock Yards, which were once located in the New City community area (#61), at one point employed 25,000 people and produced 82 percent of US domestic meat production. They were so synonymous with the city that for over a century they were part of the lyrics of Frank Sinatra's "My Kind of Town", in the phrase: "The Union Stock Yard, Chicago is ..." The Union Stock Yard Gate marking the old entrance to stockyards was designated a Chicago Landmark on February 24, 1972, and a National Historic Landmark on May 29, 1981.

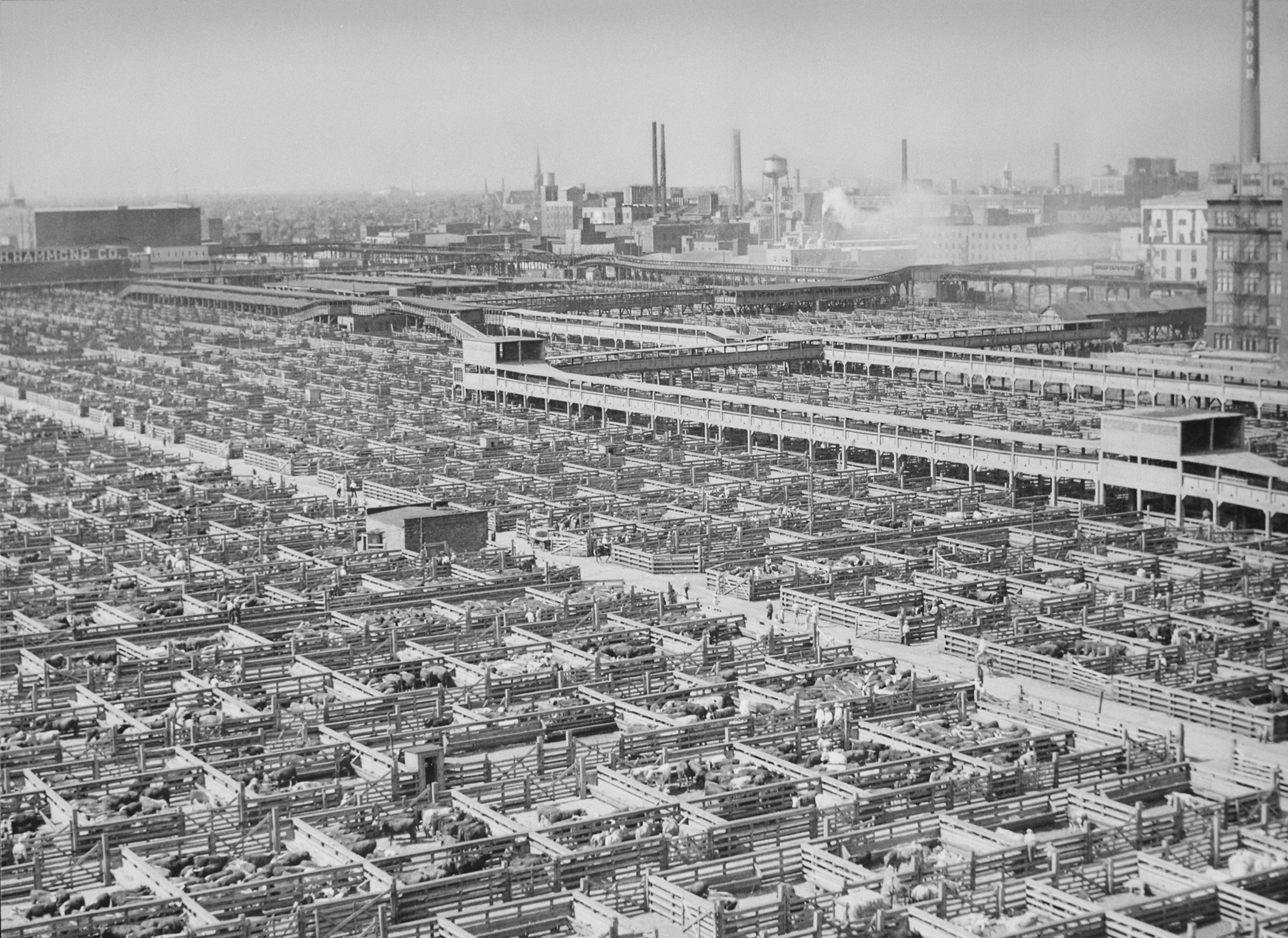
Union Stock Yards, 1941

Other South Side regions have been known for great wealth, such as Prairie Avenue. 21st century redevelopment includes One Museum Park and One Museum Park West.

The South Side accommodates much of the city's conference business with various convention centers. The current McCormick Place Convention Center is the largest convention center in the U.S. and the third largest in the world. Previously, the South Side hosted conventions at the Chicago Coliseum and the International Amphitheatre. The Ford City Mall and the surrounding shopping district includes several big-box retailers.

== Political figures ==
The South Side has been home to some of the most significant figures in the history of American politics. These include Richard J. Daley and his son, Richard M. Daley; the first black president of the United States, Barack Obama and former first lady Michelle Obama; the first black female U.S. Senator, Carol Moseley Braun; and the first black presidential candidate to win a primary, Jesse Jackson. Before them, Harold Washington, a Congressman and the first black Mayor of Chicago, as well as groundbreaking Congressman William L. Dawson, achieved political success from the South Side.

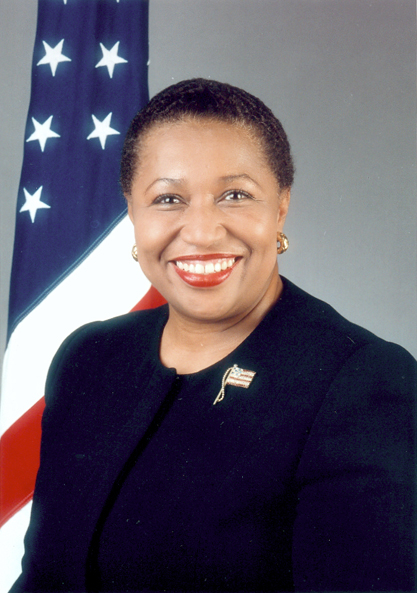
Carol Moseley Braun, the first Black female U.S. Senator

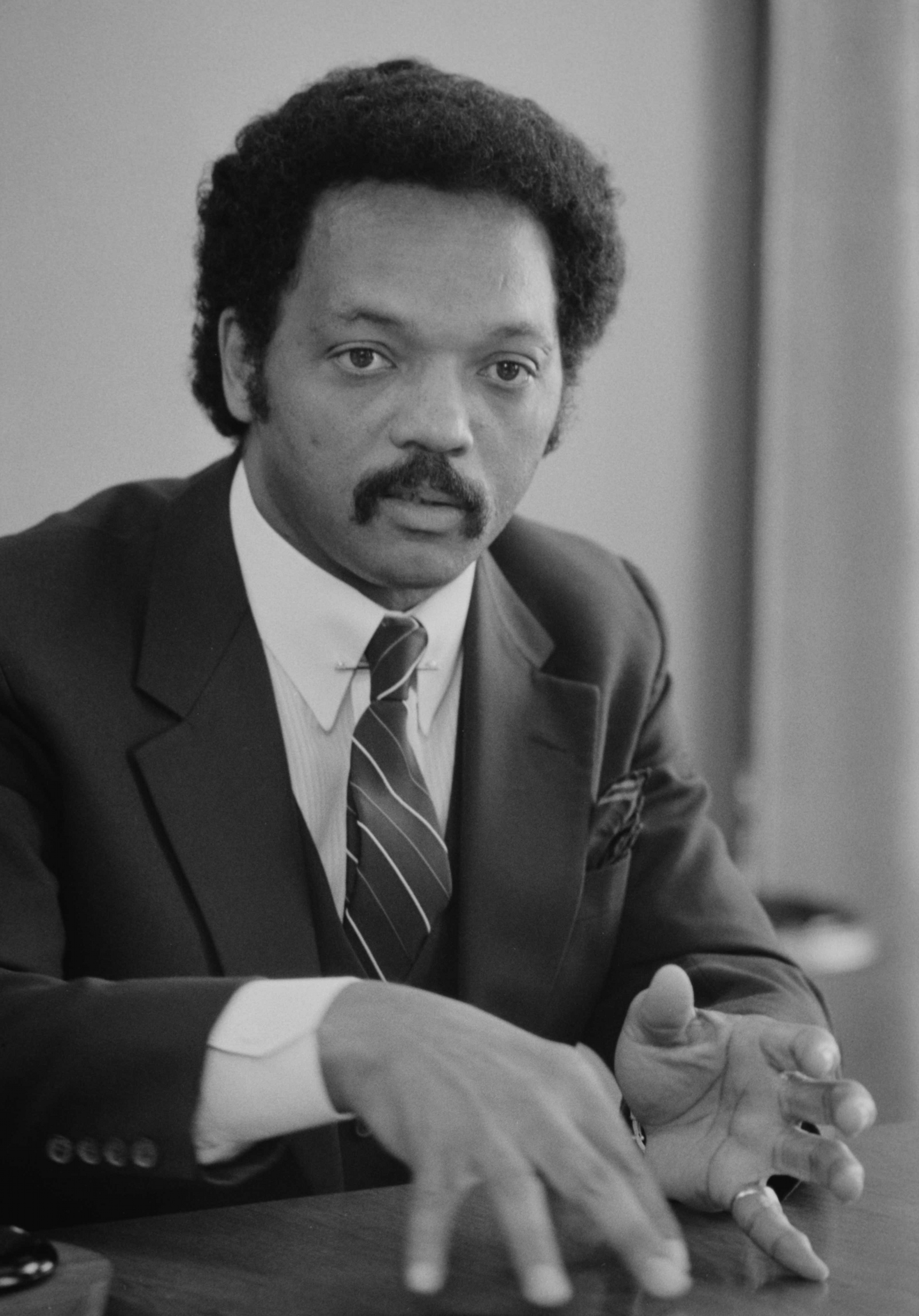
Jesse Jackson, the first Black presidential candidate to win a primary

== Education ==
=== Colleges and universities ===
The University of Chicago is one of the world's leading universities, counting 101 affiliated Nobel laureates. At Chicago Pile-1 at the university, the first self-sustaining nuclear chain reaction was achieved under the direction of Enrico Fermi in the 1940s.

Other four-year educational institutions there are the Illinois Institute of Technology, St. Xavier University, Chicago State University, Illinois College of Optometry and Shimer College. The South Side also hosts community colleges such as Olive-Harvey College, Kennedy-King College and Richard J. Daley College.

=== Primary and secondary schools ===
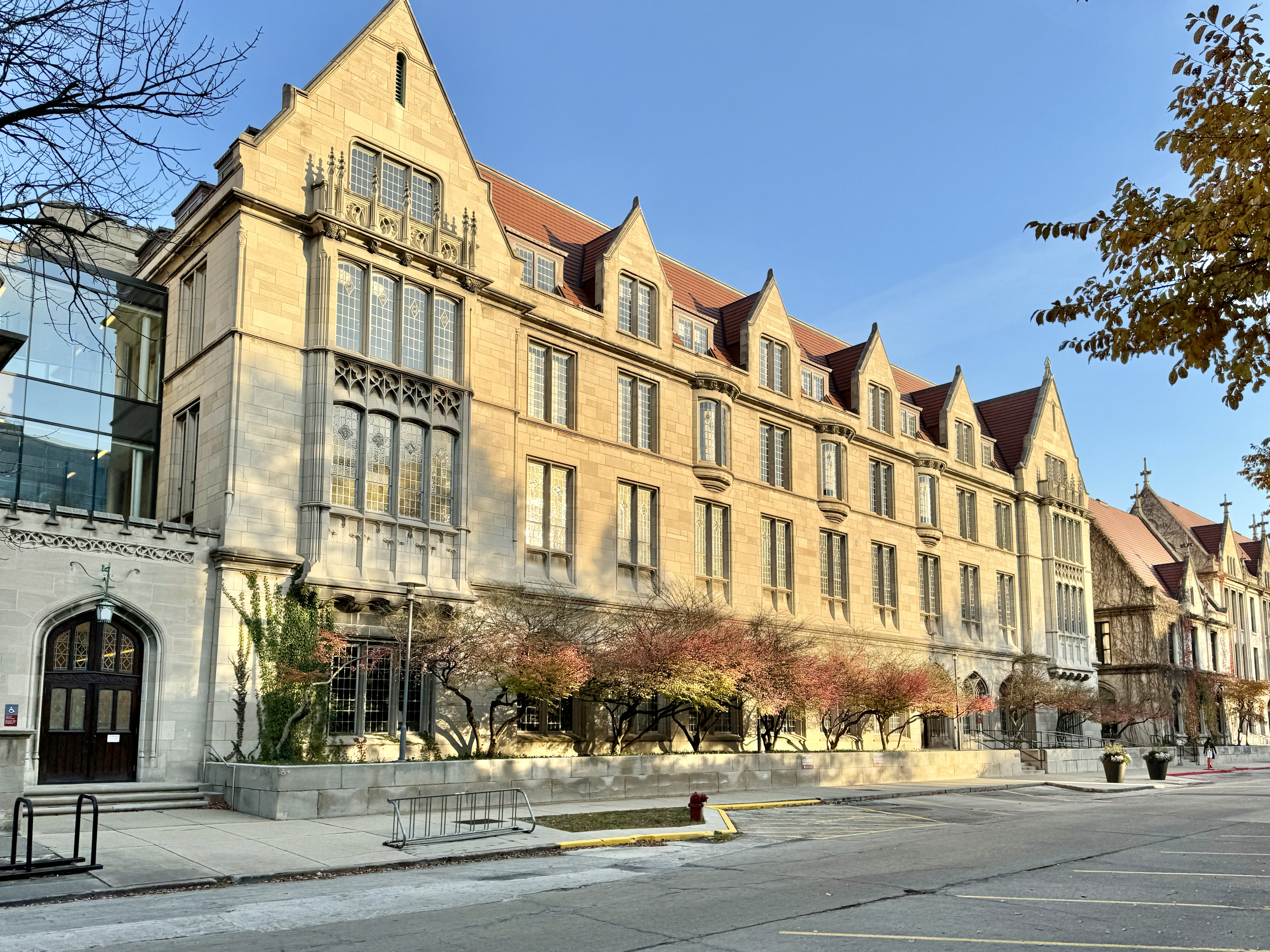
University of Chicago Laboratory Schools

De La Salle Institute taught five Chicago Mayors.

Chicago Public Schools operates the public schools on the South Side, including DuSable High School, Simeon Career Academy, John Hope College Prep High School and Phillips Academy High School. The De La Salle Institute, located in the Douglas community area across the street from Chicago Police Department headquarters, has taught five Chicago Mayors: Richard J. Daley, Michael A. Bilandic, Martin H. Kennelly, Frank J. Corr and Richard M. Daley. Three of these mayors hail from the South Side's Bridgeport community area, which also produced two other Chicago Mayors.

University of Chicago Lab School, affiliated with the University of Chicago, is a private school located there.

== Landmarks ==
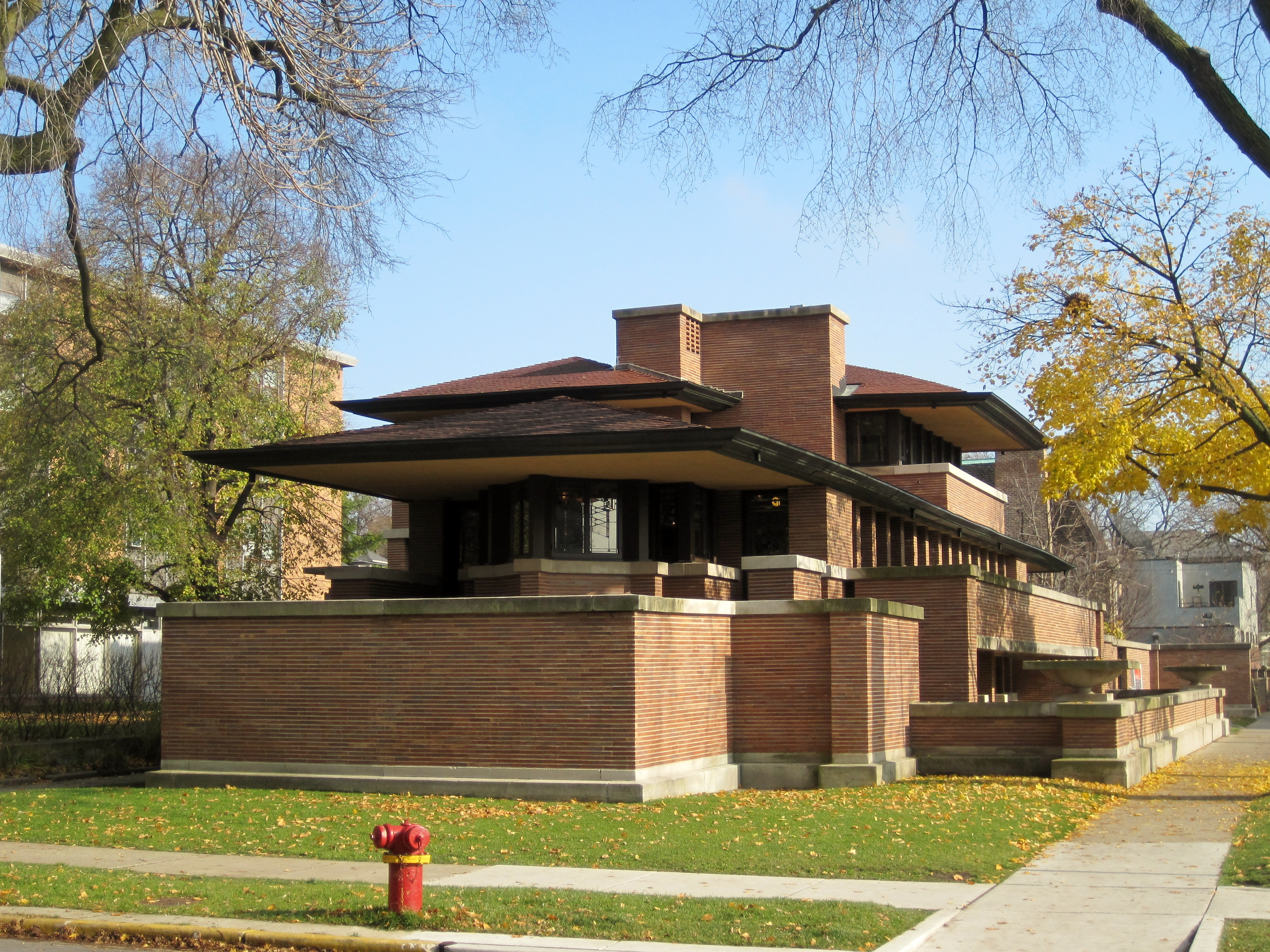
Frank Lloyd Wright's Robie House

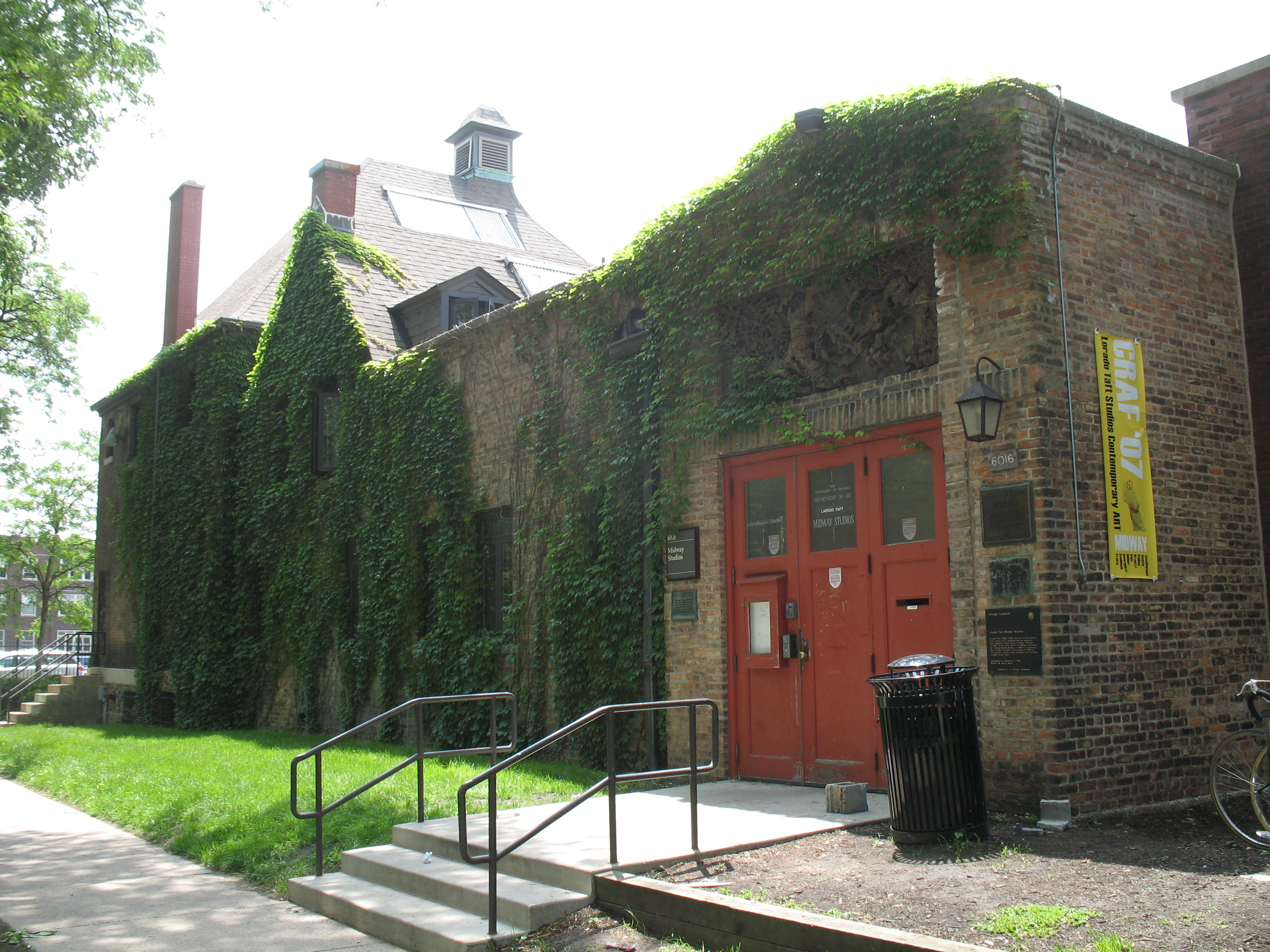
Lorado Taft's Midway Studios

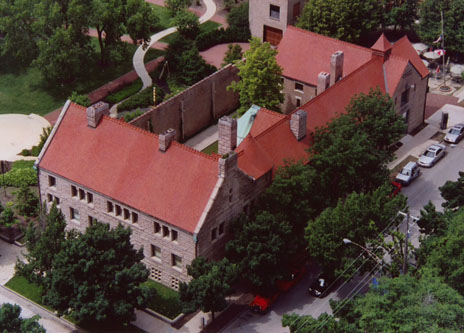
Aerial view of the John J. Glessner House

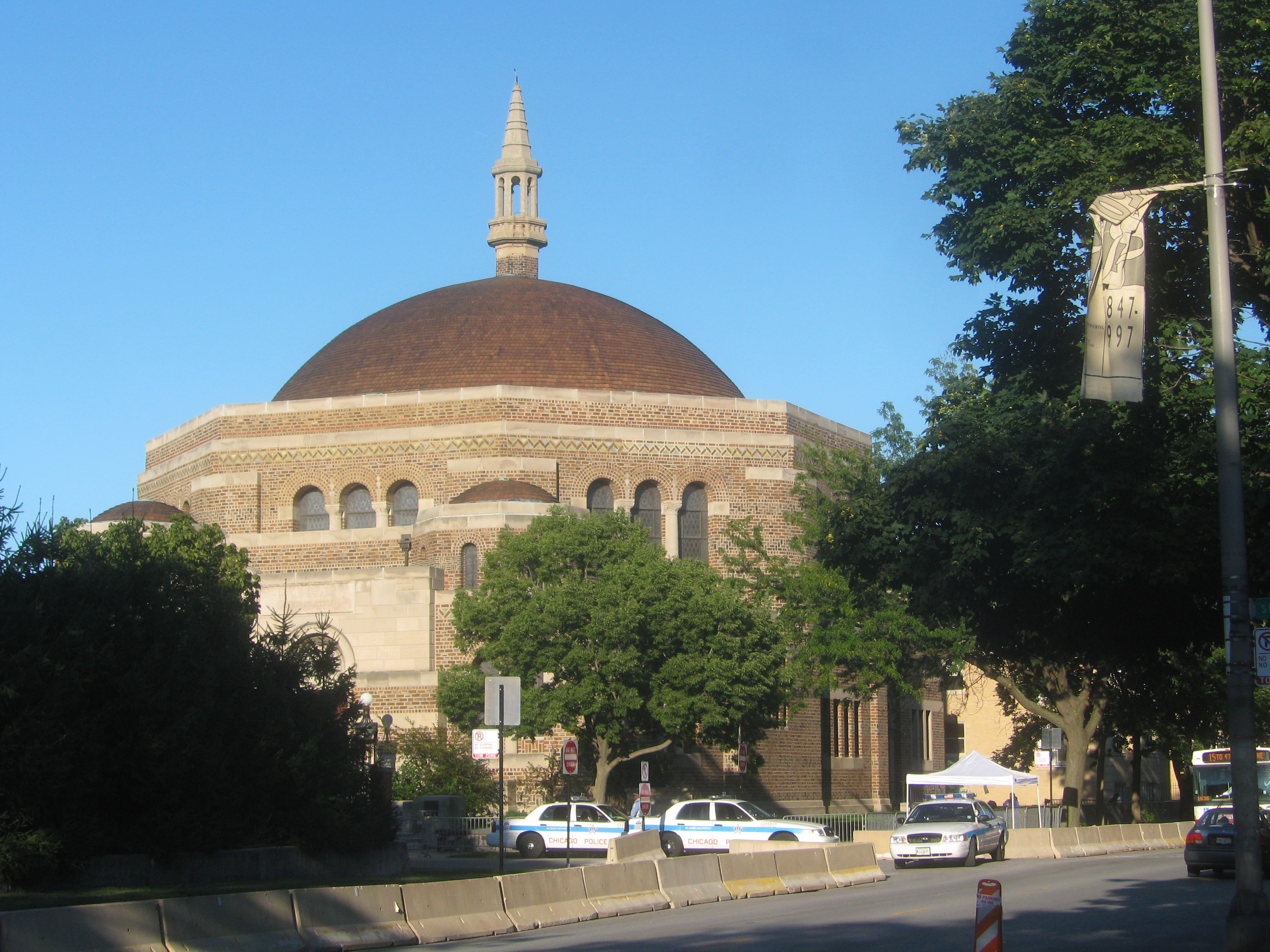
K.A.M. Isaiah Israel Temple

The South Side is home to many official landmarks and other notable buildings and structures. It hosts three of the four Chicago Registered Historic Places from the original October 15, 1966 National Register of Historic Places list (Chicago Pile-1, Robie House and Lorado Taft Midway Studios).

One Museum Park, which is along Roosevelt Road, is the tallest building on the South Side. One Museum Park West, which is next door to One Museum Park, is another of Chicago's tallest. 1700 East 56th Street in Hyde Park is the tallest building south of 13th Street. This neighborhood hosts several other highrises.

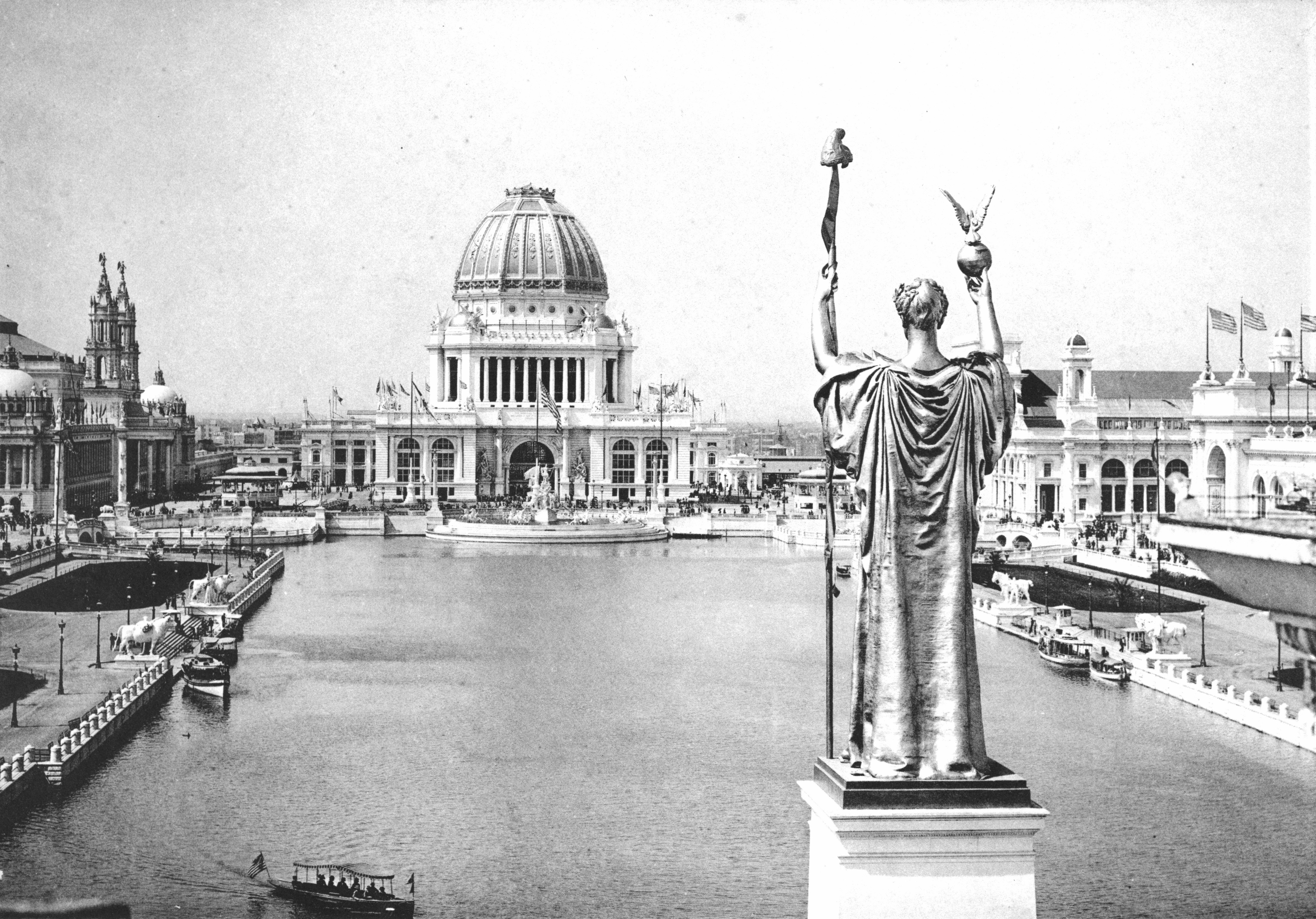
The South Side hosted the 1893 World's Columbian Exposition.

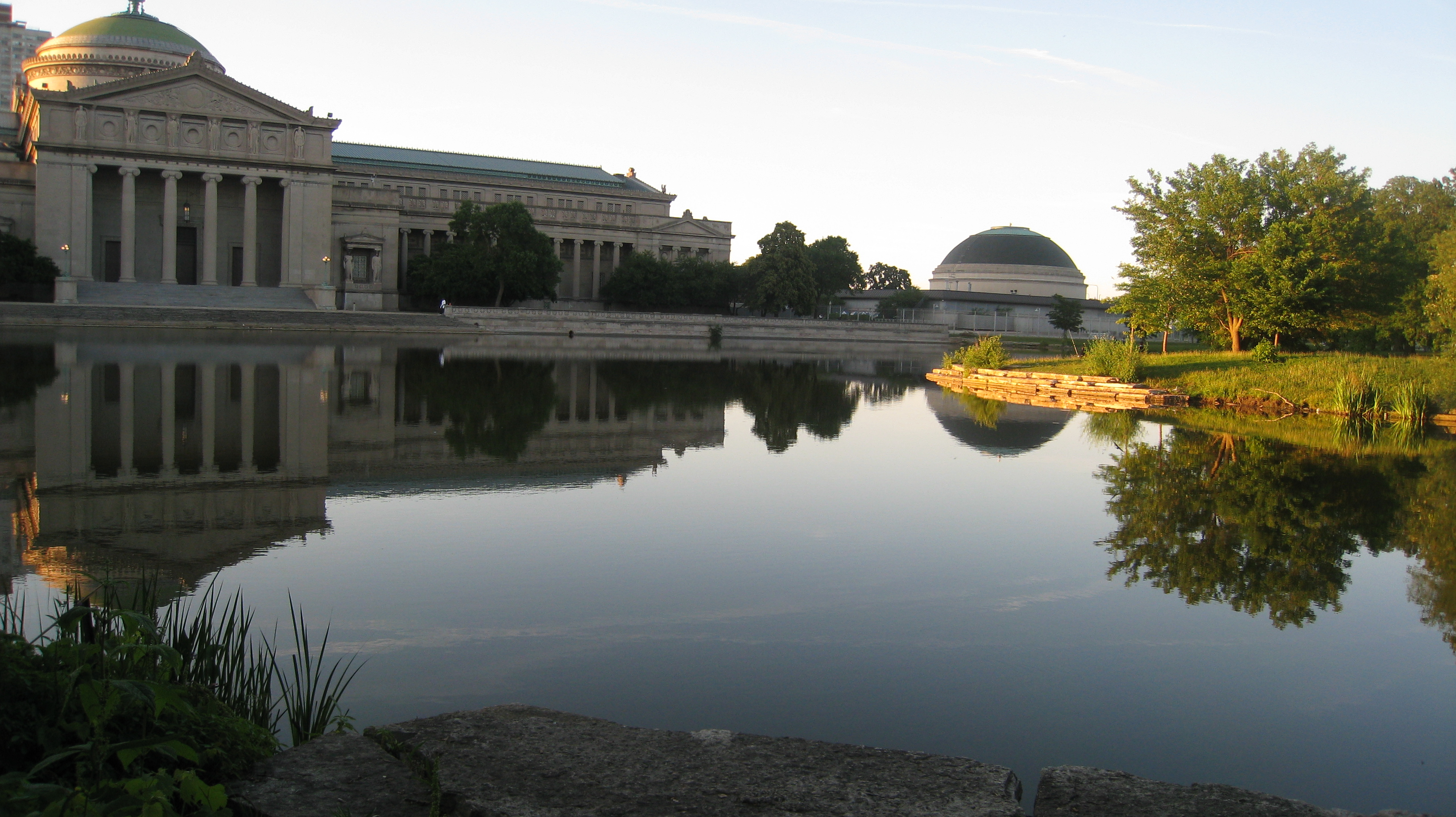
Museum of Science and Industry is one of the few remaining structures from the 1893 Exposition.

Many landmark buildings are found in the Black Metropolis-Bronzeville District, including Powhatan Apartments, Robie House and John J. Glessner House. The South Side has many of Chicago's premier places of worship such as Eighth Church of Christ, Scientist, First Church of Deliverance and K.A.M. Isaiah Israel Temple.

The South Side has several landmark districts including two in Barack Obama's Kenwood community area: Kenwood District, North Kenwood District and (partially) Hyde Park-Kenwood Historic District. The South Side hosts the Museum of Science and Industry, located in the Palace of Fine Arts, one of the few remaining buildings from the 1893 World's Columbian Exposition, which was hosted in South Side.

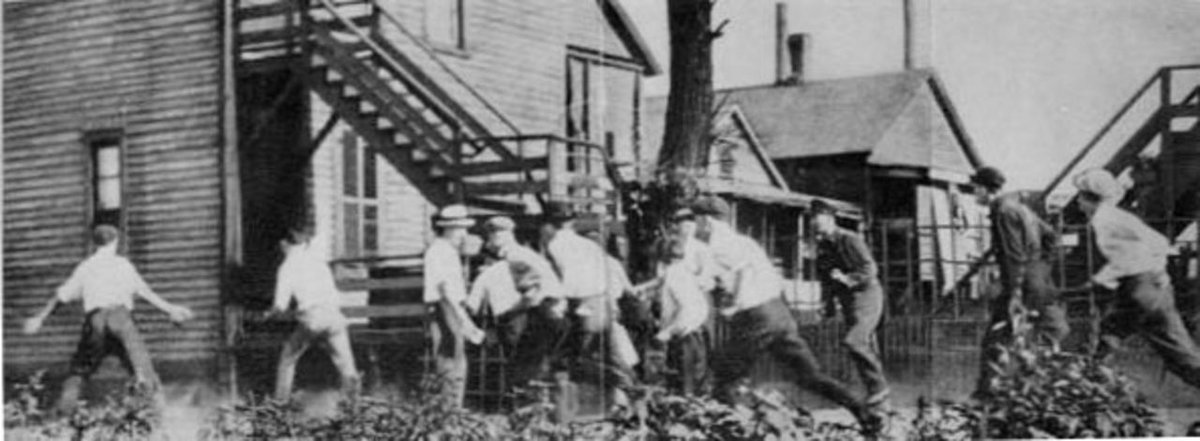
The Chicago Race Riot, 1919

The South Side is the residence of other prominent black leaders such as Jesse Jackson and Louis Farrakhan. It is also where U.S. Congressman Bobby Rush, a former Black Panther leader, serves.

The South Side has been a place of political controversy. Although the locations of some of these notable controversies have not become official landmarks, they remain important parts of Chicago history. The Chicago Race Riot of 1919 was the worst of the approximately 25 riots during the Red Summer of 1919 and required 6,000 National Guard troops. As mentioned above, segregation has been a political theme of controversy for some time on the South Side as exhibited by Hansberry v. Lee, 311 U.S. 32 (1940).

President Obama announced in 2015 that the Barack Obama Presidential Center would be built adjacent the University of Chicago campus. Both Washington Park and Jackson Park were considered and it was announced in July 2016 that it would be built in Jackson Park.

== Transportation ==
The Chicago 'L' serves Chicago and its suburbs.

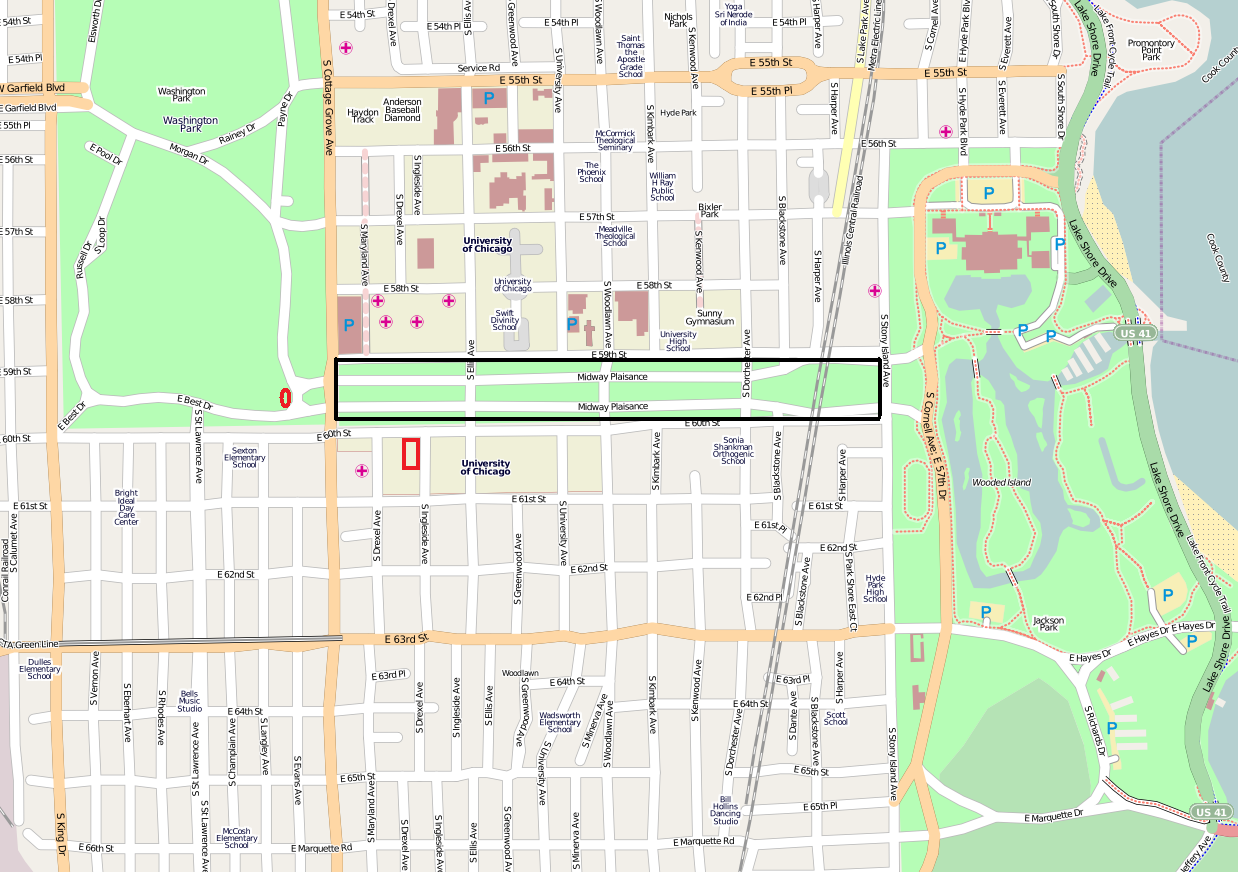
Midway Plaisance links Jackson (right) and Washington Parks (left). (University of Chicago in pink)

The South Side is served by mass transit as well as roads and highways. Midway International Airport is located on the South Side. Among the highways through the South Side are I-94 (which goes by the names Dan Ryan Expressway, Bishop Ford Freeway and Kingery Expressway on the South Side), I-90 (which goes by the names Dan Ryan Expressway and Chicago Skyway on the South Side), I-57, I-55, U.S. 12, U.S. 20 and U.S. 41.

Several Chicago Transit Authority (CTA) bus and train lines and Metra train lines link the South Side to rest of the city. The South Side is served by the Red, Green and Orange lines of the CTA, NICTD's South Shore Line, and the Rock Island District and Metra Electric District Metra lines and a few stops on the SouthWest Service Metra line. Standard local metropolitan bus service and CTA express service bus routes provide service to the Loop.

== Arts ==
Chicago's African American community, concentrated on the South Side, experienced an artistic movement from the 1930s until the 1960s. The movement was concentrated in and around the Hyde Park community area. Prominent writers and artists included Gwendolyn Brooks, Margaret Burroughs, Elizabeth Catlett, Eldzier Cortor, Richard Hunt, Gordon Parks, and Richard Wright.

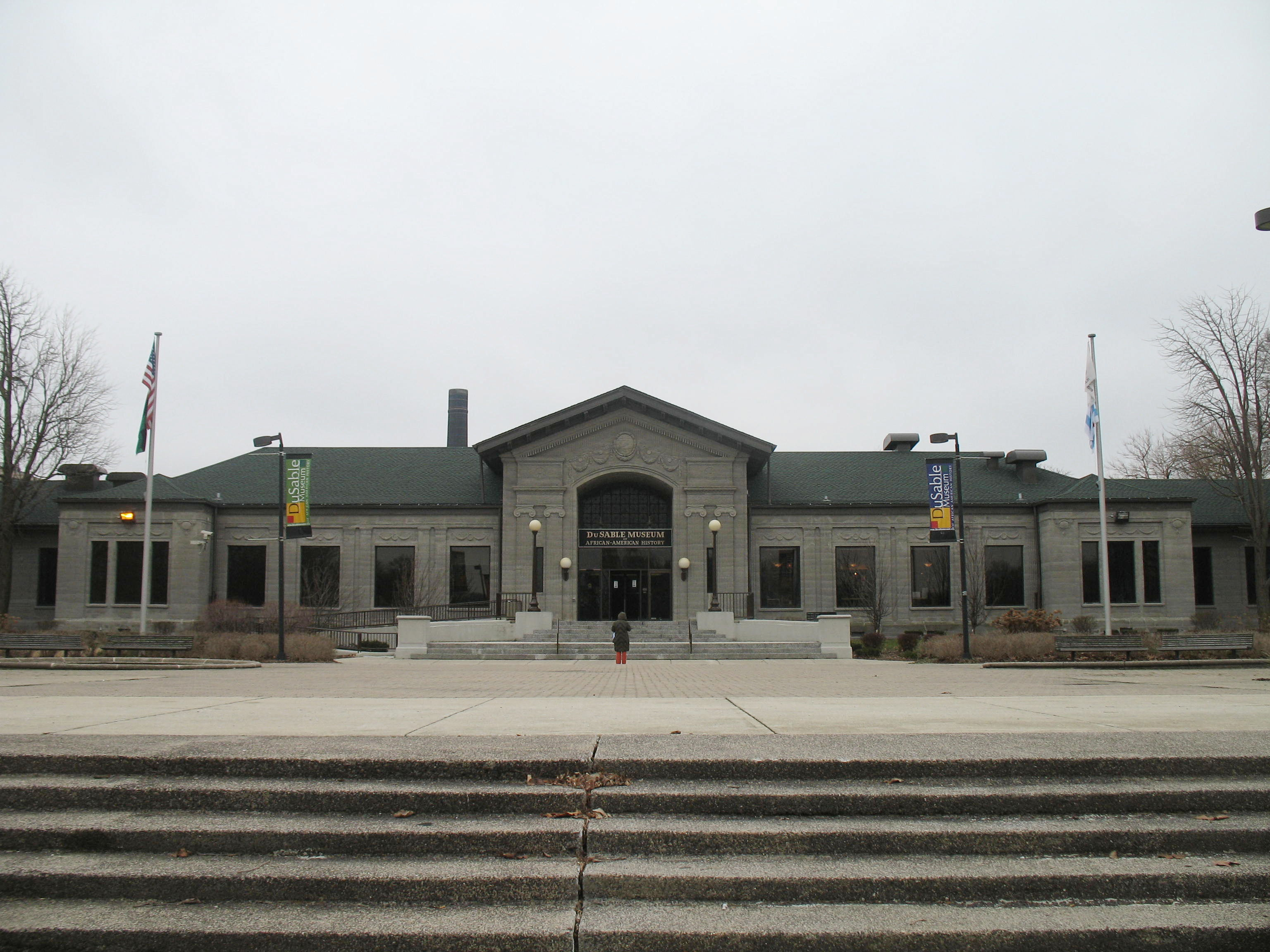
DuSable Museum located in Washington Park

Other Chicago Black Renaissance artists included Willard Motley, William Attaway, Frank Marshall Davis, and Margaret Walker. St. Clair Drake and Horace R. Cayton represented the new wave of intellectual expression in literature by depicting the culture of the urban ghetto rather than the culture of blacks in the South in the monograph Black Metropolis. In 1961, Burroughs founded the DuSable Museum of African American History. By the late 1960s the South Side had a robost art movement led by Jim Nutt, Gladys Nilsson, Karl Wirsum and others, who became known as the Chicago Imagists.

Music in Chicago flourished, with musicians bringing blues and gospel influences up from the South and creating a Chicago sound in blues and jazz that the city is still renowned for. The South Side was known for its R&B acts and the city as a while had successful rock acts. Many major and independent record companies had a presence in Chicago. In 1948, Blues was introduced by Aristocrat Records (later Chess Records). Muddy Waters and Chess Records quickly followed with Chuck Berry, Bo Diddley, Little Walter, Jimmy Rogers, and Howlin' Wolf.

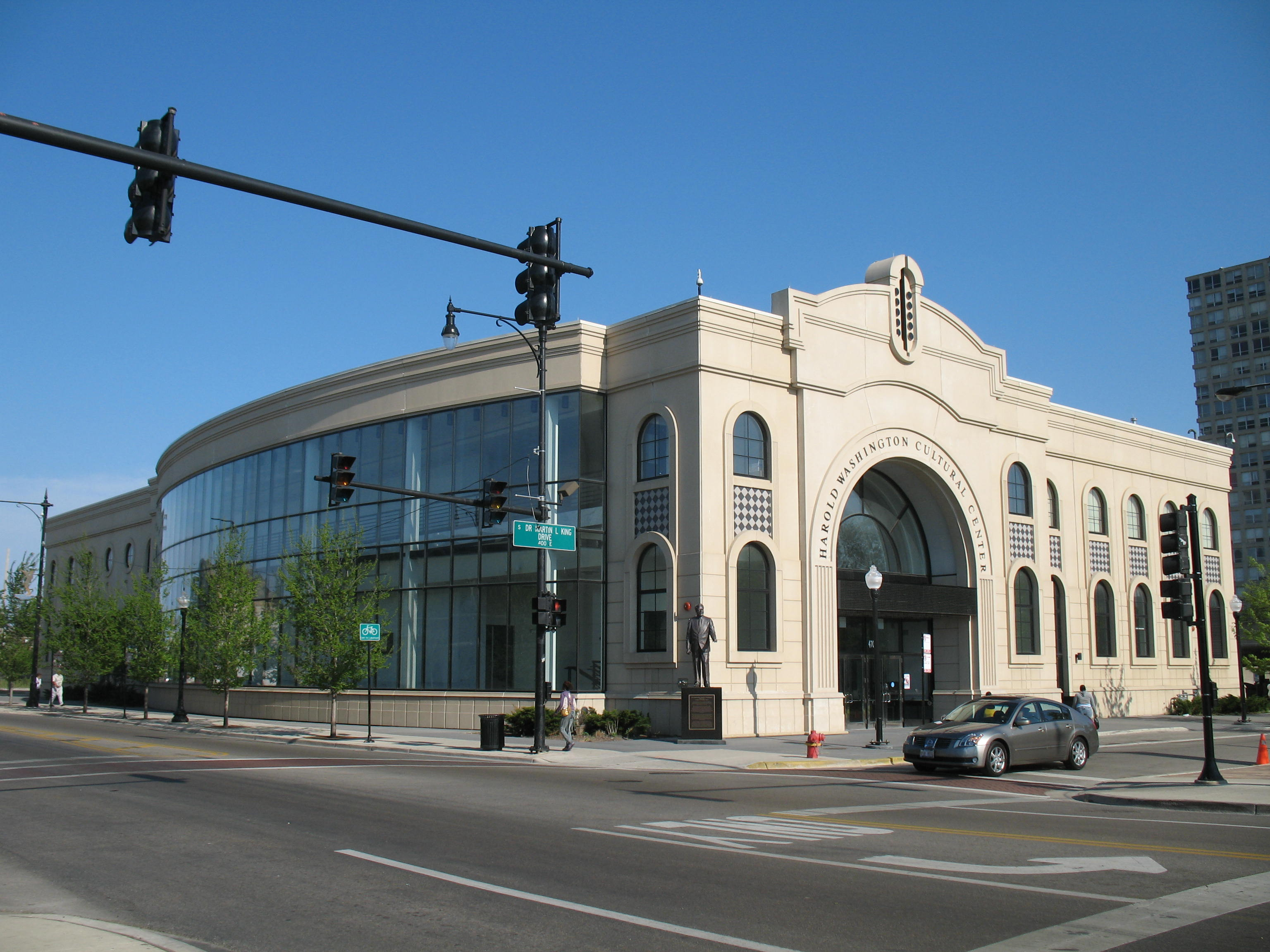
Harold Washington Cultural Center

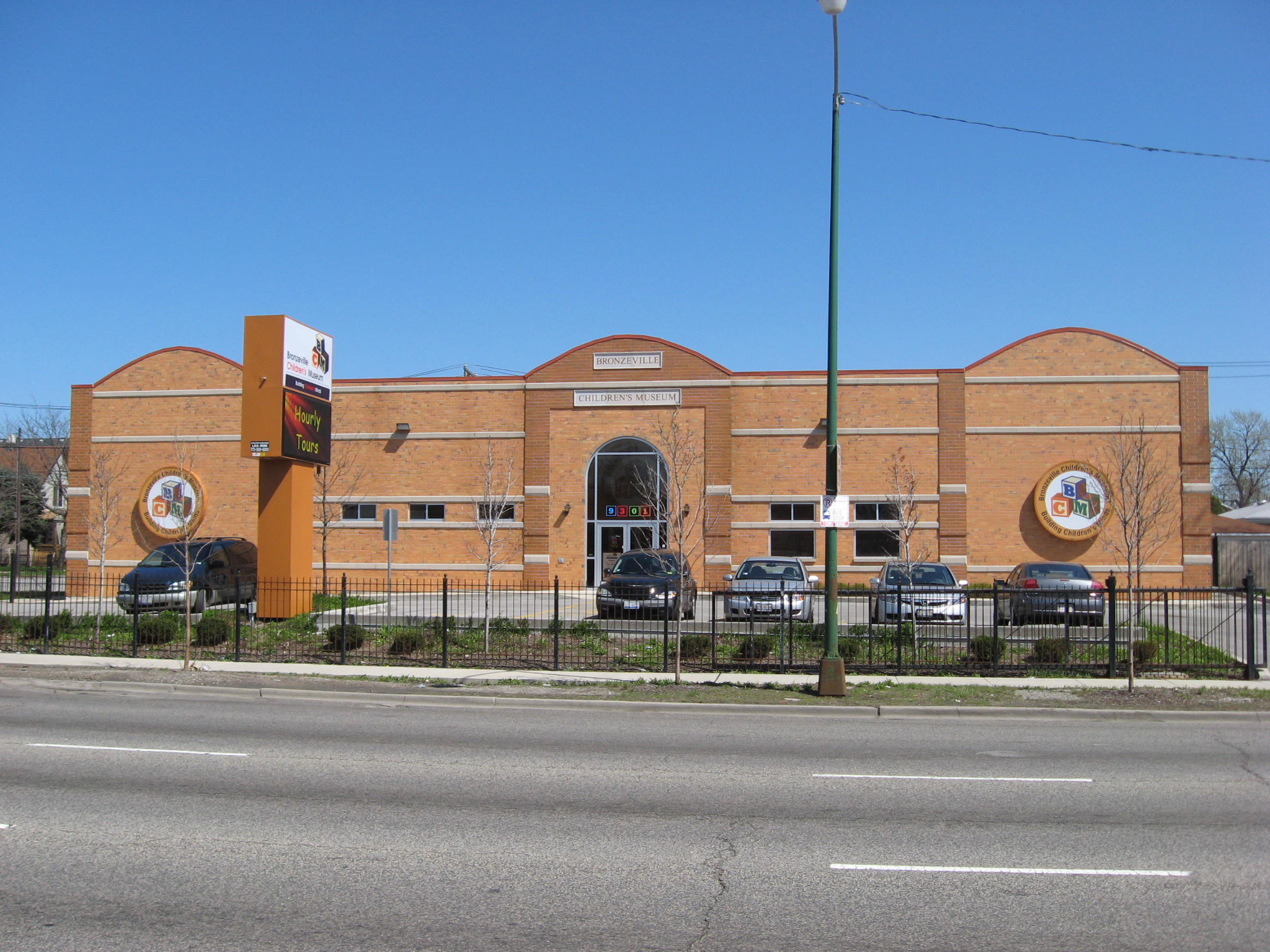
Bronzeville Children's Museum

Vee-Jay, the largest black-owned label before Motown Records, was among the post-World War II companies that formed "Record Row" on Cottage Grove between 47th and 50th Streets. In the 1960s, it was located along South Michigan Avenue. Rhythm and blues continued to thrive after Record Row became the hub of gospelized rhythm and blues, known as soul. Chicago continues as a prominent musical city.

Many other artists have left their mark on Chicago's South Side. These include writers Upton Sinclair and James Farrell, Archibald Motley Jr. via painting, Henry Moore and Lorado Taft via sculpture and Thomas Dorsey and Mahalia Jackson via gospel music. The South Side has many art museums and galleries such as the DuSable Museum of African American History, National Museum of Mexican Art, National Vietnam Veterans Art Museum, and the David and Alfred Smart Museum of Art (known as the Smart Museum). In addition, cultural centers such as the South Shore Cultural Center, South Side Community Art Center, Harold Washington Cultural Center and Hyde Park Art Center bring art and culture to the public while fostering opportunities for artists. The Bronzeville Children's Museum is the only African American Children's museum in the U.S.

== Parks ==
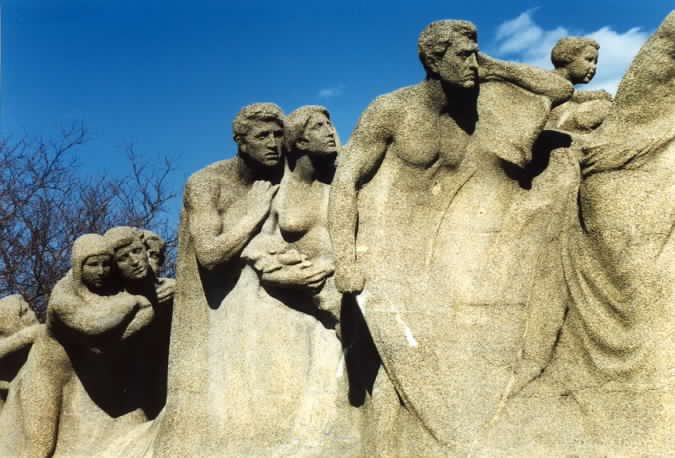
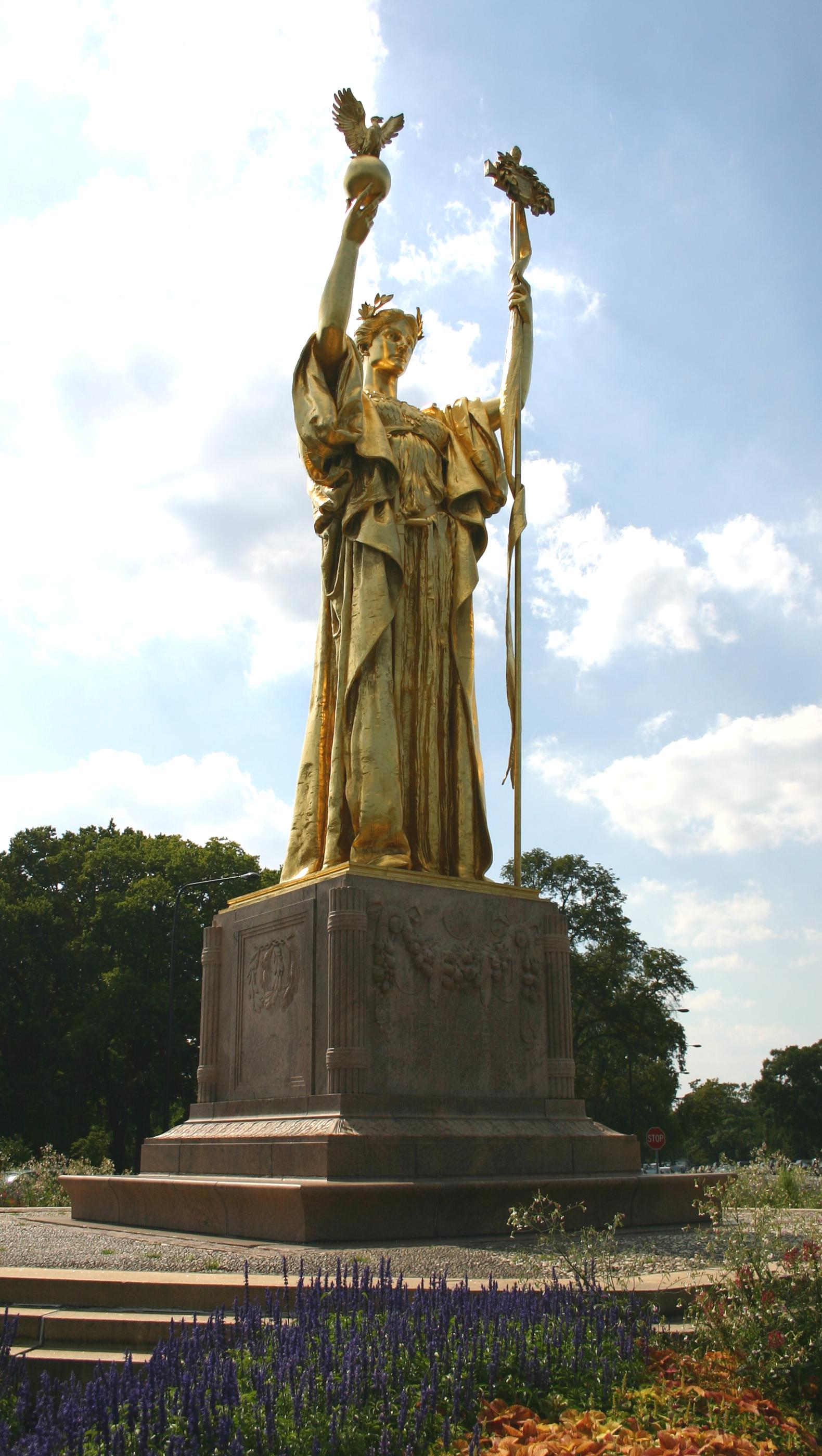
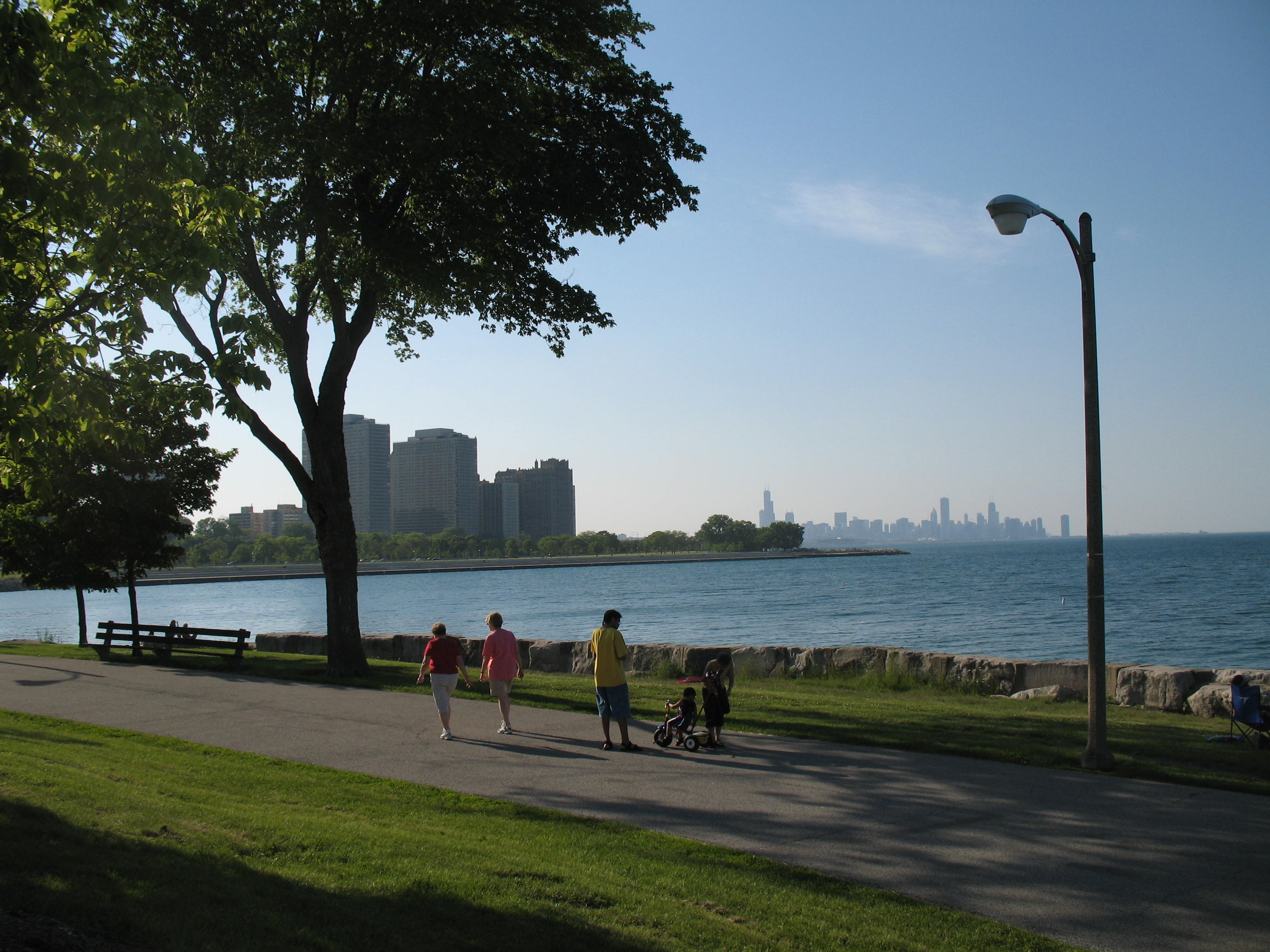
left: Washington Park's Fountain of Time; center: Jackson Park's Statue of the Republic; right: Burnham Park from Promontory Point

The Chicago Park District boasts 7,300 acres (30 km^{2}) of parkland, 552 parks, 33 beaches, nine museums, two world-class conservatories, 16 historic lagoons and ten bird/wildlife gardens. Many of these are on the South Side, including several large parks that are part of the legacy of Paul Cornell's service on the South Parks Commission. He was also the father of Hyde Park.

Chicago Park District parks serving the South Side include Burnham Park, Jackson Park, Washington Park, Midway Plaisance, and Harold Washington Park. Away from the Hyde Park area, large parks include the 69-acre (28 ha) McKinley Park, 323-acre (131 ha) Marquette Park, the 198-acre (80 ha) Calumet Park, and the 173-acre (70 ha) Douglass Park. The parks of Chicago foster and host tremendous amounts of athletic activities.

The South Side has the only Illinois state park within the city of Chicago: William W. Powers State Recreation Area. Other opportunities for more "natural" recreation are provided by the Cook County Forest Preserve's Dan Ryan Woods and the Beaubien Woods on the far south side, along the Little Calumet River.

Various events cause the closure of parts of Lake Shore Drive. Although the Chicago Marathon causes many roads to be closed in its route that goes as far north as Wrigleyville and to Bronzeville on the South Side, it does not cause closures to the drive. On the South Side, the Chicago Half Marathon necessitates closures and the entire drive is closed for Bike The Drive.

Beginning in 1905, the White City Amusement Park, located on 63rd Street provided a recreational area to the citizens of the area. Until the early 1920s, a dirigible service ran from the park, which was also where Goodyear Blimps were first produced, to Grant Park. This service was discontinued after the Wingfoot Air Express Crash. A fire destroyed much of the park in the late 1920s and more was torn down in the 1930s. The park filed for bankruptcy in 1933 and 1943. Despite attempts to resurrect the park in 1936 and 1939, by 1946 all the remaining equipment was auctioned off.

== Sports ==
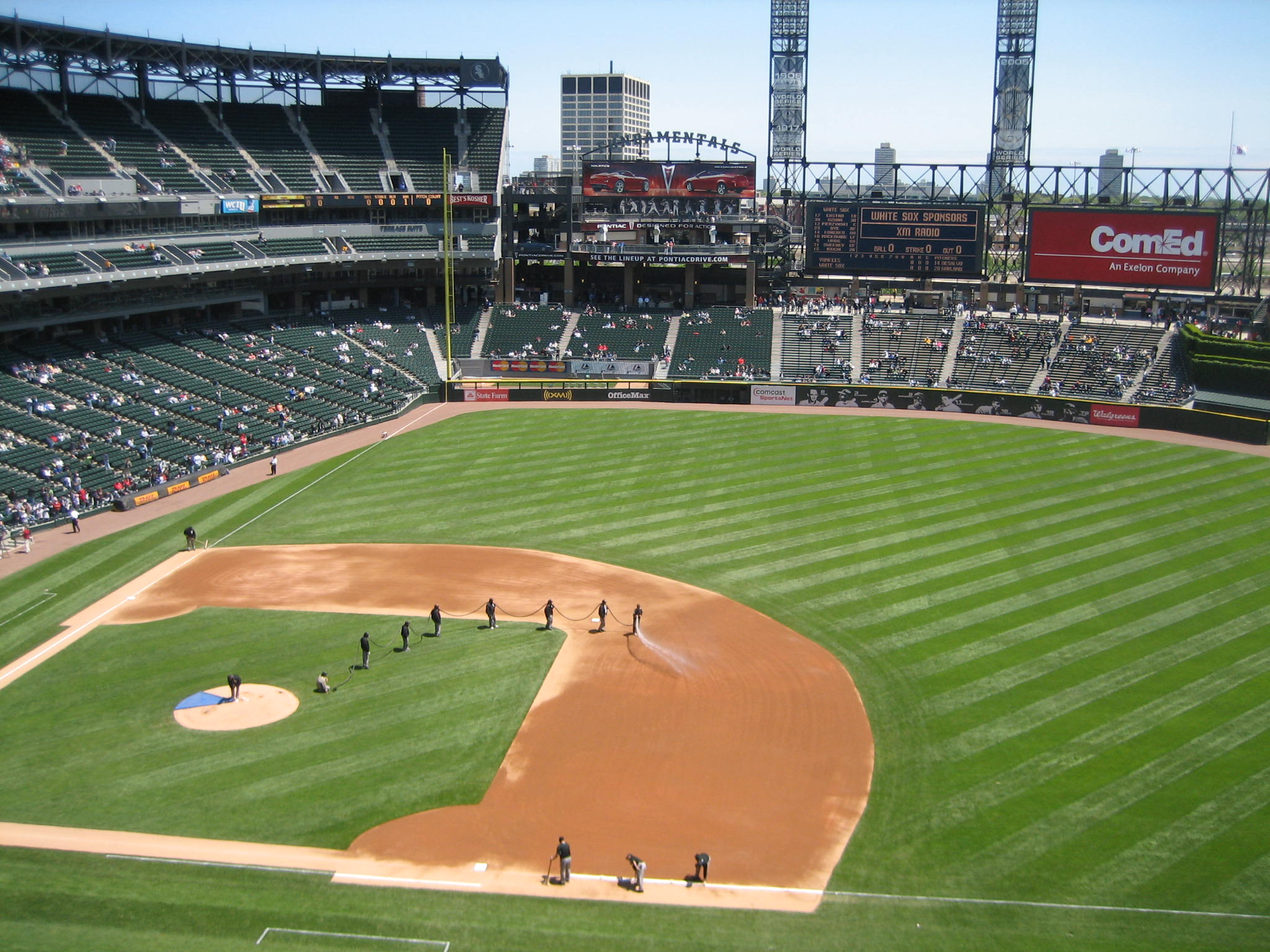
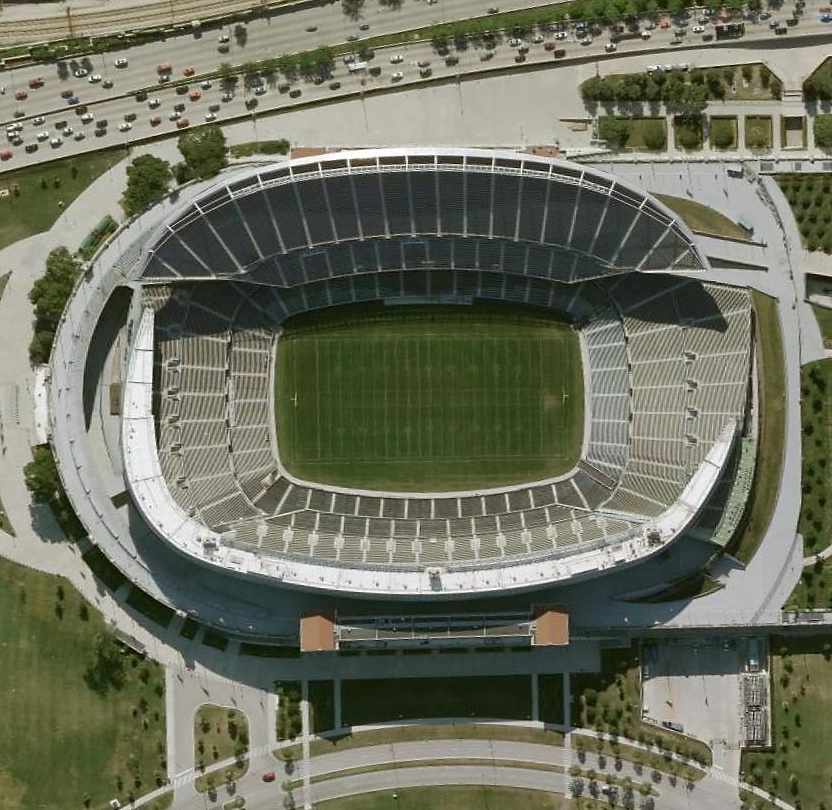
The South Side had a prominent role in the Chicago 2016 Olympic bid. Both Rate Field (left) and Soldier Field (right) are located on the South Side.

The South Side hosts three major professional athletic teams: Major League Baseball's Chicago White Sox play at Rate Field in the Armour Square neighborhood, while the National Football League's Chicago Bears and Chicago Fire FC of Major League Soccer play at Soldier Field, adjacent to the Museum Campus on the Near South Side.

Nine other teams—five now defunct, two playing in other media markets, and two now playing in another part of Chicago—have called the South Side home. When the National League baseball team now known as the Chicago Cubs was founded in 1870, their first playing field was Dexter Park in the Back of the Yards neighborhood. From 1874 to 1877 they played at 23rd Street Grounds in what is now Chinatown, and from 1891 to 1893 they played some of their games at South Side Park, which was located in the same place that Comiskey Park was built for the Chicago White Sox in 1910. South Side Park was also home to the Chicago Pirates of the short-lived Player's League in 1890. Another baseball field, also known as South Side Park, stood nearby in 1884 and was home to the Chicago Unions of the equally short-lived Union League.

The defunct Chicago American Giants baseball club of the Negro leagues played at Schorling's Park from 1911 to 1940, and then at Comiskey Park until 1952. In football, the Chicago Cardinals of the National Football League originally played at Normal Park but eventually moved to Comiskey Park in the late 1920s. The Cardinals left Chicago for St. Louis in 1960 and in 1988 for Phoenix, where they became the Arizona Cardinals. In hockey, the Chicago Cougars of the WHA played in the International Amphitheatre, located next to the Union Stock Yards, from 1972 until their demise in 1975.

Two NBA teams also briefly played on the South Side. The Chicago Packers played at the Amphitheatre in their inaugural season of 1961–62. The following season, they changed their name to the Zephyrs and played at the Chicago Coliseum on the Near South Side. The team moved to Baltimore after that season and now plays in Washington, D.C., as the Washington Wizards. Chicago's current NBA team, the Bulls, played at the Amphitheatre during their first season before moving away from the South Side to Chicago Stadium and eventually to United Center.

The Chicago Sky of the WNBA moved to Wintrust Arena, which opened in 2017 at McCormick Place on the Near South Side, in 2018. The venue is also home to both the men's and women's basketball teams of DePaul University, with the men exclusively using Wintrust Arena and the women splitting home games between that venue and DePaul's North Side campus.

The defunct Chicago Sting soccer club played at Soldier Field and Comiskey Park from 1974 to 1984.

In NCAA Division I sports, the Chicago State Cougars represent the South Side, competing in the Northeast Conference. As noted above, DePaul began playing its home men's basketball games on the South Side in 2017, though most of its other sports (including part of the women's basketball home schedule) remain on or near its main North Side campus.

=== 2016 Olympic bid ===
The South Side played a prominent role in Chicago's bid for the 2016 Summer Olympics. The Olympic Village was planned in the Douglas (#35) community area across Lake Shore Drive from Burnham Park. In addition, the Olympic Stadium was expected to be located in the Chicago Park District's Washington Park located in the Washington Park (#40) community area. Many Olympic events were planned for these community areas as well as other parts of the South Side.

== References in popular culture ==
The South Side's gritty reputation often makes its way into popular culture.

- The opening lines of Jim Croce's 1973 song "Bad, Bad Leroy Brown" state that the South Side is "the baddest part of town".
- Richard Wright's novel Native Son (ISBN 978-0-06-083756-3) takes place on the South Side and focuses on the plight of African Americans in the ghetto, including the housing practices that created such slums.
- Upton Sinclair's novel The Jungle (ISBN 978-1-884365-30-0) was a revelation about the Union Stock Yards at the turn of the 20th century.
- A Raisin in the Sun (ISBN 978-0-451-18388-0) is a story of Lorraine Hansberry's youth growing up in the Woodlawn community area.
- Barbershop and parts of The Blues Brothers take place on the South Side. David Auburn's play Proof takes place exclusively in the Hyde Park neighborhood; the 2005 film adaptation expands the setting.
- The Spook Who Sat by the Door is a novel and film dealing with the integration of the CIA. The majority of the story takes place on the South Side of Chicago where the sole graduating black cadet is from.
- The Boondocks, a comic strip and animated series, stars the Freeman family, who have recently moved from the South Side of Chicago to an affluent suburb.
- James T. Farrell's novels, collectively called the Studs Lonigan Trilogy, are set in an Irish neighborhood on the South Side.
- Iceberg Slim, the author of Pimp, was raised on the South Side of Chicago, which is the setting of most of his stories. He sold over six million books, which were translated, further disseminating his depiction of life of the South Side.
- Chicago's South Side is the setting for the Showtime series Shameless and the Chicago Fire, Chicago Med and Chicago PD TV series produced by Dick Wolf.
- The South Side is seen in Netflix's Sense8 series, in the scenes of Will.
- Kanye West was raised in Chicago's South Side and frequently mentions it in his music. His lyrical references are heard in the song "All Falls Down" where he can be heard saying "South Side, South Side, we gon' set this party off right". Other examples include "All Day" ("South, South, South Side"), "Feedback" (You borrow our motto, I'm a Chicago south sider) Famous ("For all my Southside n***as that know me best), and Wash Us in the Blood ("South Side let it bang, outside let it rain", and later in the song – "South Side what it does").
- In the 2004 film Mean Girls, which takes place in Evanston, Illinois, Mr. Duvall responds to a school-wide fight with, "Oh hell no, I did not leave the South Side for this!"
- The TV series South Side was co-created and written by Bashir Salahuddin, who was born and raised on the South Side.
- Chief Keef was raised on the South Side of Chicago, in the Parkway Garden Homes. He references the South Side in his music, such as the song "South Side". He references the South Side in the song "Almighty Gnar", with Lil Gnar.

== See also ==
- South Side Irish
- Union Stock Yards

== References and further reading ==
- Bachin, Robin F. Building the South Side: Urban space and civic culture in Chicago, 1890–1919 (University of Chicago Press, 2020).
- Carroll, Christopher R. "Catholicism (s) on Chicago's Southside: Race, Ethnicity, and Religion among Early-Generation Irish and Mexican Americans" (Diss. Northwestern University, 2018) online.
- Kennedy, Bridget Houlihan. Chicago's South Side Irish Parade (Arcadia Publishing, 2010) online.
- Moore, Natalie Y. The south side: A portrait of Chicago and American segregation (Macmillan, 2016) online.
- Pacyga, Dominic A. Polish immigrants and industrial Chicago: Workers on the south side, 1880–1922 (University of Chicago Press, 2003).
- Ralph, James (2006). "Chicago, Illinois". In Reich, Steven A. (ed.). Encyclopedia of the Great Black Migration. Vol. 1. Westport, CT: Greenwood Press. ISBN 0-313-32983-4.
- Rotella, Carlo. The World Is Always Coming to an End: Pulling Together and Apart in a Chicago Neighborhood (2020) excerpt
  - Borrelli, Christopher. "A writer comes home to ever-changing South Shore to find the middle class disappearing" Chicago Tribune May 9, 2019
  - Rodkin, Dennis. "Why does South Shore resist gentrification? Carlo Rotella is a Boston-based author of a new book that explores race, class and history in the lakefront Chicago neighborhood where he grew up." Crain's Chicago Business June 26, 2019
- Small, Mario Luis. "Is there such a thing as ‘The Ghetto’? The perils of assuming that the South Side of Chicago represents poor black neighborhoods." City 11.3 (2007): 413–421.
