= United States v. Stewart =

United States v. Stewart may refer to:

- United States v. Stewart (1940), interpreting a definition of the term "income" for the purpose of tax liability
- United States v. Stewart (2003), 348 F.3d 1132 (9th Cir. 2003), is a Ninth Circuit Court of Appeals case heard and decided in 2003 and then reconsidered by that same court in 2006 in light of an intervening Supreme Court decision

== See also ==
- Stewart v. United States (disambiguation)
