= Stewart v. United States =

Stewart v. United States may refer to:

- Stewart v. United States (1855), 56 U.S. 116 (1855).
- Stewart v. United States (1907), 206 U.S. 185 (1907).
- Stewart v. United States (1942), 316 U.S. 354 (1942).
- Stewart v. United States (1961), on a defendant's Fifth Amendment rights

== See also ==
- United States v. Stewart (disambiguation)
