= Milliken v. Meyer =

- Supreme Court of the United States

Argued December 13, 1940 Decided December 23, 1940
- Full case name: Milliken, et al. v. Meyer, Administratrix
- Citations: 311 U.S. 457 (more) 61 S. Ct. 339; 85 L. Ed. 278; 1940 U.S. LEXIS 2; 132 A.L.R. 1357

Court membership
- Chief Justice Charles E. Hughes Associate Justices James C. McReynolds · Harlan F. Stone; Owen Roberts · Hugo Black; Stanley F. Reed · Felix Frankfurter; William O. Douglas · Frank Murphy

Case opinion
- Majority: Douglas, joined by unanimous

Milliken v. Meyer, 311 U.S. 457 (1940), was a U.S. legal case in which both parties were residents of Wyoming. However, the defendant, Meyer, at the time of the suit was served personally in Colorado. In the subsequent trial he collaterally challenged the ruling in WY citing the court's previous holding in Pennoyer v Neff. The U.S. Supreme Court found that individuals can be sued in the state of their domicile for all claims.
