= United States v. Appalachian Electric Power Co. =

- Supreme Court of the United States

Decided December 16, 1940
- Full case name: United States v. Appalachian Electric Power Company
- Citations: 311 U.S. 377 (more)

Holding
- A waterway that could be made available for navigation in interstate commerce with reasonable improvements is a navigable water of the United States.

Court membership
- Chief Justice Charles E. Hughes Associate Justices James C. McReynolds · Harlan F. Stone; Owen Roberts · Hugo Black; Stanley F. Reed · Felix Frankfurter; William O. Douglas · Frank Murphy

Case opinions
- Majority: Reed
- Concurrence: McReynolds
- Dissent: Roberts
- Hughes took no part in the consideration or decision of the case.

United States v. Appalachian Electric Power Co., 311 U.S. 377 (1940), was a United States Supreme Court case in which the court held that a waterway that could be made available for navigation in interstate commerce with reasonable improvements is a navigable water of the United States. Whether or not Congress has actually contemplated or approved such improvements to the waterway is irrelevant.
