= Hansberry v. Lee =

- Supreme Court of the United States

Argued October 25, 1940 Decided November 12, 1940
- Full case name: Hansberry, et al. v. Lee, et al.
- Citations: 311 U.S. 32 (more) 61 S. Ct. 115; 85 L. Ed. 22

Holding
- The Due Process Clause of the Fourteenth Amendment prohibits a judgment in a class action from binding an individual whose interests were not adequately represented in the class action.

Court membership
- Chief Justice Charles E. Hughes Associate Justices James C. McReynolds · Harlan F. Stone; Owen Roberts · Hugo Black; Stanley F. Reed · Felix Frankfurter; William O. Douglas · Frank Murphy

Case opinions
- Majority: Stone, joined by Hughes, Black, Frankfurter, Douglas, Murphy
- Concurrence: McReynolds, Roberts, Reed

Hansberry v. Lee, 311 U.S. 32 (1940), is a famous and commonly used case in civil procedure classes in the United States for teaching that res judicata does not apply to an individual whose interests were not adequately represented in a prior class action. The case was successfully argued by the civil rights attorney Earl B. Dickerson.

The facts of the case dealt with a racially restrictive covenant, which barred African Americans from purchasing or leasing land in the Washington Park Subdivision of Chicago's Woodlawn neighborhood. A prior class action lawsuit, Burke v. Kleiman, named as class members all homeowners who had signed the covenant or whose preceding owners had signed the covenant, and the suit sought to enforce the covenant against an individual who was attempting to lease his home to an African American. The defendant in that class action argued that the covenant should not be enforced because of changed conditions. Rejecting that argument, the Illinois state court held that the covenant was enforceable.

Years later, a homeowner who had signed the restrictive covenant sold his home to Carl Augustus Hansberry, the father of Lorraine Hansberry. Anna M. Lee, a homeowner, sought to enforce the racially restrictive covenant and void the sale. The defendants, which included Carl Hansberry as well as the seller, argued that the restrictive covenant was not enforceable because owners of only 54% of the subdivision frontage had signed it, and the terms of the covenant established that it would go into effect only if owners of at least 95% of subdivision frontage had signed the covenant. Relying on the principle of res judicata, the Illinois courts refused to consider the new argument. Noting that the covenant had been judged valid in the prior class action and that the seller had been a member of the class, the Illinois courts held that the seller was bound by that judgment. Accordingly, he could not sell his home to Hansberry.

The United States Supreme Court reversed, holding that the state courts' application of res judicata violated the Due Process Clause of the Fourteenth Amendment. The court stated that members of the class in Burke v. Kleiman would have had conflicting interests: some signatories to the covenant would have wanted it to be enforced, and some signatories would not have wanted it to be enforced. The court explained:

Those who sought to secure [the covenant's] benefits by enforcing it could not be said to be in the same class with or represent those whose interest was in resisting performance, for the agreement, by its terms, imposes obligations and confers rights on the owner of each plot of land who signs it. If those who thus seek to secure the benefits of the agreement were rightly regarded by the state Supreme Court as constituting a class, it is evident that those signers or their successors who are interested in challenging the validity of the agreement and resisting its performance are not of the same class in the sense that their interests are identical...

— Hansberry, 311 U.S. at 44.

Without a sufficiently identical interest, the court held that the interests of the class members could not have been adequately represented and that binding them to a judgment in a case in which they were not adequately represented would violate their due process rights.

Later, racially restrictive covenants were held by Shelley v. Kraemer, 334 U.S. 1 (1948) to be unconstitutional under the Fourteenth Amendment, a case in which the private plaintiffs seeking to enforce such a covenant were invoking the power of the state courts.

== See also ==
- List of United States Supreme Court cases, volume 311
