= United States v. Stewart (1940) =

- Supreme Court of the United States

Argued October 17, 1940 Decided November 12, 1940
- Full case name: United States v. Stewart
- Citations: 311 U.S. 60 (more) 61 S. Ct. 102; 85 L. Ed. 40; 1940 U.S. LEXIS 1086; 40-2 U.S. Tax Cas. (CCH) ¶ 9759; 24 A.F.T.R. (P-H) 1042; 1940-2 C.B. 199

Court membership
- Chief Justice Charles E. Hughes Associate Justices James C. McReynolds · Harlan F. Stone; Owen Roberts · Hugo Black; Stanley F. Reed · Felix Frankfurter; William O. Douglas · Frank Murphy

Case opinions
- Majority: Douglas, joined by Hughes, McReynolds, Stone, Black, Reed, Frankfurter, Murphy
- Dissent: Roberts

United States v. Stewart, 311 U.S. 60 (1940), was a United States Supreme Court case expansively interpreting a definition of the term "income" for the purpose of tax liability.
