= List of United States Supreme Court cases, volume 311 =

Supreme Court of the United States
- Interactive map of Supreme Court of the United States
- 38°53′26″N 77°00′16″W
- Established: March 4, 1789; 236 years ago
- Location: Washington, D.C.
- Coordinates: 38°53′26″N 77°00′16″W
- Composition method: Presidential nomination with Senate confirmation
- Authorised by: Constitution of the United States, Art. III, § 1
- Judge term length: life tenure, subject to impeachment and removal
- Number of positions: 9 (by statute)
- Website: supremecourt.gov

This is a list of cases reported in volume 311 of United States Reports, decided by the Supreme Court of the United States in 1940 and 1941.

== Justices of the Supreme Court at the time of volume 311 U.S. ==
The Supreme Court is established by Article III, Section 1 of the Constitution of the United States, which says: "The judicial Power of the United States, shall be vested in one supreme Court . . .". The size of the Court is not specified; the Constitution leaves it to Congress to set the number of justices. Under the Judiciary Act of 1789 Congress originally fixed the number of justices at six (one chief justice and five associate justices). Since 1789 Congress has varied the size of the Court from six to seven, nine, ten, and back to nine justices (always including one chief justice).

When the cases in volume 311 were decided the Court comprised the following members:

Portrait	Justice	Office	Home State	Succeeded	Date confirmed by the Senate (Vote)	Tenure on Supreme Court
	Charles Evans Hughes	Chief Justice	New York	William Howard Taft	February 13, 1930 (52–26)	February 24, 1930 – June 30, 1941 (Retired)
	James Clark McReynolds	Associate Justice	Tennessee	Horace Harmon Lurton	August 29, 1914 (44–6)	October 12, 1914 – January 31, 1941 (Retired)
	Harlan F. Stone	Associate Justice	New York	Joseph McKenna	February 5, 1925 (71–6)	March 2, 1925 – July 2, 1941 (Continued as chief justice)
	Owen Roberts	Associate Justice	Pennsylvania	Edward Terry Sanford	May 20, 1930 (Acclamation)	June 2, 1930 – July 31, 1945 (Resigned)
	Hugo Black	Associate Justice	Alabama	Willis Van Devanter	August 17, 1937 (63–16)	August 19, 1937 – September 17, 1971 (Retired)
	Stanley Forman Reed	Associate Justice	Kentucky	George Sutherland	January 25, 1938 (Acclamation)	January 31, 1938 – February 25, 1957 (Retired)
	Felix Frankfurter	Associate Justice	Massachusetts	Benjamin Nathan Cardozo	January 17, 1939 (Acclamation)	January 30, 1939 – August 28, 1962 (Retired)
	William O. Douglas	Associate Justice	Connecticut	Louis Brandeis	April 4, 1939 (62–4)	April 17, 1939 – November 12, 1975 (Retired)
	Frank Murphy	Associate Justice	Michigan	Pierce Butler	January 16, 1940 (Acclamation)	February 5, 1940 – July 19, 1949 (Died)

== Federal court system ==
Under the Judiciary Act of 1789 the federal court structure at the time comprised District Courts, which had general trial jurisdiction; Circuit Courts, which had mixed trial and appellate (from the US District Courts) jurisdiction; and the United States Supreme Court, which had appellate jurisdiction over the federal District and Circuit courts—and for certain issues over state courts. The Supreme Court also had limited original jurisdiction (i.e., in which cases could be filed directly with the Supreme Court without first having been heard by a lower federal or state court). There were one or more federal District Courts and/or Circuit Courts in each state, territory, or other geographical region.

The Judiciary Act of 1891 created the United States Courts of Appeals and reassigned the jurisdiction of most routine appeals from the district and circuit courts to these appellate courts. The Act created nine new courts that were originally known as the "United States Circuit Courts of Appeals." The new courts had jurisdiction over most appeals of lower court decisions. The Supreme Court could review either legal issues that a court of appeals certified or decisions of court of appeals by writ of certiorari. On January 1, 1912, the effective date of the Judicial Code of 1911, the old Circuit Courts were abolished, with their remaining trial court jurisdiction transferred to the U.S. District Courts.

== List of cases in volume 311 U.S. ==
Case name	Citation	Date decided
Arkansas v. Tennessee	311 U.S. 1	1940
Continental Assurance Company v. Tennessee	311 U.S. 5	1940
Republic Steel Corporation v. National Labor Relations Board	311 U.S. 7	1940
Fleisher Engineering and Construction Company v. United States ex rel. Hallenbeck	311 U.S. 15	1940
W. India Oil Company v. Domenech	311 U.S. 20	1940
Hansberry v. Lee	311 U.S. 32	1940
Helvering v. Northwestern Steel Rolling Mills, Inc.	311 U.S. 46	1940
Crane-Johnson Company v. Helvering	311 U.S. 54	1940
J.E. Riley Investment Company v. Internal Revenue Service	311 U.S. 55	1940
United States v. Stewart	311 U.S. 60	1940
Machinists v. National Labor Relations Board	311 U.S. 72	1940
Neuberger v. Internal Revenue Service	311 U.S. 83	1940
Milk Wagon Drivers v. Lake Valley Farm Products, Inc.	311 U.S. 91	1940
Wilson and Company v. United States	311 U.S. 104	1940
Wisconsin v. Illinois	311 U.S. 107	1940
Helvering v. Horst	311 U.S. 112	1940
Helvering v. Eubank	311 U.S. 122	1940
Smith v. Texas	311 U.S. 128	1940
Federal Communications Commission v. Columbia Broadcasting System	311 U.S. 132	1940
American United Mutual Life Insurance Company v. Avon Park	311 U.S. 138	1940
Bacardi Corporation v. Domenech	311 U.S. 150	1940
Fidelity Union Trust Company v. Field	311 U.S. 169	1940
Six Cos. v. Joint Highway District	311 U.S. 180	1940
Helvering v. Janney	311 U.S. 189	1940
Taft v. Helvering	311 U.S. 195	1940
Kloeb v. Armour and Company	311 U.S. 199	1940
United States v. Falcone	311 U.S. 205	1940
Schriber-Schroth Company v. Cleveland Trust Company	311 U.S. 211	1940
West v. AT&T	311 U.S. 223	1940
Montgomery Ward and Company v. Duncan	311 U.S. 243	1940
C.E. Stevens Company v. Foster and Kleiser Company	311 U.S. 255	1940
Bowman v. Loperena	311 U.S. 262	1940
Helvering v. Oregon Mutual Life Insurance Company	311 U.S. 267	1940
Helvering v. Pan-American Life Insurance Company	311 U.S. 272	1940
Wright v. Union Central Life Insurance Company	311 U.S. 273	1940
Deckert v. Independent Shares Corporation	311 U.S. 282	1940
United States v. Harris	311 U.S. 292	1940
L. Singer and Sons v. Union Pacific Railroad Company	311 U.S. 295	1940
United States v. Northern Pacific Railroad Company	311 U.S. 317	1940
United States v. Appalachian Electric Power Company	311 U.S. 377	1940
Wisconsin v. J.C. Penney Company	311 U.S. 435	1940
Wisconsin v. Minnesota Mining and Manufacturing Company	311 U.S. 452	1940
Best and Company v. Maxwell	311 U.S. 454	1940
Milliken v. Meyer	311 U.S. 457	1940
Stoner v. New York Life Insurance Company	311 U.S. 464	1940
Z. and F. Assets Realization Corporation v. Hull	311 U.S. 470	1941
Jackson v. Irving Trust Company	311 U.S. 494	1941
Helvering v. Hammel	311 U.S. 504	1941
Electro-Chemical Engraving Company v. Commissioner	311 U.S. 513	1941
H.J. Heinz Company v. National Labor Relations Board	311 U.S. 514	1941
McClain v. Internal Revenue Service	311 U.S. 527	1941
Voeller v. Neilston Warehouse Company	311 U.S. 531	1941
Vandenbark v. Owens-Illinois Glass Company	311 U.S. 538	1941
Palmer v. Connecticut Railway and Lighting Company	311 U.S. 544	1941
Railroad Commissioner v. Rowan and Nichols Oil Company	311 U.S. 570	1941
Railroad Commissioner v. Humble Oil and Refining Company	311 U.S. 578	1941
Reconstruction Finance Corporation v. Prudence Sec. Advisory Group	311 U.S. 579	1941
National Labor Relations Board v. Link-Belt Company	311 U.S. 584	1941
