= Irve Tunick =

American scriptwriter (1912–1987)

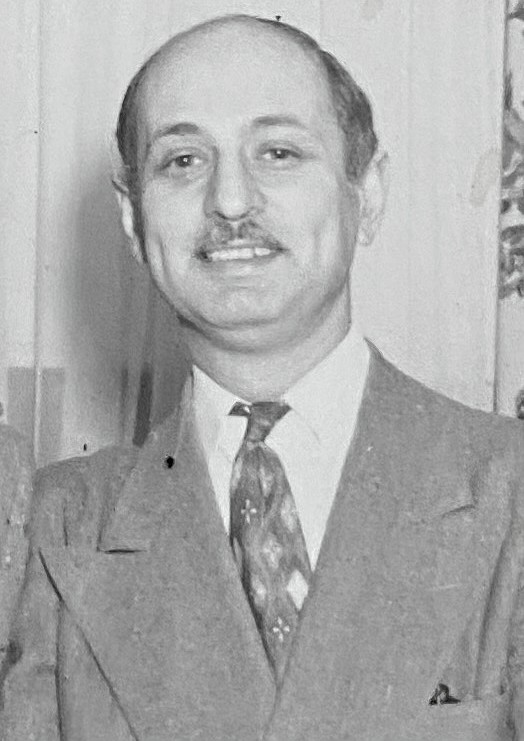
- Born: July 27, 1912; New York City, U.S.
- Died: September 10, 1987 (aged 75); Carmel, New York, U.S.
- Occupations: Screenwriter, producer
- Spouse: Adele Lehnstul (died 1981) Bea Greenberg
- Children: 3

Irve Tunick (July 27, 1912 – September 10, 1987) was an American scriptwriter and producer. He is best known for writing scripts for radio, television, and movies including for Freedom's People, Studio One, Armstrong Circle Theatre, The Bold Ones, Bonanza, Ironside, Witness, and The F.B.I.

Tunick began writing scripts in the 1930s for radio and continued writing scripts into the 1970s with his last script being for television. After 14 years of being employed as a scriptwriter, Tunick had written over 1000 radio and TV scripts.

Tunick founded and was president of the Eastern Region of the Television Writers of America, which was a predecessor of the Writers Guild of America.

Most notably, Tunick co-wrote the script for Murder Inc., released in 1960, which earned an Academy Award for Best Actor nomination for Peter Falk.

== Early life ==
Irve Tunick was born on July 27, 1912, in New York City. He attended Georgetown University in Washington D.C., and later New York University in New York City.

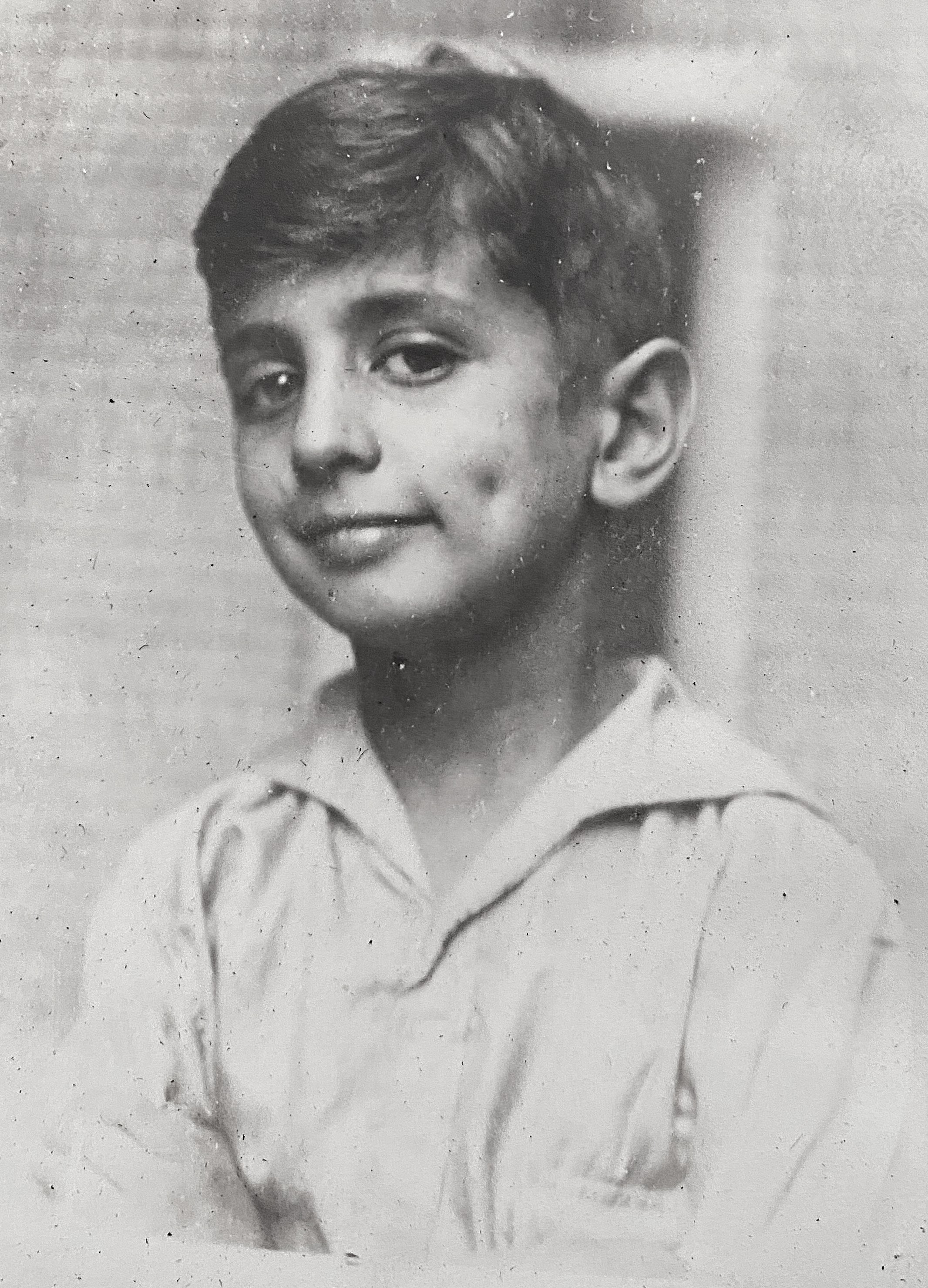
Irve Tunick as a child

== Writing career ==
Tunick first started his career writing for radio in the continuity department for the radio station WINS. While there he worked on a popular children's radio series called Cowboy Tom's Roundup. In August 1938 at only twenty-six years old, Tunick was hired to work in the Office of Education for the Department of the Interior in Washington, D.C. He was hired to help on a series that was originally called Government at Work (but would later be retitled Democracy in Action), and he went on to work on other programs for the federal government including The World is Yours (1936–1940), Gallant American Women (1940), and Freedom's People (1942).

=== Radio ===
==== Democracy in Action ====
In 1938, United States Commissioner of Education John Ward Studebaker hired Tunick to work on the new radio program funded by the government that was intended to explain the benefits of the Federal government of the United States to the people. In Fall 1938, Tunick worked on scripts for the show that discussed the Bureau of the Budget (now the Office of Management and Budget), the Federal Reserve, and the Social Security system. Commissioner Studebaker was reported as thinking highly of Tunick's work with an internal report stating "[Studebaker] is particularly pleased with Tunick's work and he will concentrate on the Gov't series."

The show went through a variety of changes during the course of production. Originally named Government at Work, the showrunners thought of retitling it Making Democracy Work given the threat to democracy during the late 1930s with one person explaining that government "is a cold word" that "conveys the notion of control whereas 'democracy' in addition to being a warm word conveys the idea of participation". Later, the show was internally called Of the People with a new objective of the show being to show off the benefits of democracy in comparison to "dictatorship". The direction of the show was changed again when it was intended to be incorporated into exhibits related to the 1939 New York World's Fair to show off the government's ability to help its citizens, but due to logistical difficulties the show could not be incorporated into the exhibits for the fair. CBS then rejected the proposed name of the show Of the People, and as a result, the creators of the show debated over thirty other proposed names including: Democracy Must Be Heard, Let the People Speak, The People—Yes!, Democracy—For Life!, Blessings of Liberty, United We Stated, and More Perfect Union. At the end it was retitled Democracy in Action and it was reported that President Franklin D. Roosevelt even favored the name: "[I] checked directly with the President concerning the title and was pleased to learn that he was already familiar with our cooperative plan and in favor of the title Democracy in Action.'" Tunick ended up leaving the project after his contract ended in March 1939 and was replaced by Merrill Denison, a well known radio dramatist who had worked in the United States and Canada. The show garnered critical success during its run.

==== The World Is Yours ====
After leaving Democracy in Action, Tunick went on to work on The World Is Yours where he gained a reputation as a good scriptwriter for radio. This radio program was sponsored by the Office of Education and the Smithsonian Institution and broadcast on CBS as a weekly thirty-minute radio show that "dramatized science" and aired Sunday afternoons from June 7, 1936, to May 10, 1942, as part of the Educational Radio Project, funded by the Works Progress Administration.

For this show, Tunick had to write a script a week on various scientific issues including such topics as: the electron microscope, the history of vitamins, Herbert Ward, John Ericsson, the Norsemen in Greenland, Gilbert Stuart, Sir Walter Raleigh, emeralds, Samuel Slater, aircraft engines, the silk industry, and Zebulon Pike.

==== Gallant American Woman ====
Tunick next helped out on the series Gallant American Woman, which was designed to describe how women had contributed to the building of America. Tunick became briefly involved in the project in 1940 when the "scriptwriting fell behind schedule" for the radio show.

==== Freedom's people ====
In the early 1940s, Ambrose Caliver, a Black official in the Office of Education, reached out to Tunick who was then "one of the most respected and successful scriptwriters in educational radio" to assist with creating Freedom's People, a broadcast by NBC from 1941 to 1942 that explored this history and culture of African Americans to further shore up support for Civil Rights. Although Tunick was not Black and the show was focused on being a radio show that was produced and performed by Blacks, he was still recruited because of his expertise in writing "inventive and lively scripts" and his "skills as a professional educational scriptwriter".

Tunick was not clear on how to approach the subject of creating a radio broadcast that would showcase the history of Black Americans, their quest for Civil Rights, and supporting some themes of the show including Christianity and democracy. Tunick at times "struggled to work and help craft a story that included aspects with both ideas of slavery and Christian democracy".

Early on there was a concern that Frank Wilson, who would be the narrator for the show, sounded too much like a white man and this would undercut the argument that the program was being produced and performed by Blacks to showcase achievements in the Black community. One advisor to the show explained the concern that the audience could not see who was producing the show so getting the sound right was very important: "Since we do not have television we depend upon our ears and not our eyes." Tunick helped coach Wilson on how to sound more like a member of the Black community and not "too much like a white man" in his radio broadcasts to appease the concerns of the producers. Tunick also helped integrate music into all of the programing, which helped make it more effective.

After Tunick drafted the scripts, they would be reviewed by members of an Advisory Committee in Washington D.C. that included Ambrose Caliver along with others from the Southern Education Foundation, a local school principal, and Joseph R. Houchins, an expert in statistics at the United States Census Bureau. This advisory committee helped review the scripts to ensure that they accurately discussed the Black community as claimed. At the time, it was a rare to have people from the Black community be involved in the production of a radio show, and this separated it from other programs at the time.

Caliver believed that it was important to have a popular first show to sustain the series so he decided to focus the first show to how Black culture had contributed to music rather than focus the first show on the contributions to science and discovery. Tunick wrote the first script for the show and it "exceeded the expectations of many committee members." Some were "pleasantly surprised at the social punch of the script" and impressed with the fact that the show had "'much more social value' than anything [they] had ever heard on the air". The first show was broadcast in November 1941, and the show would run until 1942.

=== Radio work after leaving the government ===
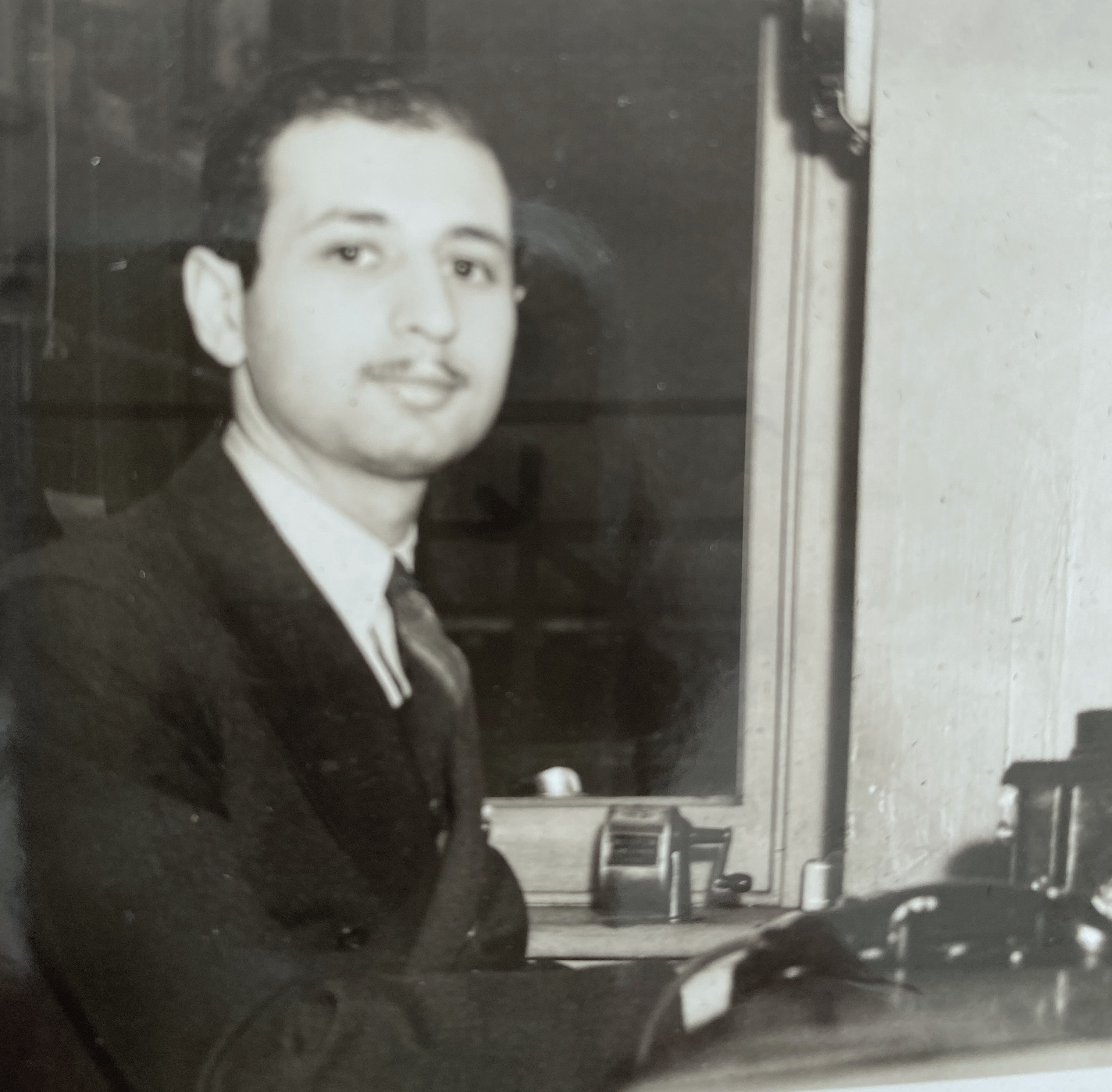
Irve Tunick as an adult

In 1942, Tunick left the government and organized a production company with Robert L. Cotton. After World War II, Tunick returned to New York City. Working on commercial radio programs, Tunick wrote for such programs as: Towards a Better World (1943–1944), The American School of the Air (1944–1945), CBS Is There (1947–1948), The Eternal Light (1947–1950), You are There (1947–1950) and Cavalcade of America (1949–1953).

Robert Lewis Shayon discussed working with Tunick on the radio program CBS Is There and You are There in his book, Odyssey in Prime Time. Shayon said that in the early days of the radio program CBS Is There, he had assigned a variety of freelance writers, including Tunick, to write a script for each show. The concept of the show was that it would be a live radio news report but from famous historical events. Tunick's first script was a radio play titled "The Last Days of Pompeii" that envisioned a live broadcast of events in Pompeii that is interrupted by the eruption of the volcano. Shayon stated that he gave Tunick five weeks to research the Pompeii eruption and deliver the script. After dealing with several writers for the series, Shayon stated that only Tunick and Michael Sklar were ever able to consistently provide him with scripts that needed few re-writes, and eventually he just used Tunick and Sklar to write all the scripts to reduce having to rework them. After the show was cancelled Tunick would try to help Shayon get work on East Side/West Side, a television series in the 1960s, but to no avail.

By 1949, Tunick estimated that he had written about 700 to 800 scripts for radio with about one per week since he began writing in 1938. Tunick then began writing scripts for the television industry and later scripts for movies.

=== Television ===
Transitioning to television in the 1950s, Tunick wrote for several series, including Armstrong Circle Theatre (1955–1963), Studio One (1951–1952), Combat! (1966),The Bold Ones, Bonanza, Ironside, and The F.B.I.

==== Armstrong Circle Theater ====
In 1951, Tunick finished his 1000th radio and TV script after writing for fourteen years. The script was for Armstrong Circle Theatre, which also happened to coincide with their 100th episode. The script dealt with James Otis Jr., a founding father of the United States who gave an almost five-hour speech in the State House in February 1761 to protest the British Writs of Assistance. Tunick notably wrote in that script the following description of Boston in the episode: "Boston is a city founded on complaint, nourished by remonstrance, and perpetuated by a race of lawyers who are born into the world with a petition in one hand and a writ in the other. On Judgment Day the Hand of the Lord will undoubtedly be stayed by some infernal litigation stilling pending in the courts of Boston!"

While working on Armstrong Circle Theater, Tunick was involved in a famous episode involving allegations of extraterrestrials. Tunick had worked with Donald Keyhoe, author of the book The Flying Saucers Are Real, and the United States Air Force to both agree to appear for a live broadcast to discuss sightings of UFOs in an episode titled "U.F.O. — The Enigma of the Skies." The show aired live on January 22, 1958. Prior to the show, Tunick had been negotiating with Keyhoe and the Air Force regarding what could appear on the show even staying up until 4 am to negotiate the script. As negotiations wore on, Keyhoe becoming more frustrated as more information he was prepared to show was cut. Tunick apologetically explained that it was not his decision and that "the Armstrong Company won't stand for an open battle with the Air Force." Keyhoe reluctantly decided to continue with the appearance despite the changes, but went off-script during the broadcast and had his microphone turned off by the producer Robert Costello right after he said: "And now I'm going to reveal something that has never been disclosed before...." Keyhoe continue to appear speaking on the television screen but without any sound leading to conspiracy theories that the military had cut Keyhoe's mike during the episode. Keyhoe thought about indignantly going to the press to protest the censorship right after the incident but realized that such a move would also hurt Costello and Tunick who he also believed were "victims" of pressure from the government and so gave up the idea. Later Keyhoe would appear on The Mike Wallace Interview on ABC on March 8, 1958, to explain what had happened on the episode.

In another episode while working on Armstrong Circle Theatre, Tunick once had a situation where they would only cast a gentile to play a Jewish role so the show would not appear too Jewish. Tunick had written a script involving the Dead Sea Scrolls along with a Jewish family in Israel. Tunick brought in the Jewish actor, Joseph Yadin, to play the father in the family drama. Fearing that the show would be seen as a "Jewish show", the backers of the show cast an actress who was used to playing an Irish mother in a soap opera as the mother in the drama. Tunick said that when he heard the actress say the lines with a "Gaelic intonation", "I don't have much hair on my head but the little I had stood up and waved."

==== The Witness ====
In 1960, Tunick created and wrote The Witness, a series that dramatized the lives of notorious figures through simulated hearings before a fictional committee. When The Witness first aired, TIME magazine described it as "one of the more exciting shows to appear in a long time" and said it captured the disorganized spectacle of these types of hearings. The reviewer went on to state that Telly Savalas, "a comparatively unknown actor" at the time, did a great job in the first episode depicting the real life gangster "Lucky" Luciano and demonstrated his "gutter cynicism, arrogance, brutality" and yet was at moments "pathetic." To add to the authenticity of the show, the production featured real lawyers as actors including Richard Steel, William Geoghan Jr., Charles Haydon, and Benedict Ginsberg. The show also attempted to be more spontaneous allowing the attorneys to even ad-lib their arguments at times. The show later would have episodes that depicted such notable people as Huey Long, Arnold Rothstein, "Shoeless" Joe Jackson, and former New York Mayor Jimmy Walker. The show even had Peter Falk return to working with Tunick after working on Murder Inc. to reprise the role of Abraham "Kid Twist" Reles.

==== East Side/West Side ====
In the early 1960s, Tunick managed to get a job on the television show East Side/West Side, a drama on CBS starring George C Scott, due to some good luck. As producer Don Kranze tells it:

[The script supervisor that Scott recommended] [d]oesn't show up for work...At that point, and this is the truth, when [producer David Susskind] hears that this guy doesn't show up, who's in his office at that time? Irve Tunick. He's used Irve over the years. Irve sort of writes documentary-type scripts. At that point, he says, ‘How would you like to be the script editor?’ Irve says okay. That's how he got hired – happened to be in the office the day that this guy quit . . . Irve [took the show] to the next step. He called in good writers, gave them the idea what the show was about, and [organized] it into a workable situation.

Tunick ended up writing the teleplay for the second episode of East Side/West Side called "Age of Consent".

==== Other work ====
In 1960, Tunick joined a discussion panel for the Fund for the Republic described as bringing together "three top TV dramatists" with himself and fellow television writers Rod Serling and Robert Alan Aurthur to converse about the state of television in an event titled "The Relation of the Writer to Television." In the discussion, the three talked about how sponsors had killed various efforts to depict certain actions in televisions programs with Tunick decrying how there is a "provincialism and an isolation about Madison Ave. that enters into all of this" and Serling explaining how his story regarding the Emmett Till case was not permitted to be broadcast until the "play was relocated to New England."

Tunick's last documented script that made it on to television was for "The Chasers", the fifth episode of the second series of Police Woman, which aired in October 1975. That episode featured Angie Dickinson in the title role and a young Ian McShane credited as a special guest star.

==== Founder and President of the Eastern Region of the Television Writers of America ====
In the 1940s, various writers for radio banded together to form the Radio Writers Union. Later, many of the same people would go on to form a union related to television writers called the Television Writers of America including Dick Powell, Frank Tarloff, Carl Reiner, Norman Lear and Larry Gelbart. In the 1950s the Televisions Writers of America was split between an eastern and western division. Tunick founded the Eastern Region of the Television Writers of America and became the organization's president with Howard Cosell as their attorney, who was still practicing law at the time and had not entered into broadcasting.

In January 1954, Joan LaCour Scott the executive secretary for the Western Region of the Televisions Writers of America invoked her Fifth Amendment rights to refuse to testify before the House Un-American Activities Committee regarding any potential communist connections. In response to this refusal to cooperate, Tunick along with ten other members from the Eastern Region's executive board and their attorney Howard Cosell resigned from the union citing "a complete difference of opinion on basic union principles." Tunick explained his actions by stating that the inability of LaCour to testify before the committee hearing put the union in an "untenable position at the bargaining table" and required the union to be involved in an area outside of its concern by forcing it to be involved in the "political or philosophical convictions of a paid employee." The resignation of Tunick and others dealt a fatal blow to the Televisions Writers of America, which ended in 1954, and the Writers Guild of America was formed as a new union to fill the vacuum.

=== Film ===
In addition to writing scripts for TV, Tunick also worked on as a writer for several films. He wrote the screenplay for Lady of Vengeance (1957) and for High Hell (1958), both directed by Burt Balaban.

In 1960, Tunick co-wrote the screenplay for Murder, Inc., a film depicting the rise and fall of a notorious crime syndicate of the same name. This film would go on to earn an Academy Award for Best Actor nomination for Peter Falk acting as Abraham "Kid Twist" Reles. Peter Falk stated that unlike his first film Wind Across the Everglades, "Murder Inc. was a script of substance" about a "gang that other gangs could hire for murder." Falk would return to play the role of Kid Twist a year later after the release of the movie in an episode of Tunick's The Witness.

== Writing and legacy ==
Through working on hundreds of scripts over the years, Tunick developed his method of writing scripts quickly. When Tunick was writing scripts for non-fiction radio early in his career, he found that his biggest problem was doing the necessary research to support the script in the limited time he had. However, Tunick solved this problem by always trying to find the one main "authoritative book" on the subject he was researching and focusing on that to develop his scripts.

Tunick believed that his nonfiction broadcasts were not really about educating, but rather about sparking curiosity. He saw them as a way to encourage listeners to explore topics further on their own. As he put it: "We're not trying to teach anybody anything...We're not sure that we could if we tried. We try to stimulate the listeners, get them to use the program as a springboard for some mental digging of their own."

Tunick liked to use references to poetry in his radio broadcasts because of the "essential economy of poetry" but usually would not have enough time to incorporate such references.

Tunick also found that unlike other writers, he could not outline the story first, and instead he had to simply just start writing his scripts after thinking about the subject for a bit. Tunick would often write his scripts and send them off without ever editing them because of the time pressures. When working in radio in his early days, Tunick would generally "prepare six hours of radio programs each week." Tunick realized that he would often have to churn out work quickly without being able to polish his prose aesthetically so he advised others to do the same and not think about their scripts as a form of art: "Once you think you're an artist...you're through."

"“I simply can’t produce an outline in advance, to save my life. I just mull over what I’ve read, trying to hit on a story idea on which I can build the facts I want to present. Then I sit down at my typewriter, put in five carbons, and start typing. I’m usually just as surprised as anyone else is at the result. And yet I know other writers- and very fine ones—who can’t produce until they’ve worked for hours over a detailed outline."
— Irve Tunick in 1949 describing his writing process.

One of Tunick's rules for producing a good radio scripts was always to make sure that the script flowed from one subject to another and did not "jerk along unevenly". Another rule of Tunick's was to always make sure that the secondary characters in a story were memorable. Tunick felt that the main character was easy to make memorable but that "a writer must give careful, painstaking attention to his minor characters to make them live, to make them mean something" and that this was something that the writer had to do because "[t]he best actor in the world can’t build a living character out of lines that a writer hasn't developed carefully and shaped into a person."

While some writers would look down upon using a narrator as a script device, Tunick felt that the narrator could be a "integral part" of the story as long as the writer gives the narrator some character and some opinion of the events that are transpiring: "The narrator may be gently amused by the proceedings: he talks with his tongue in check. Or he may be angry: he spits out his words, expressing his contempt and fury. The important thing is that he does have an attitude. He’s a personality, with a reason for existing.”

Tunick's writing was thought of so highly that the writer and critic Marya Mannes wrote in 1960 that:

What we are speaking of here is the creative writer who produces a whole, the writer of thought in terms of emotion, the dramatist. In the realm of imagination, as against documentation, he is the writer who has brought television its most exciting and most powerful moments...Whether this memory includes the names of the authors is doubtful, which is all the more reason for their mention here: Reginald Rose, David Davidson, David Shaw, Gore Vidal, Alvin Boretz, Ernest Kinoy, David Karp, James Lee, Sumner Locke Elliott, Horton Foote, Tad Mosel, Irve Tunick – all belong in the company of writers who reached their peak of activity in the middle 50's...

For his writing efforts, Tunick won the Robert E. Sherwood and George Foster Peabody Awards for achievements in the scriptwriting field.

== Personal life ==
Tunick married twice: first to Adele Lehnstul, who died in 1981, and later to Bea Greenberg. Adele Lehnstul, an alumnus of Hunter College wrote in her alumni magazine in 1964 the importance of supporting New York Public schools desegregation efforts to ensure all students had adequate schooling after the decision of Brown v. Board of Education.

Tunick had three children: Carol Maxfield, Richard Tunick, and Lisa Sarasohn. He had eight grandchildren at the time of his death.

On September 5, 1987, at age 75, Irve Tunick died from a cerebral hemorrahage at Putnam Hospital Center in Carmel, New York.

== Selected works ==
Radio

- Democracy in Action – scriptwriter
- The World Is Yours – scriptwriter (radio series, 1937–1941)
- Gallant American Women – scriptwriter (1940)
- Freedom's People– scriptwriter
- The Bold Ones – scriptwriter
- Towards a Better World – scriptwriter (1943–1944)
- The American School of the Air – scriptwriter (1944–1945)
- CBS Is There – scriptwriter (1947–1948)
- The Eternal Light – scriptwriter (1947–1950)
- You are There – scriptwriter (1947–1950)
- Cavalcade of America – scriptwriter (1949–1953).
- The American School of the Air – scriptwriter
- Words at War – scriptwriter

TV

- Studio One – scriptwriter
- The Witness – creator/written by- 9 episodes (1960–1961)
- Bonanza – scriptwriter
- Armstrong Circle Theatre – scriptwriter (1950) – 16 episodes – (1954–1963)
- East West/West Side – scriptwriter (1963)
- Ironside – scriptwriter
- The F.B.I.- scriptwriter
- Police Woman – scriptwriter (1975)
- Eight Witnesses – TV movie – Story editor – (1954)
- The Sergeant and the Spy TV Movie – Story editor – (1954)

Movies

- Lady of Vengeance (1957) – writer
- High Hell (1958) – writer
- Murder, Inc. (1960) – co-writer along with Mel Barr

== Bibliography ==
- Amar, Akhil Reed (2021). The Words That Made Us: America's Constitutional Conversation, 1760–1840. New York: Basic Books. ISBN 978-0-465-09635-0. OCLC 1195459078.
- Bloom, John (2010). There you have it : the life, legacy, and legend of Howard Cosell. University of Massachusetts Press. ISBN 978-1-558-49837-2.
- Ellett, Ryan (2017). Radio Drama and Comedy Writers, 1928-1962. McFarland, Incorporated, Publishers. ISBN 978-1-476-62980-3.
- Falk, Peter (2006). Just one more thing. Carroll & Graf Publishers. ISBN 978-0-09-950955-4.
- Goodman, David; Hayes, Joy Elizabeth (2022). New Deal radio : the educational radio project. Rutgers University Press. ISBN 978-1-978-81746-3.
- Kallsen, T.J; McCoy, D.E. (1963). Rhetoric and Reading Order and Idea. Dodd, Mead & Company. p. 37 – via Internet Archive.
- Kaplan, Milton Allen (1949). Radio and Poetry. Columbia University Press. ISBN 978-0-23-188909-4.
- Keyhoe, Donald E. (1960). Flying Saucers: Top Secret. New York: G.P. Putnam's Sons. OCLC 5527262.
- Savage, Barbara Dianne (1999). Broadcasting Freedom: Radio, War, and the Politics of Race, 1938–1948. UNC Press Books. ISBN 978-0-807-84804-3.
- Shayon, Robert Lewis (2001). Odyssey in Prime Time. Waymark Press. ISBN 978-0-97-054690-6.
- Westkaemper, Emily (2017). Selling Women's History: Packaging Feminism in Twentieth-Century American Popular Culture. New Brunswick, New Jersey: Rutgers University Press. ISBN 978-0-81-357632-9.
