= Black Cabinet =

African American advisors to President Franklin D. Roosevelt

Roosevelt's black advisors in 1938 (Note: Front row, left to right: Dr. Ambrose Caliver, Dr. Roscoe C. Brown, Dr. Robert C. Weaver, Joseph H. Evans, Dr. Frank Horne, Mary McLeod Bethune, Lt. Lawrence A. Oxley, Dr. William J. Thompkins, Charles E. Hall, William I. Houston, Ralph E. Mizelle. Back row, left to right: Dewey R. Jones, Edgar Brown, J. Parker Prescott, Edward H. Lawson, Jr., Arthur Weisiger, Alfred Edgar Smith, Henry A. Hunt, John W. Whitten, Joseph R. Houchins.)

The Black Cabinet was an organized but unofficial group of African-American advisors to President Franklin D. Roosevelt. African-American federal employees in the executive branch formed what they called the Federal Council of Negro Affairs to work to influence federal policy. In his years as president (1933-1945), Roosevelt, like all presidents before him, did not nominate African Americans to be secretary nor undersecretary in his official presidential cabinet, (Note: Secretary of Housing and Urban Devolvement Robert C. Weaver became the first principal in the cabinet but not until 1966; J. Ernest Wilkins Sr. was also appointed after Roosevelt, as undersecretary of labor in 1954.) but by mid-1935, there were 45 African Americans working in executive roles in federal departments and New Deal agencies, and as presidential advisers. Roosevelt gave no formal recognition to the ad hoc council, although he used members as advisers and First Lady Eleanor Roosevelt encouraged the council. Although many have ascribed the term "Black Cabinet" to Mary McLeod Bethune, who, during the Roosevelt administration, was the first Black person to lead a federal agency, African American newspapers had earlier used it to describe some informal Black advisors to earlier presidents.

== History ==
Although the council was concerned with civil rights, Franklin D. Roosevelt believed there were larger problems to be addressed than racial inequality during the wartime years; he was also struggling to maintain the support of the Southern white Congressional Democrats. Roosevelt declined to support legislation banning the use of the poll tax in the South and did not support legislation to make lynching a federal offense.

The Black Cabinet, with Eleanor Roosevelt's support, worked to ensure that African Americans received 10 percent of welfare funds. The Council argued that black citizens were underrepresented among recipients of aid under the New Deal, in large part because Southern Democrats had influenced the structure and implementation of programs to aid their white constituents. For instance, the Agricultural Adjustment Administration helped farmers but did not help farmworkers; farm owners were given the incentive to cut farm production, reducing the need for labor. Programs such as the Works Projects Administration (WPA), and the National Youth Administration (NYA) attempted to direct 10 percent of funds to African Americans (as their proportion of the US population). These agencies set up separate all-black units with the same pay and conditions as those in white units, to which black voters responded favorably.

Mary McLeod Bethune served as an informal organizer of the council, as well as the Director of Negro Affairs in the National Youth Administration. Rayford Wittingham Logan drafted Roosevelt's executive order prohibiting the exclusion of African Americans from the military in World War II. Other leaders included William H. Hastie and Robert C. Weaver. The leaders associated with the Black Cabinet are often credited with laying part of the foundation of the Civil Rights Movement that developed in strength in the postwar years.

The Council tried to create jobs and other opportunities for unemployed African Americans; concentrated in rural areas of the South, African Americans made up about twenty percent of the poor in the Depression Era. They were often the first to be let go from industrial jobs. Most African Americans did not benefit from some of the New Deal Acts.

The WPA created agencies that employed creative people in a variety of jobs, such as writers, artists, and photographers. WPA murals were painted and WPA sculptures were commissioned for numerous federal buildings that were constructed during this period. Photographers documented families across the South and in northern cities. The Federal Writers' Project paid its workers $20 a week, and they wrote histories of every state in the Union, covering major cities in addition.

Under Roscoe E. Lewis, the Virginia Writers' Project sent out an all-black unit of writers to interview formerly enslaved African Americans. Such accounts were also solicited in interviews in other states. The Slave Narrative Collection of the Federal Writers' Project stands as one of the most enduring and noteworthy achievements of the WPA.

Members of the group worked officially and unofficially in their agencies to provide insight into the needs of African Americans. In the past, there had never been so many African Americans chosen at one time to work in the federal government together for the express benefit of African Americans. The 45 primarily comprised an advisory group to the administration. Eleanor Roosevelt was said to encourage the formation of the Black Cabinet to help shape New Deal programs.

== Members ==
Most members were not politicians but rather community leaders, scholars, and activists. Prominent members included Dr. Robert C. Weaver, a young economist from Harvard University and a race relations adviser. He worked with the White House to provide more opportunities for African Americans. In 1966 he became the first African American cabinet member, appointed by Lyndon B. Johnson as Secretary of the newly created Department of Housing and Urban Development. During the 1970s, Weaver served as the national director of the Municipal Assistance Corporation, which was formed during New York City's financial crisis. Another prominent member of Roosevelt's Black Cabinet was Eugene K. Jones, the Executive Secretary of the National Urban League, a major civil rights organization.

One of the most well-known members, and the only woman, was Mary McLeod Bethune. Bethune's political affinity to the Roosevelts was so strong that she changed her party allegiance. Bethune was very closely tied to the community and believed she knew what African Americans really wanted. She was looked upon very highly by other members of the cabinet, and the younger men called her "Ma Bethune". Bethune was a personal friend of Eleanor Roosevelt and, uniquely among the cabinet, had access to the White House. Their friendship began during a luncheon when Eleanor Roosevelt sat Bethune to the right of the president, considered the seat of honor. Franklin Roosevelt was so impressed by one of Bethune's speeches that he appointed her to the Division of Negro Affairs in the newly created National Youth Administration.

Members of this group in 1938 included the following:

- Alfred Edgar Smith, Works Projects Administration
- Dr. Ambrose Caliver, Department of the Interior
- Arthur Weiseger, Department of Labor
- Charles E. Hall, Department of Commerce
- Constance E.H. Daniel, Department of Agriculture
- Dewey R. Jones, Department of the Interior;
- Edgar G. Brown, Civilian Conservation Corps
- Edward H. Lawson, Jr., Works Projects Administration
- Henry A. Hunt, Farm Credit Administration
- J. Parker Prescott, Housing Authority
- John W. Whitten, Works Projects Administration
- Joseph H. Evans, Farm Security Administration
- Joseph R. Houchins, Department of Commerce
- Lawrence A. Oxley, Department of Labor
- Mary McLeod Bethune, National Youth Administration
- Ralph E. Mizelle, US Postal Service
- Dr. Robert C. Weaver, Federal Housing Administration
- Dr. Roscoe C. Brown, Sr., Public Health Service
- William I. Houston, Department of Justice
- Dr. William J. Thomkins, Recorder of Deeds

At various times, others included:

- Dr. Charles L. Franklin, Social Security Board
- Eugene Kinckle Jones, Department of Commerce
- Frank Smith Horne, optometrist, college administrator, and lyricist
- William J. Trent, Federal Works Agency
- William H. Hastie, attorney, Department of the Interior

== See also ==
- Civil rights movement (1896–1954)
- List of African-American United States Cabinet members
- United States Cabinet

== Bibliography ==
- Barron, James (19 July 1997). "Robert C. Weaver, 89, First Black Cabinet Member, Dies". New York Times.
- Burwell, N. Yolanda (2001). "Lawrence A. Oxley: Defining state public welfare among African Americans". In Carlton-LaNey, Iris (ed.). African American leadership: An empowerment tradition in social welfare history. Washington, DC: NASW Press. pp. 99–110. ISBN 9780871013170.
- Fleming, Thomas C. (8 September 1999). "Reflections on Black History: Part 83, The Black Cabinet". Columbus Free Press.
- "African American History". Microsoft Encarta Online Encyclopedia. Microsoft. Archived from the original on 28 October 2009.
- Hughes, Langston; Meltzer, Milton; Lincoln, C. Eric (1973). A Pictorial History of the Negro in America (3rd rev ed.). New York: Crown Publishers.
- Oxley, Lawrence A. (1927). The North Carolina Negro. s.l.: s.n., Reprinted from the November 1927 Welfare Magazine
- Oxley, Lawrence A. (July 1940). "Employment Security and the Negro". Employment Security Review. 7 (7): 12–15.
- Walton, Hanes (1985). Invisible politics: Black political behavior. Albany: State University of New York Press. ISBN 0873959663.
- Weiss, Nancy J. (1983). Farewell to the party of Lincoln: Black politics in the age of FDR. Princeton, NJ: Princeton University Press. ISBN 0691047030.
- Yetman, Norman R. "An Introduction to the WPA Slave Narratives | Articles and Essays | Born in Slavery: Slave Narratives from the Federal Writers' Project, 1936-1938 | Digital Collections | Library of Congress". Library of Congress.
