= The World Is Yours =

The World Is Yours may refer to:

== Film, television and radio ==
- The World Is Yours (film), a 2018 French film
- The World Is Yours (TV series), 1951
- The World Is Yours (radio show), 1936–1942
- "The World Is Yours" (Bodies), a 2023 television episode

== Gaming ==
- Scarface: The World Is Yours, a video game based on the 1983 movie Scarface

== Music ==
=== Albums ===
- The Wörld Is Yours, by Motörhead, 2010
- The World Is Yours (Scarface album), 1993
- The World Is Yours (Ian Brown album), 2007
- The World Is Yours (The Union album), 2013
- The World Is Yours (Rich the Kid album), 2018
- World Is Yours (album), a 2009 album by Mass of the Fermenting Dregs
- The World Is Yours, a 2007 EP by Andy Grammer
- The World Is Yours, a 2017 album by Slim Thug
- The World Is Yours, a 2017 EP by Jefe

=== Songs ===
- "The World Is Yours" (Nas song), 1994
- "The World Is Yours" (Faith No More song), 1998
- "The World is Yours", a song by Caravan from the 1972 album Waterloo Lily
- "The World Is Yours" a song by 3 Colours Red from the 2004 album The Union of Souls
- "The World Is Yours", a song by AKA from the 2018 album Touch My Blood
- "The World Is Yours", a song by Arch Enemy from the 2017 album Will to Power

== See also ==
- Scarface (1932 film), features the slogan "The World is Yours"
- Scarface (1983 film), features the slogan "The World is Yours"
