= Trooper Salute =

- Origin: Nagoya, Japan
- Genres: Symphonic indie rock, indie pop, alternative rock, pop
- Years active: 2024–present
- Label: EIGHT BEATER • Buriki Records
- Website: https://troopersalute.com/

Trooper Salute (Hepburn: トルーパーソリュート) is a five-member symphonic indie rock band formed at a university light music club in Nagoya, Japan. The group began full-scale activities in 2024 and gained attention for their blend of melodic pop, alternative textures, distinctive lyrical wordplay, and layered ensemble arrangements. Following the release of two extended plays in 2024 and 2025, the band released its debut studio album, Tomodachi Ga Imashita (友達がいました), on 17 June 2026 through Buriki Records and EIGHT BEATER. The album marked the culmination of a musical direction that the band had previously described as the goal of its early releases and established Trooper Salute as one of the emerging acts in Japan's indie rock scene.

== History ==
=== Origins and early years ===
Principal songwriter and keyboardist Hayato Komiya began composing using digital audio workstations in high school and developed an interest in contemporary Japanese pop and alternative production. Around that time he was influenced by the idol-punk group BiSH and by a radio program hosted by producer Kentaro Matsukuma which included a listener demo corner. Komiya submitted an instrumental demo that was aired and received feedback suggesting the material would be better realized by a full band; that feedback prompted plans to form a band after entering university.

The band initially performed with a different vocalist. Musashi, who had previously collaborated with Komiya on visual art for his solo projects, joined later as vocalist after Komiya heard her sing at karaoke and invited her to participate. Musashi had sung in a middle school choir but had otherwise been primarily engaged in visual art before joining the group.

Trooper Salute began active performing in 2024. The group supported touring acts both domestically and internationally during their first year and used live performance as a key part of their arrangement process, often testing unfinished songs in concert before finalizing arrangements.

=== Debut EP, exposure and festival appearances ===
In late 2024 the band released a debut EP titled Trooper Salute. The release primarily compiled the band’s more pop-oriented material. Following the EP’s release the band gained increased visibility. In 2025 they performed at major festivals including the Fuji Rock Festival. A broadcast on the music talk program EIGHT-JAM, in which musician Kawatani Enon (川谷絵音) selected one of the band’s songs for a year-end list, produced a notable surge in social media followers and streaming listeners.

=== Second EP and collaboration ===
In 2025 the band released a second EP titled Trooper Salute 2. The record was conceived as a gradient between the pop orientation of the debut EP and a forthcoming full-length album with a darker, alternative focus. The EP’s structure was intentionally arranged to begin with brighter, melodic tracks and transition into darker, more instrumentally driven pieces.

One of the darker tracks, originally written before the band’s formation, drew influence from the sound of Mass of the Fermenting Dregs. That track, a breakup-themed song with a darker tone, was later released on the second EP. The song features guest vocals from singer-songwriter Yoshizawa Kayoko (吉澤嘉代子) after she expressed interest in the band’s music following social media exposure and radio airplay.

=== Tomodachi Ga Imashita (友達がいました) ===
Shortly after releasing their single, 絶縁 (Zetsuen), Trooper Salute released their debut album titled Tomodachi Ga Imashita. Featuring 12 tracks (including Zetsuen) and one bonus track on physical releases, Tomodachi Ga Imashita is considered one of their most in-depth projects to date.

The primary songwriter and keyboardist of the band, Hayato Komiya, stated that he "felt this overwhelming sadness" watching others enter adulthood, which inspired him to write a song called "Tomodachi Ga Imashita" ("I Had Friends"). This later became the title track and namesake of the band's debut album, released on June 17.

Qobuz reviewed the album, calling the band "one of the most promising bands on the Japanese alternative scene", and calling the album "a rich record that is both carefree and masterfully controlled".

== Musical style and creative process ==
Trooper Salute’s music blends pop melodies with alternative rock structures and orchestral textures. Their arrangements frequently feature distinct melodic phrases played by multiple instruments rather than conventional backing parts. The band emphasizes interplay, use of space, and rhythmic layering.

Komiya serves as the principal composer. In the band’s early stages he produced detailed DTM demos which the other members reproduced and arranged. Over time the group shifted to a rehearsal-based workflow in which Komiya presents chord progressions, melodies, and lyrical concepts verbally in the studio and the band develops arrangements collectively. The group often completes the bulk of an arrangement within a short series of rehearsals and then tests the material live, using audience response to refine the songs.

Lyrics are typically written after melodic and harmonic frameworks are established. Komiya selects words for visual and phonetic qualities and prioritizes singability and rhythmic fit. On the second EP the band expanded production elements relative to the debut EP and incorporated harmonies, choruses, synthesizers, and additional percussion.

== Members ==
Hayato Komiya (小宮颯斗) – Keyboards, principal songwriter

Musashi (ムサシ) – Vocals 2026.

Ron Sangen – Bass

Kion Umemura – Drums

Junsei Iwai – Guitar

== Discography ==
=== Albums ===
• Tomodachi Ga Imashita (2026)

=== Extended plays ===
• Trooper Salute (2024)

• Trooper Salute 2 (2025)

=== Singles ===
• 美人, Bijin (2024)

• 天使ちゃんだよ, Tenshi-chan dayo (2025)

• 不治, Fuji (2025)

• 絶縁, Zetsuen (2026)

• 埒, Rachi (2026)

== Reception and impact ==
Early releases and festival appearances increased Trooper Salute’s visibility in the Japanese indie scene. Radio exposure and endorsements contributed to streaming and social media growth. The band has described their two EPs as a business card that completes an initial chapter and prepares the group for a forthcoming full-length concept album.
