= Aoi, Koi, Daidaiiro No Hi =

Song by Mass of the Fermenting Dregs

from the album World is Yours (EP)
- Released: January 21, 2009 (EP release)
- Recorded: 2008
- Genre: Shoegaze; noise rock; alternative rock
- Length: 4:41
- Label: Avocado Records
- Songwriters: Natsuko Miyamoto (lyrics); Isao Yoshino (music)
- Producer: Hirokazu Satō

"Aoi, Koi, Daidaiiro No Hi" (Japanese: 青い、濃い、橙色の日; Romanized: Aoi, Koi, Daidaīro No Hi; English translation: "Blue, Deep and Orange Day") is a song by the Japanese alternative rock group Mass of the Fermenting Dregs. It was released on January 21, 2009, released by the music label, Avocado Records. It is the second track on the EP "World is Yours".

== Composition ==
The songwriting credits for "Aoi, Koi, Daidaiiro No Hi" are split between two members of the group. Natsuko Miyamoto, the band's vocalist and bassist, is officially credited with writing the lyrics. The musical arrangement and composition were created by the band's drummer, Isao Yoshino. The track was recorded in 2008 and was ultimately produced by Hirokazu Satō for its inclusion on the World Is Yours EP in early 2009.

== Release formats ==
Release formats for "Aoi, Koi, Daidaiiro No Hi" (Track on World Is Yours)
Format	Release Date	Label	Status/Notes
Compact disc (CD)	January 21, 2009	AVOCADO Records	Original physical release of the album; the song is track 2.
Digital distribution	July 21, 2021	Universal Music Group	Worldwide digital streaming and purchase availability.

== Critical reception ==
Following the release of World Is Yours, the track "Aoi, Koi, Daidaiiro No Hi" received coverage in domestic music publications. A review from CD Journal described the overall sound of the album—of which this track is a key part—as a "loud and speedy development" that captures the dynamic intensity of the band's live performances. The Japanese language newspaper The Japan Times noted that the track, along with "Kakuiumono," featured "tense riffing and propulsive rhythms," identifying them as the strongest songs on the album.

Commercially, the album World Is Yours peaked at number 44 on the weekly Oricon Albums Chart. The album spent a total of four weeks on the chart.

The song gained more attention on social media platforms such as TikTok, as a "sleeper hit".
