= Capital Press Club =

The Capital Press Club was founded in 1944 by Alfred Edgar Smith as an African-American alternative to the US National Press Club, which did not then accept black members.

== History ==
Past presidents include Wallace Terry (1962-1965). Founding members included Alfred E. Smith of the Chicago Daily Defender, J. Hugo Warren of the Pittsburgh Courier, Ralph Matthews Sr. of the Afro-American Newspapers, Joseph Sewall of the Washington Spotlight, Ric Roberts of the Pittsburgh Courier, St. Claire Bourne of the New York Amsterdam News, and Herbert Henegan of the U.S. Information Agency.

== Events ==
Events at the club have been broadcast on C-SPAN. In 2021 Waylan F. Amith spoke at the club.
