= William J. Trent =

American economist

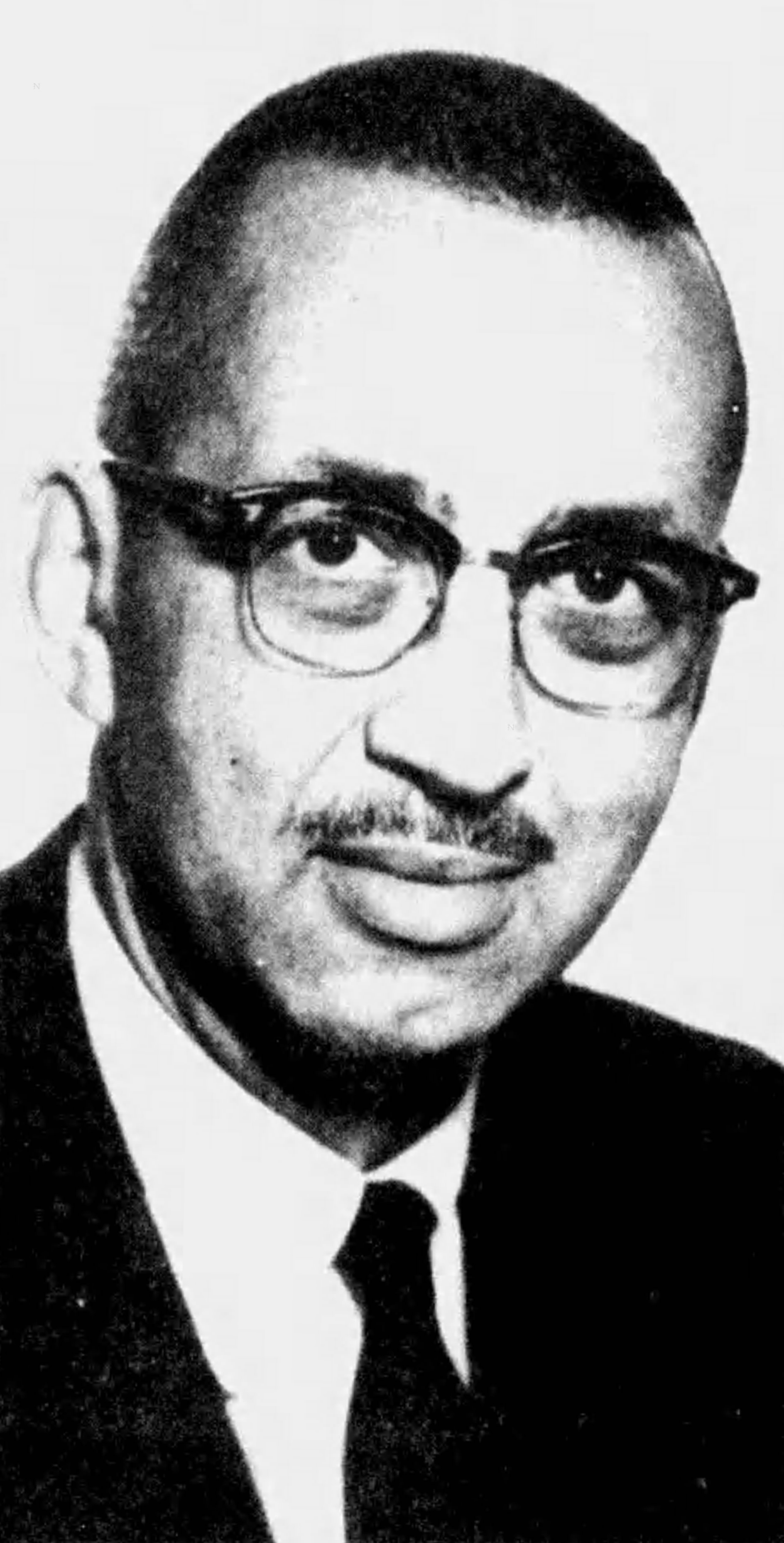
Trent c. 1964

William Johnson Trent Jr. (1910–1993) was an African-American economist, non-profit director and civil rights activist from North Carolina.

== Career ==
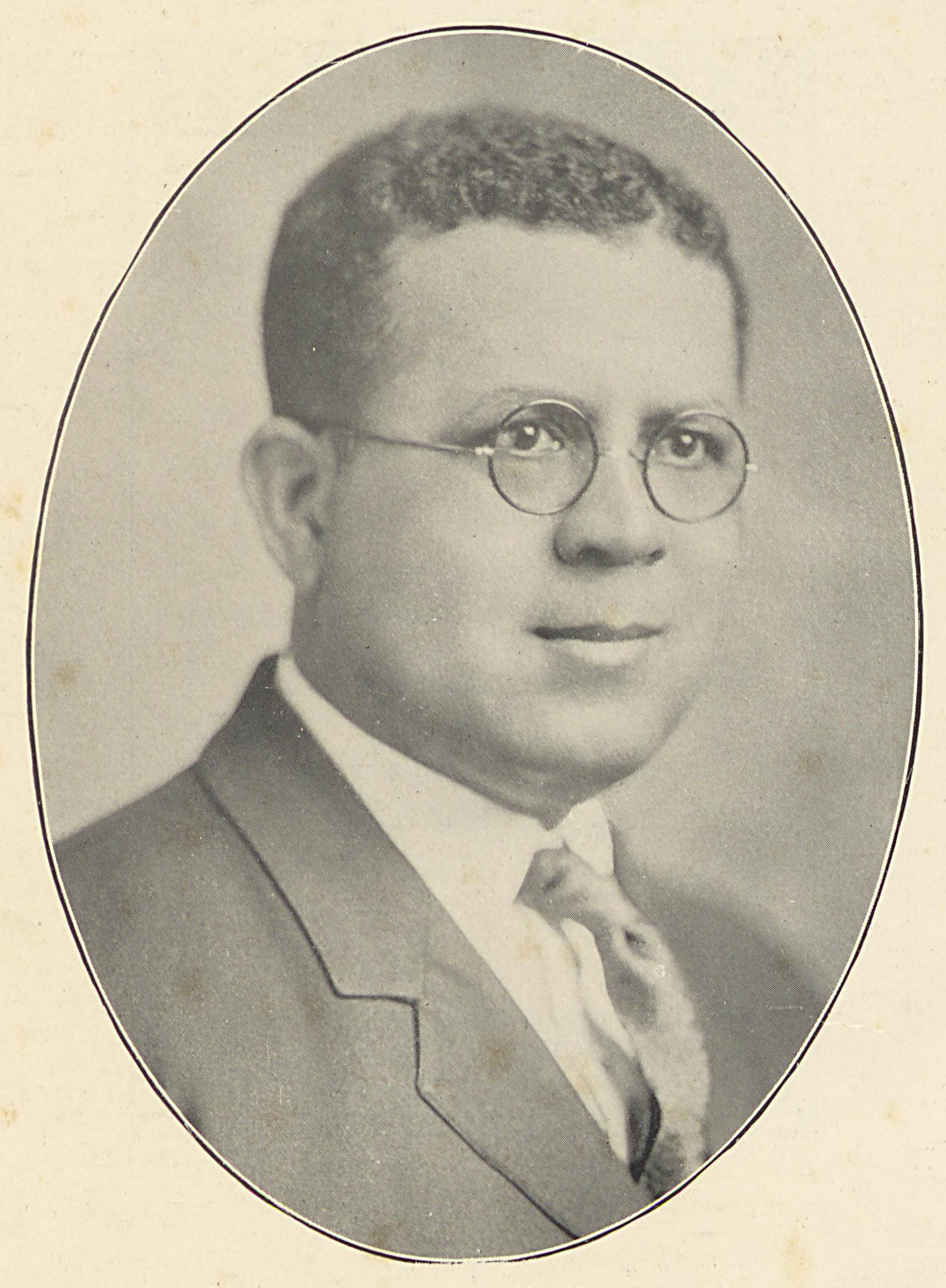
Trent's father in the Livingstone College yearbook, 1927

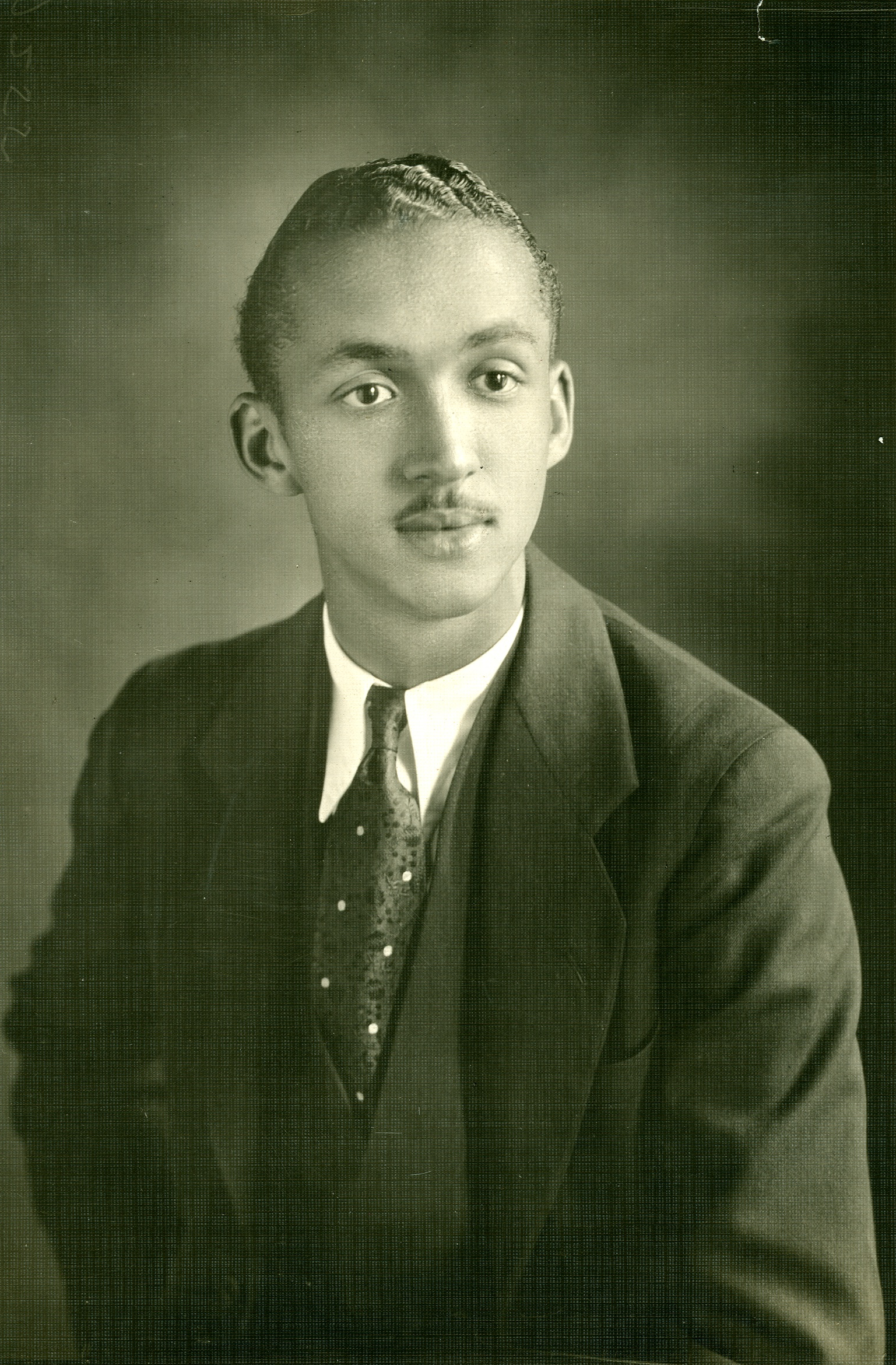
Trent in the Livingstone College yearbook, 1930

Trent was born in Asheville, North Carolina and moved with his family to Atlanta at an early age. His father, William J. Trent Sr., was an early organizer of the National Association for the Advancement of Colored People (NAACP). He graduated from a black private high school in Atlanta and attended Livingstone College, from which he graduated with a bachelor's degree in 1930. His father was president of Livingstone at the time. He then earned a master's degree in economics from the Wharton School of the University of Pennsylvania at the University of Pennsylvania and did graduate work at the University of Chicago. He then returned to North Carolina and taught for two years at his alma mater and later Bennett College.

Trent was part of U.S. President Franklin Delano Roosevelt's Black Cabinet, serving as Adviser on Negro Affairs to the Secretary of the Interior Harold L. Ickes and later in the position of race relations officer in the Federal Works Agency. He served as the executive director of the United Negro College Fund from its inception in 1944 until 1964. After leaving UNCF, Trent worked for Time Inc. as assistant personnel director where he was concerned with race relations. He retired in 1975 and returned to Greensboro, North Carolina, where he died of cardiac arrest at Moses H. Cone Memorial Hospital in November 1993.

He served as treasurer and longtime board member of the National Urban League and as board president of St. Luke's Hospital.

During his time at the United Negro College Fund, Trent raised $78 million for private historically black colleges and universities (HBCU).

=== UNCF ===
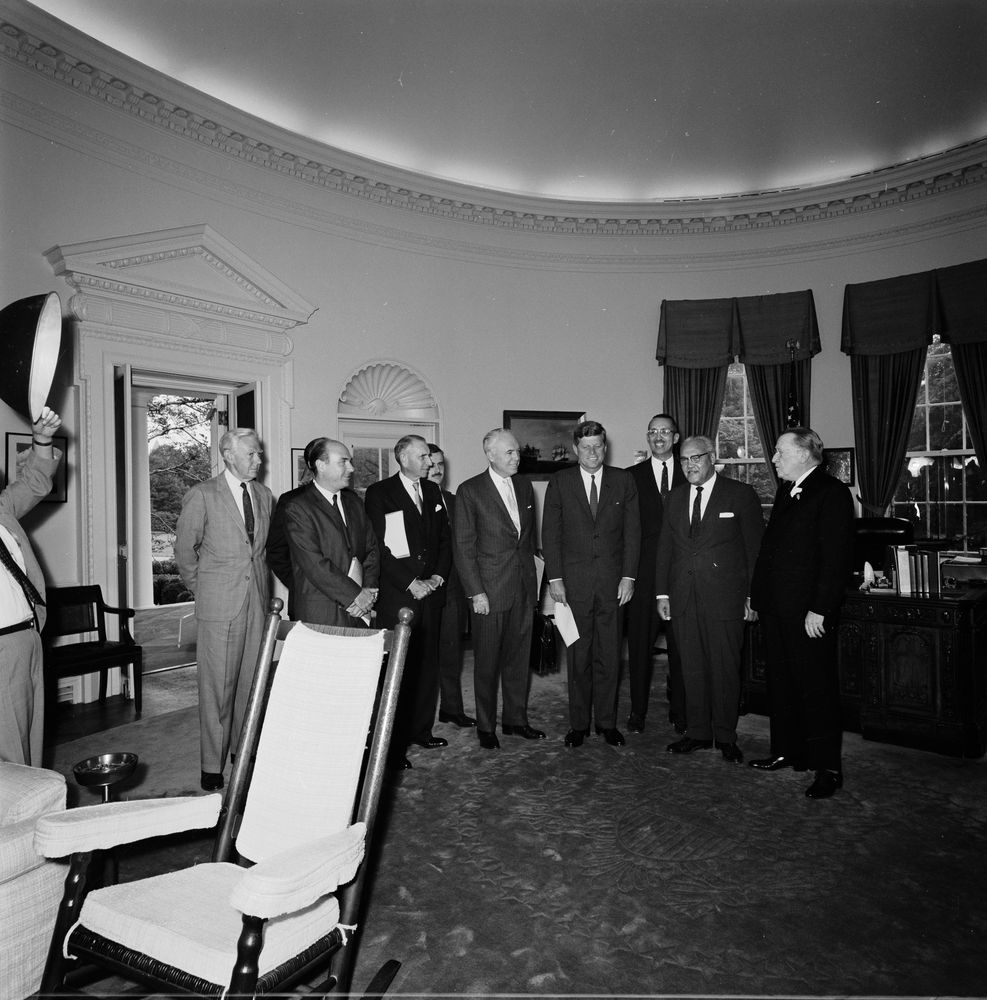
Trent (third from right) and other members of the United Negro College Fund meet with President John F. Kennedy in the Oval Office, September 25, 1962

Wharton Magazine referred to William J. Trent Jr. as the architect of the UNCF having steered the organization during the chaotic civil rights period in the United States. Trent collaborated with Frederick D. Patterson, Tuskegee Institute president and Mary McLeod Bethune in founding the nonprofit that brought together several college presidents in raising finances as a group with the motto of "Appeal to the National Conscience." This collective fund was made available to eligible white and black students regardless of race in 1956.USA presidents like Roosevelt and John F Kennedy as well as business moguls supported Trent in this endeavor. As a young student, President George Bush engaged Trent as campus coordinator for Yale University.
