= Andy Ho =

Singapore-born actor (1913–1992)

- Born: Andrew Chin Guan Ho; 2 July 1913; Singapore
- Died: 16 January 1992 (aged 78); London, England
- Occupation: Actor

Andy Ho (born Andrew Chin Guan Ho; 2 July 1913 – 16 January 1992) was a Singapore-born (then part of British Malaya) film and television actor who worked in London and Hollywood from the 1950s through to the 1980s.

== Biography ==
Andy Ho was born in Singapore in 1913. Later on, he moved to England, where he pursued a career as an actor. He made his theatrical debut in a production of The Vessel of Wrath in London in 1937. During the 1950s and 1960s, while working as an actor, he also owned a restaurant in London.

In 1970 Ho was cast as Fu Peng in the Doctor Who serial The Mind of Evil, but his performance so dissatisfied the director, Timothy Combe, that he was replaced in the role by his own agent, Kristopher Kum. Several scenes featuring Ho had to be discarded.

He and his wife had four children.

== Partial filmography ==
- Outpost in Malaya (1952) - Wan Li
- Laughing Anne (1953) - Chinese Merchant
- Up to His Neck (1954) - Salamander Manager (uncredited)
- The Beachcomber (1954) - Dispenser (uncredited)
- Out of the Clouds (1955) - Chinese Man (uncredited)
- A Touch of the Sun (1956) - Hu (uncredited)
- Zarak (1956) - Lee Feng (uncredited)
- Yangtse Incident: The Story of H.M.S. Amethyst (1957) - Chinese Nationalist Medical Officer
- Manuela (1957) - Cook
- Miracle in Soho (1957) - Chinaman (uncredited)
- Lady of Vengeance (1957) - Houseman
- The Naked Truth (1957) - Chinese Man in Pub (uncredited)
- The Mark of the Hawk (1957) - Chinese Officer
- The Savage Innocents (1960) - Anarvik
- The World of Suzie Wong (1960) - Ah Tong
- Swiss Family Robinson (1960) - Auban - Pirate
- The Long and the Short and the Tall (1961) - Japanese Soldier (uncredited)
- The Terror of the Tongs (1961) - Lee Chung (uncredited)
- Satan Never Sleeps (1962) - Ho San's Father
- 55 Days at Peking (1963) - (uncredited)
- Ferry Cross the Mersey (1964) - Chinese Restaurant Manager
- Kiss the Girls and Make Them Die (1966) - Ling
- You Only Live Twice (1967) - Gunman in Car (uncredited)
- Matchless (1967) - O-Chin
- The Last Grenade (1970) - Walter (uncredited)
- S*P*Y*S (1974) - Toy Ling (uncredited)
- Rollerball (1975) - Reporter (uncredited)
- An Almost Perfect Affair (1979) - Chinese tycoon
