= The Witness (TV series) =

American TV Series

- Created by: Irve Tunick
- No. of seasons: One
- No. of episodes: 17 episodes

Production
- Executive producer: David Susskind
- Producers: Murray Susskind, Nick Mayo
- Production locations: CBS Studios; NY, NY
- Running time: 60 minutes
- Production company: Talent Associates

Original release
- Network: CBS
- Release: September 29, 1960 – January 26, 1961

The Witness is an American television show broadcast on the CBS network in the United States from September 29, 1960 to January 26, 1961, in which a fictional "Committee" of lawyers cross-examined actors portraying actual people from the recent past of the United States who had been considered criminal or suspicious.

== Production ==
David Susskind was the executive producer, Murray Susskind (David's brother) and Nick Mayo were line producers, and the production company was Talent Associates. The show was created and written by Irve Tunick, and filmed in the CBS studios in New York City.

== Scheduling ==
The show initially was on Thursdays in the 7:30–8:30 PM (EST) timeslot; in December 1960 it was moved to the 9 PM E. T. slot on Thursdays. Seventeen episodes were produced and broadcast. The pilot episode was never aired. A planned eighteenth episode (on Huey Long) may also have never aired.

== Background ==
The premise of the show was explained in the opening narration:

"This show is not a trial, not a court of law, not a legislative inquiry, but a simulated hearing before a simulated committee representing the morality and the conscience of today, with the power to call before it the famous, the infamous, the evil and controversial figures of yesterday."

== Regular Cast ==
Verne Collett played the Court Reporter.

William Griffis played the Court Clerk.

The Committee Members were played by members of the New York Bar — not all of them appeared together in every episode:

- Paul McGrath
- William Smithers
- Frank Milan
- Charles Haydon
- Richard Steel
- William Geoghan Jr.
- Benedict Ginsberg

== Episodes/stars/air dates ==
- Pilot episode: "Arnold Rothstein" starring Telly Savalas (never aired)

Arnold "The Brain" Rothstein (1882–1928) was a New York kingpin of organized crime, widely reputed to have been behind baseball's Black Sox Scandal, in which the 1919 World Series was "fixed" to benefit certain gamblers.

- Episode 1.1: "Lucky Luciano" starring Telly Savalas (series premiere on September 29, 1960)

Charles "Lucky" Luciano (1897–1962) was a Sicilian-born American mobster, considered the father of modern organized crime in America. Telly Savalas' portrayal of him in this episode was considered "superb".

- Episode 1.2: "Jimmy Walker" starring Murray Hamilton (October 6, 1960)

Jimmy Walker (1881-1946) was a popular mayor of New York City, 1926-1932, during the Jazz Age; because of a corruption scandal, he was forced to resign.

- Episode 1.3: ? (October 20, 1960)
- Episode 1.4: ? (October 27, 1960)
- Episode 1.5: Roger 'The Terrible' Touhy starring Telly Savalas (November 3, 1960)

Roger Touhy (1898–1959), a Prohibition-era bootlegger and a Chicago rival of Al Capone, died a year before this broadcast, gunned down by unknown assailants twenty-two days after his release from prison where he had spent most of his adult life.

- Episode 1.6: "Police Lt. Charles Becker" starring Nehemiah Persoff (November 10, 1960)

Charles Becker (1870–1915) was a corrupt New York City police lieutenant who had been tried, convicted, and electrocuted in 1915 for the murder of Herman Rosenthal. Rosenthal was an underworld bookmaker and part-time gambler who had been forced to make Becker a partner in his gambling operation. Rosenthal was killed when he threatened to reveal Becker's role as an underworld figure.

- Episode 1.7: Louis ‘Lepke’ Buchalter , the Jewish mobster, starring Sam Levene (November 17, 1960)
- Episode 1.8: Jimmy Hines starring Albert Dekker (November 24, 1960)

James Joseph Hines (1876–1957) was one of the most powerful leaders of the Tammany Hall political operation in New York City. He was accused of being involved in a "policy" racket with Dutch Schultz and Dixie Davis in 1938, was tried, convicted, and sent to prison in 1939, and paroled 1944.

- Episode 1.9: Al Capone (December 1, 1960)

Al Capone (1899–1947) was an American gangster involved in smuggling, bootlegging, and other illegal activities during the 1920s and 1930s.

- Episode 1.10: ? (December 8, 1960)
- Episode 1.11: ? (December 15, 1960
- Episode 1.12 Kid Twist starring Peter Falk (December 22, 1960)

The film "Murder, Inc." had been released the previous summer (June 28, 1960, and had starred Peter Falk in this same role of gangster Abe Reles.

- Episode 1.13: ? (December 29, 1960)
- Episode 1.14: ? (January 5, 1961)
- Episode 1.15: Ma Barker starring Joan Blondell (January 12, 1961)

Ma Barker (1873–1935) was an American criminal of the 1930s, best known for taking motherly care of her adult gangster children.
Background on casting for "Ma Barker" episode
From a 1961 interview with Joan Blondell:

I think Ma Barker is interesting. She was very plain, dressed severely, deplored swearing, and quoted the Bible. She must have been mad.

From a 1964 interview with Joan Blondell:

That part got even for all the sweetness and light I've portrayed for years. She was the most vicious woman alive. I chewed that role up—even scared the camera crew.

- Episode 1.16 Dillinger starring Warren Stevens (January 19, 1961)

John Dillinger (1903–1934) was an American bank robber in the Midwest during the early 1930s.

- Episode 1.17 Shoeless Joe starring Biff McGuire (January 26, 1961)

"Shoeless Joe Jackson" was a baseball player implicated in the Black Sox Scandal of 1919, in which World Series players were paid off by gamblers to lose games.
Background on Shoeless Joe episode (from a 2004 interview with Biff McGuire):

What was most interesting to learn, was that Biff said that the actors in Witness used no script. This was live TV, too! He recalled being given material to read to prepare for his role -- and he still had what he was given: Warren Brown's history from the 1952 Putnam series, The Chicago White Sox. Biff wound up playing Shoeless as "caught up in things ... ashamed of what he did ... and very underpaid." Biff also recalled that his portrayal of Jackson won him the sympathy of the people working on the production: "Everyone on the crew was on my side."

Episodes with unknown airdates:
- Dutch Schultz was a Jewish-American gangster of German ancestry during the 1920s and 1930s in New York City.
- Bugsy Siegel was a Jewish-American gangster of Russian ancestry who was involved with Italian-American organized crime and the large-scale development of Las Vegas.
- Huey Long (scheduled for February 2, 1961, but may have never aired was the 40th Governor of Louisiana (1928-1932), and a U.S. senator 1932-1935 — noted for his radical populist policies, he was shot to death in the Louisiana State Capitol building in 1935.

== Critical reception ==
When the show first came on the air, TIME magazine said:

The Witness (CBS) is one of the more exciting shows to appear on TV in a long time. Packaged by David Susskind, it effectively utilizes a formula first laid out by more modest shows like Day in Court and The Verdict Is Yours: the simulated hearing or trial. The first episode grilled a fictional "Lucky" Luciano. While the case did not unfold too coherently, and the crowd noises in the simulated hearing room were badly overdone, the program spectacularly captured the disorderly drama of committee hearings, with all their rambling language and flashing anger. Telly Savalas, a comparatively unknown actor, was superb as Luciano—full of gutter cynicism, arrogance, brutality, and yet at moments pathetic. The show's spontaneity derived partly from the fact that the lawyers involved were real, some of the best courtroom performers in New York (Richard Steel William Geoghan Jr., Charles Haydon,' Benedict Ginsberg), who ad-libbed much of their argument.

However, several months later, daily newspaper television columns disagreed—for example:

Despite medical care and extensive surgery, CBS' "The Witness" series will succumb after the Feb. 2 show. The end, when it comes, is the result of faulty ratings which even a change of climate—from an earlier to a later slot in the Thursday night schedule—failed to improve.
