= Lady of Vengeance =

1957 film by Burt Balaban

- Original British quad poster
- Directed by: Burt Balaban
- Written by: Irve Tunick
- Produced by: Burt Balaban; Bernard Donnenfeld
- Starring: Dennis O'Keefe; Ann Sears; Anton Diffring; Patrick Barr
- Cinematography: Ian D. Struthers (as Ian Struthers)
- Edited by: Eric Boyd-Perkins
- Music by: Phil Cardew
- Production companies: Princess Production Corporation; Rich & Rich Ltd.
- Distributed by: United Artists
- Release dates: August 1957 (United Kingdom); August 1957 (United States)
- Running time: 74 minutes
- Country: United Kingdom
- Language: English

Lady of Vengeance is a 1957 British second feature ('B') film noir crime film directed by Burt Balaban and starring Dennis O'Keefe, Ann Sears, Anton Diffring and Patrick Barr. It was written by Irve Tunick.

== Plot ==
When 21-year-old Melissa Collinsv commits suicide, her guardian, the domineering American newspaper publisher William T. Marshall, searches (in flashback) for a reason. He finds it in a letter he receives from Melissa, after her death. In this, she asks Marshall to take revenge on her lover, philandering musician Larry Shaw, who caused her such pain he made life not worth living. Marshall hires criminal mastermind, Karnak, an avid philatelist. He promises him a rare stamp in exchange for planning the torturous murder of Larry Shaw. Meanwhile, Marshall's loyal secretary, Katie Whiteside, attempts to calm her boss's obsessive desires for vengeance. Matters become additionally complicated however, when Karnak targets the wrong man.

== Cast ==
- Dennis O'Keefe as William T. Marshal
- Ann Sears as Katie Whiteside
- Anton Diffring as Emile Karnak
- Patrick Barr as Inspector Madden
- Vernon Greeves as Larry Shaw
- Eileen Elton as Melissa Collins
- Frederick Schiller as Schleigel
- Jacqueline Curtis as Penny
- G. H. Mulcaster as Bennett
- Gerald Case as Hawley
- Jack McNaughton as Coroner
- Colin Croft as bartender
- Andy Ho as houseman
- Humphrey Morton as Corbey

== Critical reception ==
The Monthly Film Bulletin wrote: "It is difficult to summon up much enthusiasm for this sorry effort, apart from a certain sense of wonder at the impossibility of its plot, its collection of dangling loose-ends and the sheer effrontery of its red-herring. The playing, understandably in view of the script, is somewhat dismal."

Kine Weekly wrote: "The picture does not fly high, but nevertheless steadily grips. Dennis O'Keefe thoroughly convinces as the determined Marshall, Anton Diffring completely disarms as the doubledealing Karnak, Patrick Barr, although little more than a passenger, registers as Madden, Ann Sears pleases as Katie, and Vernon Greeves proves an effective red herring as Shaw. Moreover, the car-crash climax is in the best thriller tradition. No waste of footage here."

Variety wrote: "Burdened with a contrived and confusing plot, import carries small appeal for American audiences. Even for the less discriminating program situations it's a dull entry, ponderously and often amateurishly produced and of a genre that went out many years ago on screen."

Dennis Schwartz called the film a "tedious noir crime drama about the insanity of revenge."

Leonard Maltin also described the film as "tedious."

TV Guide noted, "the plot is very confusing, making it hard to follow this picture. Slack direction does little to help."

In The British 'B' Film Chibnall and McFarlane called the film a "rambling revenge thriller."
