= High Hell (film) =

1958 film by Burt Balaban

- Directed by: Burt Balaban
- Screenplay by: Irve Tunick
- Based on: High Cage by Steve Frazee
- Produced by: Burt Balaban; Arthur Mayer
- Starring: John Derek; Elaine Stewart
- Cinematography: James Wilson
- Edited by: Eric Boyd-Perkins
- Music by: Phil Cardew
- Distributed by: Paramount Pictures
- Release date: January 1958
- Running time: 87 minutes
- Countries: United States; United Kingdom
- Language: English
- Budget: $350,000

High Hell is a 1958 American film set in the Canadian Rockies. It was a British B-movie intended for North American audiences, with exteriors filmed in the Swiss Jungfrau and interiors on a British sound stage.

== Plot ==
Craig Rhodes and Frank Davidson are partners in a gold mine in Canada. Frank's wife Lenore falls for Craig and is lusted after by Luke Fulgham.

== Cast ==
- John Derek as Craig Rhodes
- Elaine Stewart as Lenore Davidson
- Patrick Allen as Luke Fulgham
- Jerold Wells as Charlie Spence
- Al Mulock as Frank Davidson
- Rodney Burke as Danny Rhodes
- Colin Croft as Malvern
- Nicholas Stuart as Jed
- Dick James as Singer (voice)
