= Alfred Edgar Smith =

American journalist and civil rights leader (1903–1986)

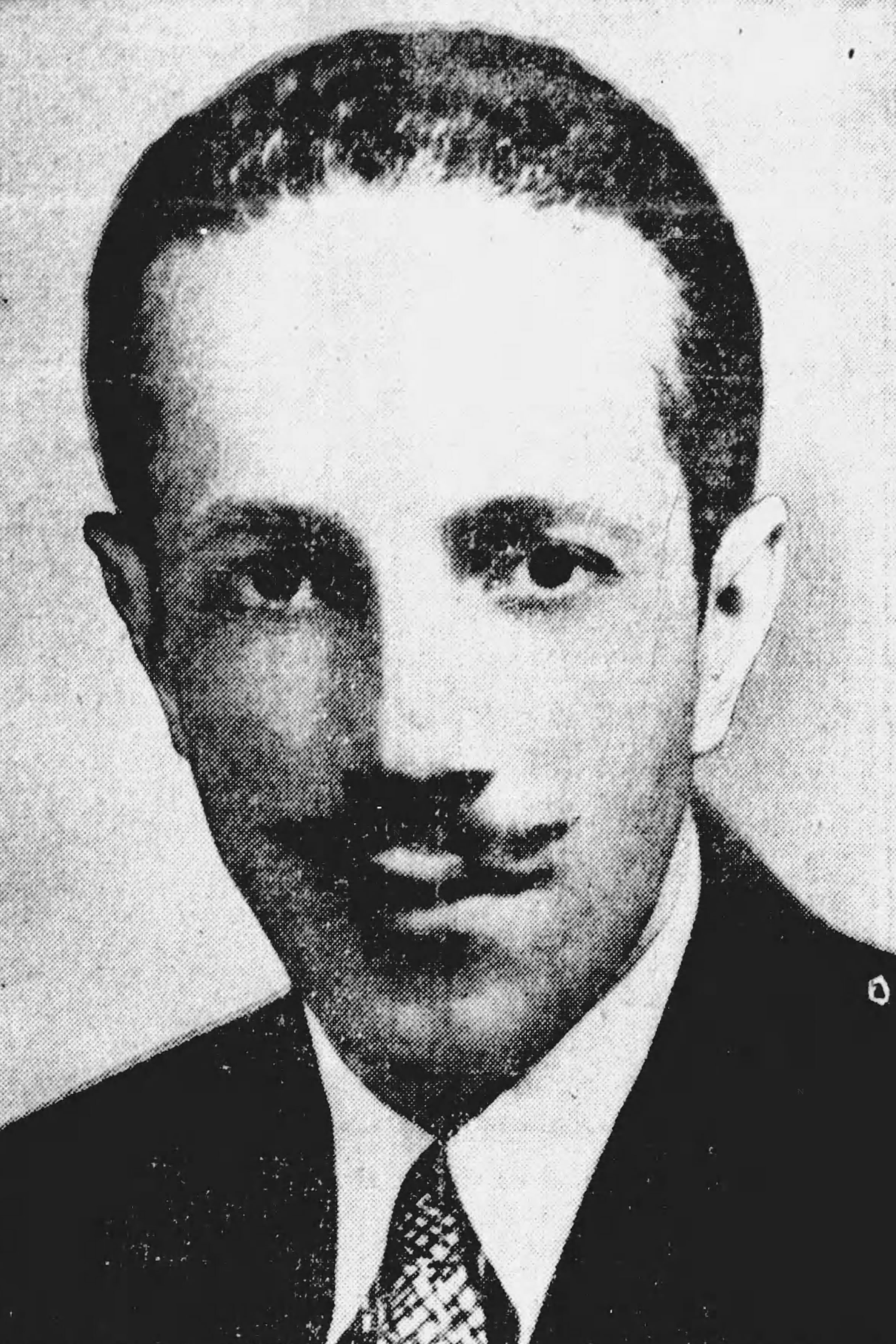
Smith c. 1938

Alfred Edgar Smith (December 2, 1903 – May 26, 1986) was a journalist and civil rights leader who founded the Capital Press Club, a professional organization for Black journalists. He served in several New Deal agencies and came to be known as Harry Hopkins's "right hand man."

== Biography ==
Smith was born in Hot Springs, Arkansas on December 2, 1903, to Jesse Rufus and Mamie Johnson Smith, and his father was born in slavery. It was during Smith's time at Howard University, which he entered in 1920 and from which he earned BA and MA degrees, that Smith became aware of and began advocating for West Indians who were discriminated against. W.E.B. Du Bois, then the editor of Crisis Magazine encouraged Smith to write an essay about their treatment, and the article was published in Opportunity, a magazine published by the Urban League in 1933.

Following graduation, Smith worked at both the Federal Emergency Relief Administration and Works Progress Administration and later served on President Franklin Delano Roosevelt's unofficial Federal Council of Negro Affairs (the "Black Cabinet") where he addressed issues of Black unemployment. Later in his career, Smith was a columnist and bureau chief for the Chicago Defender where he continued to cover Howard University. He also wrote for Negro Digest and Ebony.

Smith married the former Lula Jackson in 1942. Smith died on May 26, 1986, at George Washington University Hospital and is buried in Rock Creek Cemetery.
