= East Side West Side (TV series) =

- Genre: Drama
- Created by: David Susskind
- Written by: Edward Adler; Robert Alan Aurthur; George Bellak; Robert J. Crean; Edward DeBlasio; Millard Lampell; M.L. Paterson; Arnold Perl; Robert van Scoyk; Allen E. Sloane; Irve Tunick
- Directed by: John Berry; Marc Daniels; Herschel Daugherty; Tom Gries; Alex March; Daniel Petrie; Allen Reisner; Ralph Senensky; Jack Smight; Ron Winston
- Starring: George C. Scott; Elizabeth Wilson; Cicely Tyson; Linden Chiles
- Theme music composer: Kenyon Hopkins
- Composer: Kenyon Hopkins
- Country of origin: United States
- Original language: English
- No. of seasons: 1
- No. of episodes: 26

Production
- Executive producers: David Susskind; Arnold Perl; Daniel Melnick
- Producers: Don Kranze; Larry Arrick
- Cinematography: John S. Priestley
- Editor: Sidney Meyers
- Running time: 45–48 minutes
- Production companies: Talent Associates; United Artists Television

Original release
- Network: CBS
- Release: September 23, 1963 – April 27, 1964

East Side/West Side is an American drama series starring George C. Scott, Elizabeth Wilson, Cicely Tyson, and, later on, Linden Chiles. The series aired for one season (1963–1964), and was shown Monday nights on CBS.

Set in New York City, the show explored issues of urban life, some of them grim. Though it won critical praise, it also generated some controversy. TV Guide ranked it #6 on their 2013 list of 60 shows that were "Cancelled Too Soon".

== Synopsis ==
The series centers on Neil Brock (Scott), a New York City social worker who works for the private agency Community Welfare Service, with his secretary, Jane Foster, (Tyson). (Diana Sands played this character in the pilot, which was broadcast as the 17th episode of the show. Sands played a different role in episode 7, for which she received an Emmy nomination.) Tyson was the first African-American actor to star in a regular role in a television drama. Brock's superior at the agency is Frieda "Hecky" Hechlinger (Wilson).

Episodes of East Side/West Side addressed topics relevant to the inner city, with many controversial issues explored. A typical example came in the first two episodes, when Brock investigated a prostitute and her child ("The Sinner"), followed by a story involving statutory rape (“Age of Consent”).

Brock often felt stymied, and angered, by the inadequacy of the resources he had to work with, and the vast number of people with problems he wasn't able to solve. In an effort to treat the root causes of social ills on a wider scale (but also to alter the tone of the show, which was seen as relentlessly downbeat) 22 episodes into the series Brock resigned from his job ("Take Sides with the Sun") to work for progressive (but pragmatic) New York state congressman Charles W. Hanson (Linden Chiles), who had been seen in a couple of earlier episodes. Now instead of being a social worker, Brock was essentially a congressional consultant with a roving brief—he could investigate specific cases of societal injustice, or take on the system as a whole, depending on the situation. The producers (and network) hoped that while East Side/West Side could still be a show that wrestled with important issues, Brock's new position would allow for stories that could feature more optimistic endings.

Added to the cast at this juncture were Hanson's staffers Mike Miller (John McMartin) and Bowen Munro (Henderson Forsythe). The characters played by Elizabeth Wilson and Cicely Tyson quickly disappeared, coming back for just one further appearance. Barbara Feldon was given a one-shot trial episode as Brock's girlfriend Joanna, and Jessica Walter was similarly tried out for one episode as Hanson's secretary Peggy Dowling, but both characters were thereafter dropped with no onscreen explanation.

East Side/West Side received eight Emmy nominations and much critical praise, but only mediocre ratings and little support from the CBS brass, who saw it as a show whose perceived prestige didn't translate into commercial success. Despite the high quality of both the writing and acting, the show's tendency to address sensitive topics meant that many potential advertisers avoided sponsorship of the show. Also, a number of television stations affiliated with CBS across the country chose not to air the program for their local viewers—sometimes because of the views expressed by the show, but also, particularly in the US south, because Tyson's character was treated as an equal to the show's white characters, which raised the ire of Southern segregationalists. It was reported that CBS programming chief James Aubrey clashed with Scott over the direction of East Side/West Side, also a factor in its cancellation.

The December 23, 1963 episode, "Creeps Live Here," was originally scheduled to be broadcast on November 25, but was postponed as CBS concluded their four-day live coverage of the John F. Kennedy assassination.

East Side/West Side ran on Monday evenings at 10 PM, opposite ABC's medical drama about psychiatry, Breaking Point and NBC's Sing Along with Mitch starring Mitch Miller. The show's executive producer, David Susskind, began a letter-writing campaign to government officials, newspaper editors, and other prominent individuals to gain support for renewal of the series. However, the effort failed when the show was cancelled on January 28 (although it was allowed to finish out the season, airing its final episode on April 27).

== Cast ==
- George C. Scott as Neil Brock
- Cicely Tyson as Jane Foster (Episodes 1–16, 18-22, 24)
  - Diana Sands plays Jane Foster in episode 17, which was actually filmed as the pilot
- Elizabeth Wilson as Frieda Hechlinger (Episodes 1–22, 24)
- Linden Chiles as Congressman Charles Hanson (Episodes 19–26)
- John McMartin as Mike Miller (Episodes 22–26)
- Henderson Forsythe as Bowen Munro (Episodes 22–26)

== Conception and development ==
East Side/West Side started as a vehicle for George C. Scott, who had recently gained prominence after acclaimed theatrical performances and a series of important films. On January 3, 1962, CBS and United Artists announced that they were beginning preparations for an hour-long drama starring Scott, to be launched during the 1963-1964 season.

Scott did not like the idea of the show being prepared for him and threatened to abrogate his agreement with CBS. The president of CBS, James Aubrey, introduced Scott to an independent producer David Susskind, who turned to his friend Robert Alan Aurthur, a talented television playwright, for a screenplay conception. Aurthur offered an unproduced script, My Three Angels, centered around a trio of inner-city social workers, and rewrote the script to fit Scott. Aurthur renamed the project East Side/West Side, a reference to the two halves of upper Manhattan as bisected by Central Park. The main protagonist was Neil Brock, to be played by Scott — a tough, impatient, temperamental case worker. With the approval of Aubrey and his newest television star, David Susskind began production on Aurthur’s pilot script, a story about a teen gang killer and his path through the legal system, now called "It’s War, Man".

The central location of the series was the Community Welfare Service (CWS), a private agency that served as home base for three social workers dedicated to solving the daily problems, major and minor, of the residents of an impoverished Manhattan neighborhood. According to George C. Scott, the setting was chosen deliberately to get his character out of the office and maximize the audience’s exposure to the real streets of New York.

In November 1962, Susskind attended a meeting of the New York City Social Work Recruiting Committee and announced his plans to create a television series focusing on the social work profession. He and his staff were provided with appropriate literature from the Committee, which they used to discuss story ideas and scripts. In January 1963, Bertram Beck, Executive Director of the National Association of Social Workers (NASW), informed his organization of Susskind's interest in producing a show about social workers and requested that his subordinates send story ideas to the producer. Beck served as consultant and technical adviser for the series, reading the scripts, making editorial comments and changes, and handling much of the mail from social workers who wrote to NASW about the series.

"It's War, Man" resembled an episode of the contemporary courtroom procedural series The Defenders and gave little indication of the shocking, socially conscious show that East Side/West Side would become.

== Social context ==
During the 1950s, the Eisenhower Administration accepted the doctrine that "economic growth would itself, by diffusing prosperity, reduce inequalities and resolve social problems. The progressive tax structure, expanded welfare services, mass public education, and the G.I. Bill all served the twin aims of economic growth and income redistribution". However, by the mid 50s, some disputed whether economic growth alone was distributing such benefits as expected.

In 1962, Michael Harrington, in The Other America, exposed the misery and deprivation of a "new" poor. This group, consisting of the sick, disabled, elderly, minorities of color, and members of female-headed families, had not, Harrington argued, benefited from post-World War prosperity. In January 1963, Dwight Macdonald provided an exhaustive summary of previous studies on poverty in an important article entitled "Our Invisible Poor" in The New Yorker magazine. He asserted that mass poverty persisted, and that it was one of two grave social problems, the other being the structural relationship of poverty to race. He concluded that the federal government was the only force that could reduce poverty and make the lives of the poor more bearable. Between 1961 and 1964, federal grants were provided to public and private community agencies to combat the problems of the "new poor" through the improvement of educational facilities, youth programs, and other programs to improve the physical and social well-being of the poor.

John F. Kennedy's 1960 presidential campaign increased the public's consciousness about poverty. Once elected, he established the President's Committee on Juvenile Delinquency and Youth Crime, which sponsored employment programs, manpower training, remedial education, anti-discrimination campaigns, and neighborhood development centers in several cities. The Area Redevelopment Act, passed in 1961, provided Federal dollars to improve public facilities, and to provide technical assistance and retraining in certain regions of the country, particularly Appalachia. In 1962, Congress also enacted the Manpower Development and Training Act. The reform efforts of the late 1950s and early 1960s culminated in the War on Poverty, initiated by the administration of Lyndon B. Johnson.

An episode of "East Side/West Side" on an African American couple in Harlem was blacked out by CBS affiliates in Shreveport, Louisiana, and Atlanta, Georgia, primarily for racial reasons.

== Episodes ==
Episode	Title	Directed by	Written by	Original release date	Produced
1	"The Sinner"	Jack Smight	Edward DeBlasio	September 23, 1963	2
A mother, who is also a prostitute, must battle the parents of her baby's father for custody.
2	"Age of Consent"	Ralph Senensky	Story by : David Michael-James; Teleplay by : Irve Tunick	September 30, 1963	7
A teenage romance goes awry when the girl's father (Carroll O'Connor) charges her boyfriend with statutory rape.
3	"You Can't Beat the System"	Jack Smight	Robert Van Scoyk	October 7, 1963	4
Brock offers a Korean War veteran suffering from post-traumatic stress disorder the opportunity to volunteer to work with the sick.
4	"Something for the Girls"	Richard Whorf	Edward DeBlasio	October 14, 1963	9
A wealthy socialite, guilty of numerous unpaid parking tickets, is "sentenced" to serve as a social worker for 30 days.
5	"I Before E Except After C"	Daniel Petrie	Story by : Ossie Davis; Teleplay by : Arnold Perl & Ossie Davis	October 21, 1963	8
A dedicated schoolteacher (Howard da Silva) is faced with the problem of delinquent students.
6	"No Wings at All"	Marc Daniels	Allen E. Sloane	October 28, 1963	11
A father (Theodore Bikel) must deal with the challenges and struggles of raising an adult son who is intellectually disabled.
7	"Who Do You Kill?"	Tom Gries	Arnold Perl	November 4, 1963	12
A black couple (James Earl Jones and Diana Sands) struggles to deal with life in the slums, but their world falls apart when tragedy strikes their baby.
8	"Go Fight City Hall"	Marc Daniels	William M. Alltmas	November 11, 1963	6
After being evicted from his apartment due to urban renewal, a man begins to lose his faith in the importance of the individual.
9	"Not Bad for Openers"	Nicholas Webster	Edward Adler	November 18, 1963	10
A cab driver (Norman Fell) with a gambling problem finds a wallet containing a large sum of money.
10	"No Hiding Place"	Herschel Daugherty	Story by : Millard Lampell & John Gabriel; Teleplay by : Millard Lampell	December 2, 1963	13
The issue of blockbusting is explored as a black couple finds suburban life difficult until they are befriended by their neighbors. Guest stars: Ruby Dee, Joseph Campanella.
11	"Where's Harry?"	Tom Gries	Stanley R. Greenberg	December 9, 1963	14
An emotionally disturbed suburbanite (Simon Oakland) abandons his family after 20 years of married life.
12	"My Child on Monday Morning"	Daniel Petrie	Robert J. Crean	December 16, 1963	5
Parents of a mentally disturbed child seek out Brock's assistance.
13	"Creeps Live Here"	Walter Grauman	Phillip Reisman, Jr.	December 23, 1963	3
Semi-recluse tenants are faced with the prospect of losing their home.
14	"The $5.98 Dress"	Ron Winston	William Altman	January 13, 1964	16
Brock rushes to the aid of a mother with four children who is abandoned by her irresponsible and erratic husband.
15	"The Beatnik and the Politician"	Allen Reisner	Robert Van Scoyk	January 20, 1964	17
A folk-singing beatnik (Alan Arkin) stirs up a storm with his odd friends in a sedate neighborhood.
16	"One Drink at a Time"	John Berry	Edward Adler	January 27, 1964	18
A Bowery resident (Maureen Stapleton) desperately tries to reform her derelict boyfriend.
17	"It's War, Man"	Daniel Petrie	Robert Alan Aurthur	February 10, 1964	1
Despite heated public opinion against him, Brock helps a teenage gang member accused of murder.
18	"Don't Grow Old"	Herschel Daugherty	Edward DeBlasio	February 17, 1964	15
An elderly construction worker who is forced out of his job by age discrimination, becomes frustrated by his inability to find a new job.
19	"The Street"	Ron Winston	Millard Lampell	February 24, 1964	19
After a teenage girl is abused by her mother's boyfriend, she runs away and tries to survive on the streets. Brock shares a career crisis with his girlfriend, portrayed by Barbara Feldon.
20	"If Your Grandmother Had Wheels"	Tom Gries	Allan E. Sloane	March 2, 1964	20
Brock attempts to help a wheelchair-using man concentrates all his energies on walking again. Guest star: Alex Cord as Sam
21	"The Passion of the Nickel Player"	Charles S. Dubin	Edward Adler	March 9, 1964	21
Brock comes into contact with a 12-year-old boy actively engaged in the numbers racket.
22	"Take Sides with the Sun"	Alex March	Allan E. Sloane	March 16, 1964	22
Brock receives an offer to work as a legislative aide to Congressman Charles Hanson and debates whether to leave his current position.
23	"The Name of the Game"	Charles S. Dubin	Mel Goldberg	March 23, 1964	23
A union leader (Daniel J. Travanti) and an industrialist battle each other in the negotiating of a new labor contract.
24	"Nothing But the Half Truth"	Alex March	Robert Van Scoyk	March 30, 1964	24
Brock considers quitting his new position with Congressman Hanson, when Hanson doesn't follow through on promises made by Brock on a television discussion show. David Susskind appears as the television host, along with Scott's real-life wife Colleen Dewhurst.
25	"The Givers"	Tom Gries	George Bellak	April 13, 1964	25
Brock and Hanson must battle pro-business lobbyists in their bid for legislation that would stiffen penalties for contracting fraud.
26	"Here Today"	John Berry	Story by : Allan E. Sloane & Matthew Andrews; Teleplay by : Allan E. Sloane	April 27, 1964	26
Brock writes a series of articles highlighting the plight of the poor, but is unable to get them published anywhere. He finally finds one paper that can do so, but the paper itself is about to be taken over, with its style of journalism certain to be neutered.

== Awards and nominations ==
In 1964, the series received eight Emmy Award nominations, including one win for Outstanding Directorial Achievement awarded to Tom Gries for the controversial November 4, 1963 episode entitled, "Who Do You Kill?". The episode, which also received a writing nomination and acting nominations for supporting actors James Earl Jones and Diana Sands, explored the aftermath of a child's death from a rat bite in a Harlem slum.

== Music ==
Soundtrack album released in 1963

A selection of Kenyon Hopkins' music for the series was released on the Columbia label in 1963.

Sony rereleased the album on CD in 2015, and it is now also available on streaming platforms.

=== Track listing ===
A Side
No.	Title	Length
1.	"East Side / West Side"	1:43
2.	"Holland Tunnel"	2:39
3.	"Central Park West"	1:32
4.	"Stick Ball"	1:36
5.	"Neil's Night Out"	3:21
6.	"Traffic Jam"	1:28
7.	"Sutton Lights"	2:18
8.	"Theme From "Who Do You Kill""	2:05

B Side
No.	Title	Length
1.	"Sweet Juke"	2:23
2.	"Triboro Drive"	2:02
3.	"Blue Harlem"	1:18
4.	"Times Square"	2:25
5.	"Layna's Theme"	2:38
6.	"The Recluse"	2:05
7.	"Society Girl"	2:29
8.	"Midnight Walk"	1:15
Total length:		33:49
