= Lawrence A. Oxley =

American civil rights activist (1887–1973)

Lawrence A. Oxley (1887–1973) was one among 45 prominent black community leaders appointed by President Franklin D. Roosevelt to what was called his Black Cabinet, positions in numerous executive agencies and to serve as advisers during his administration. He served with the federal government until 1957. As the Director of the Division of Work among Negroes (1925–1934) in North Carolina, the first state office of its kind, he created programs which other states used as models.

== Early life and education ==
Lawrence A. Oxley was born in 1887 in Massachusetts and attended public schools in Boston and Cambridge, also studying at Harvard. He served with the US Army during World War I, earning the rank of lieutenant.

== Career ==
After working in field community service positions in Ohio, West Virginia and other states, in 1925, Oxley was appointed in North Carolina as Director of the new Division of Work Among Negroes, a branch of the State Board of Charities and Public Welfare. The division was "the first of its kind in the nation" and due to Oxely's success in developing programs, it became a model for other states.

Oxley studied the lives and social conditions of African Americans; and developed self-help initiatives. He promoted social welfare programs that addressed issues of job readiness and social functioning. He emphasized the need to strengthen community efforts with funding and professionally trained social workers, a relatively new profession that developed in the late 19th and early 20th century. Oxley was a strong advocate for unemployment assistance, despite North Carolina's reluctance to extend such relief to the black community. In addition, he improved hospital care and prison reform, as well as encouraging the development of statewide services available to blacks in Appalachia, such as an orthopedic hospital.

During this period, Oxley also taught for a few years as an instructor at St. Augustine's College, a historically black college (HBCU) in the capital of Raleigh, North Carolina. Oxley used his affiliation with the Bishop Tuttle School of School Work to build collaboration between the college and the Division of Work. He supported the education of black social workers and helped them find positions in state and local governments. (Branch, 1992) By 1934, when Oxley left the state for federal service, African-American social workers were in public agencies in 40 counties.

In 1934, Oxley was appointed to the US Department of Labor, one of 45 prominent black community leaders selected by President Franklin D. Roosevelt's administration for positions in the federal government in Washington, DC. In addition to working on programs in their respective areas in executive agencies, the appointees served as unofficial advisers to the president on issues dealing New Deal programs and their impact on African-American communities during the Great Depression. Oxley worked on programs to improve employment opportunities for African Americans. In 1937, he published "Government Employment and Negro Youth", an article encouraging use of the U.S. Employment Services opportunities. By publishing in a widely read journal, Oxley used an existing network to distribute information about government programs.

Oxley continued to serve with the federal government until 1957, acting as an advocate for the elderly. His work was an example of combining scholarship and practice. While leading efforts in state and federal government to change approaches to welfare, he published articles and reports about issues in the black community. He was a pioneer in social work and state government's providing social welfare. He was considered "one of the most influential state welfare leaders of his time".

== Personal ==
He joined Omega Psi Phi, the first African-American fraternity founded at a historically black college. (It was founded at Howard University.) He was elected as its Grand Basileus (1932–1935).
