= Joseph R. Houchins =

American economist (1900–1990)

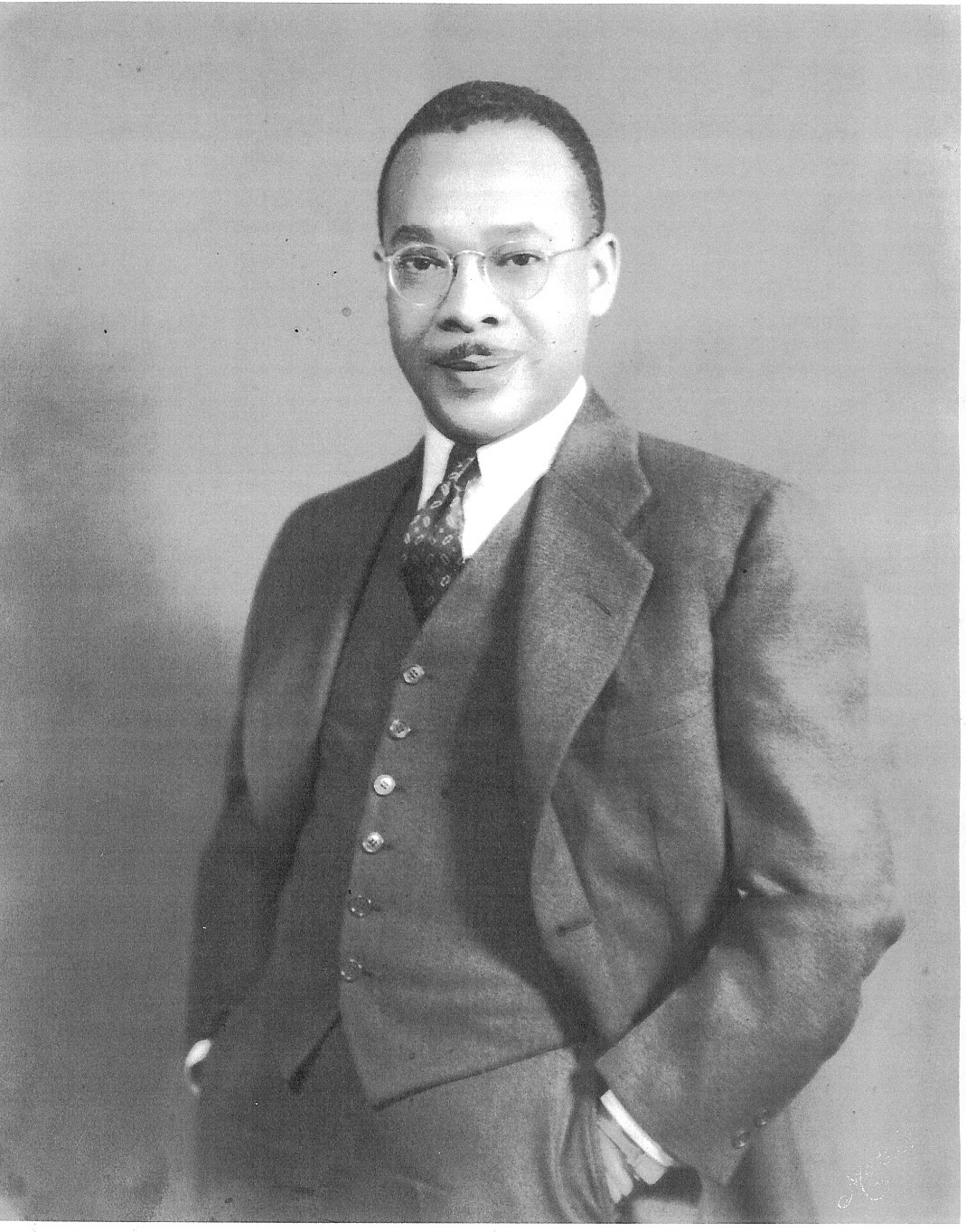

Personal details
- Born: Joseph Roosevelt Houchins; August 9, 1900 Richmond, Virginia, U.S.
- Died: January 5, 1990 (aged 89) Washington, D.C., U.S.
- Spouse: Frankie Lea Houchins
- Education: Cornell University (BA, MA, LLB, JSD)

Joseph Roosevelt Houchins (August 9, 1900 – January 5, 1990) was an American labor economist, attorney, and academic. He was a member of Franklin D. Roosevelt's Black Cabinet, a leader of the Division of Negro Affairs in the United States Department of Commerce, and a chair and professor of economics at Howard University.

== Background ==
Joseph Roosevelt Houchins was born on August 9, 1900, in Richmond, Virginia.

Houchins grew up in Ithaca, New York, and was fostered by his uncle. He attended the integrated Ithaca High School, where he excelled academically and participated in track and cross country, drama, and many other clubs. Houchins graduated in 1921. He began attending Cornell University the following year. He earned four degrees at Cornell, Bachelor of Arts in 1926, Bachelor of Laws in 1927, Master of Arts in 1930, and a Doctor of Juridical Science in 1934. In 1927, he began serving as a professor of Economics and Government at Wiley College in Marshall, Texas, and completed his degrees at Cornell during summer breaks.

== Career ==
=== Government ===
==== Commerce Department ====
In 1935, Houchins joined the Commerce Department's Division of Negro Affairs as Special Assistant to the Director. This agency advocated for Black business progress and produced many initiatives to analyze and promote Black business. Houchins authored two of the most important studies that laid the foundation for Black businesses' ongoing support during the subsequent decade. He became the interim Director of the Division of Negro Affairs in 1938 and remained in that position until 1940.

In 1940, Houchins began serving in the Census Bureau as head of Negro Statistics Section. At this post, he was paid less than his white counterparts. In 1952, his annual salary was 4.3% below the next lowest paid section leader and 23.1% below the highest-paid section leader in the Population and Housing Division.

In 1953, the Division of Negro Affairs was abolished by President Dwight D. Eisenhower as part of a reduction in what was deemed at the time, non-essential government units. However, the data generated by the Division helped many civil rights lawsuits.

In 1955, Houchins was appointed by Vice President Richard Nixon to President Eisenhower's Committee on Government Contract, the precursor to the Committee on Equal Employment Opportunity. In this position, he drew and his economics and legal training to support non-discriminatory access to government contract opportunities. By 1959, Houchins became Director of Compliance and, in 1960, initiated a high visibility probe of the denial of jobs to Black people at Ingalls Shipbuilding in Pascagoula, MS. He also called on Alabama Dry Dock and Shipbuilding in Mobile, AL, to end its discriminatory employment practices.

==== Black Cabinet ====
In 1935, Houchins became a member of the Franklin D. Roosevelt administration's Black Cabinet, also known as the Federal Council of Negro Affairs. Roosevelt appointed 45 prominent Black people to positions in executive agencies such as the Department of Commerce. They served as advisors on policy issues related to Black people.

=== Academia ===
In 1927, Houchins began teaching at Wiley College in Marshall, Texas as professor of economics and government.

Houchins joined the Howard University department of economics in 1961. His teaching focused on labor institutions, labor markets, and labor law. His teaching interests stressed the importance of labor institutions in economic affairs.

He officially retired from Howard University in 1985, but Houchins remained on campus with emeritus status and continued to participate in Economics Department functions and continued to mentor students until his death in 1990.

The 'Dr. Joseph R. Houchins Endowed Scholarship Fund' at Howard University was started in 1991. It helps preserve his legacy of promoting excellence in the field of economics, challenging students to realize their potential, and helps students in their quest for higher learning.

== Personal life and death ==
In 1935, Joseph R. Houchins married Frankie V. Lea. They had one daughter, Sue Houchins.

Houchins died on January 5, 1990, in Washington, D.C.

== Works ==
Houchins wrote a number of books and articles regarding labor including: Houchins JR. Significant facts concerning the Negro population (Population—special reports-P-1943). U.S. Department of Commerce, Bureau of the Census; 1943. Houchins JR. Causes of Negro insurance company failures (Bulletin of the United States Department of Commerce); 1937. Houchins JR. Negro Chambers of Commerce. (Bulletin of the United States Department of Commerce); 1936. Houchins JR. The Negro worker and organized labor. Master's Thesis. Kroch Library Rare & Manuscripts. H835. Ithaca, NY: Cornell University Library; 1930. Houchins JR. The protection of racial minorities and certain excluding practices of organized labor. Cornell University, ProQuest Dissertations Publishing 0120847; 1934. Houchins JR. The Negro in professional occupations in the United States: the relative status of the Negro population in the United States (Summer) J Negro Educ. 1953;22:3.
