= Freedom's People =

Freedom’s People, was a radio broadcast by NBC from 1941 to 1942 that explored this history and culture of African Americans to further shore up support for Civil Rights. The show was produced through the support of "black federal officials, prominent black intellectuals such as Alain Locke and Sterling Allen Brown, black performing artists such as Paul Robeson, and racially moderate whites."

== Sources ==
- Savage, Barbara Dianne (1999). Broadcasting Freedom: Radio, War, and the Politics of Race, 1938-1948. UNC Press Books. ISBN 978-0-807-84804-3.
