= Roscoe E. Lewis =

Chemistry professor

Roscoe E. Lewis was a chemistry professor at Hampton University and a scholar in the United States who led efforts to document and publish an account of African American experiences in Virginia. He was a fellow of the Rosenwald Foundation.

He was born in Washington D.C.'s Anacostia neighborhood. He led the African American unit of the Virginia Writers' Project.

He wrote about his work to W. E. B. Du Bois before a conference they were attending at Atlanta University.

For his Writers' Project work he produced films and audiotapes. Officials censored discussions of cruel punishments, forced marriages, family separations, ridicule of whites, and praise of Union soldiers from the interviews. Publication of Writers' Project research from black researchers was generally obstructed.

== Publishings ==
- "The Role of Pressure Groups" (1943)
- The Negro in Virginia
