= World Is Yours (album) =

Studio album by Mass of the Fermenting Dregs
- Released: January 21, 2009
- Genre: Post-hardcore
- Length: 22:14
- Label: AVOCADO Records
- Producer: Kentaro Nakao

Mass of the Fermenting Dregs chronology
MASS OF THE FERMENTING DREGS (2008)	World Is Yours (2009)	Hikizuru Beat / Made. (2010)

World Is Yours is the second studio album by the Japanese band Mass of the Fermenting Dregs. It was released on January 21, 2009, through AVOCADO Records.

== Background ==
Throughout 2008, Mass of the Fermenting Dregs picked up momentum in Japan, performing at multiple festivals including Arabaki Rock Fest and Rush Ball, as well as opening for acts including Quruli.

In an interview with Hisashi Minami of OTOTOY, both Natsuko Miyamoto and Chiemi Ishimoto shared experience with Number Girl's Kentaro Nakao, who would then co-produce World Is Yours. The artwork for the album was designed by manga artist and illustrator Ai Kozaki.

== Release ==
World Is Yours was announced in November 2008. The band additionally announced a tour supporting the release, taking place across 11 cities in Japan throughout February 2009. World Is Yours was released on CD on January 21, 2009, through AVOCADO Records.

On July 21, 2021, over a decade following the album's initial CD release, World Is Yours was released on digital services by Universal Music Group.

== Reception ==
Following its release, World Is Yours was well received, but was not of particularly popular interest in Japan and was not often performed by the band. Over time, the album as well as the band grew interest from the Western world; its tracks are now among the band's most played songs on Spotify. On a staff review posted to Sputnikmusic, the album received a 4.0/5 rating.

== Track listing ==
No.	Title	Length
1.	"Kono Speed no Saki e" (このスピードの先へ)	3:25
2.	"Aoi, Koi, Daidaiiro No Hi" (青い、濃い、橙色の日)	4:42
3.	"Kakuiumono" (かくいうもの)	4:03
4.	"She is inside, He is outside"	2:54
5.	"Nan Nan" (なんなん)	3:39
6.	"World Is Yours" (ワールドイズユアーズ)	3:31
