= The World Is Yours (radio show) =

Weekly educational radio show

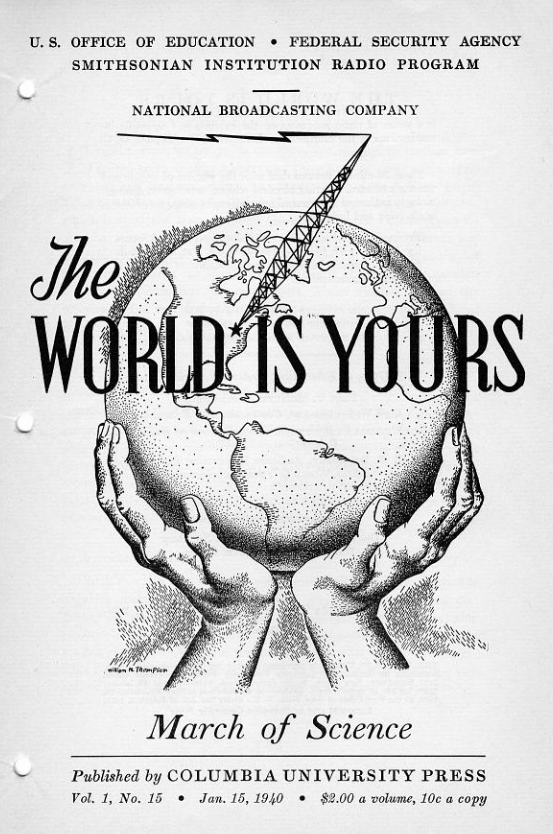
- Supplementary material for the radio program The World is Yours
- Running time: 30 min.
- Country of origin: United States
- Language(s): English
- Home station: NBC Red Network
- Produced by: Webster P. True
- Executive producer(s): John W. Studebaker
- Original release: June 7, 1936 – May 10, 1942

The World Is Yours (TWIY) was a weekly thirty-minute radio show that aired Sunday afternoons from June 7, 1936 to May 10, 1942 as part of the Educational Radio Project, funded by the Works Progress Administration.

TWIY was the first radio program produced by the Smithsonian Institution, in conjunction with United States Department of the Interior Office of Education and was one of the most successful educational radio programs of the 1930s. Out-of-work actors and musicians presented the 303 programs which covered various aspects of the Smithsonian's collections and research. Starting in 1939, the program came with additional print materials which could be requested for ten cents each. The Smithsonian filled 800,000 requests for supplementary materials, and has 9,000 pages of educational supplements in their archives. The scripts for the show were also made available for people who wished to air their own programs, and were provided by request along with a production manual, handbook of sound effects and a bibliography. The program was incredibly popular, generating over half a million letters by 1941.

Webster P. True, Chief of the Smithsonian Institution Editorial Division, was the manager of the project and described it in a presentation as, "not a classroom or direct instruction program – we think of it rather as collateral listening." Episodes were narrated by an explorer named Oldtimer, who gave dramatic lectures in travelogue style to tell people about topics in geography, natural history, science and the arts. Topics were popularized to bring learning to more Americans, but some curators at the Smithsonian were concerned that this approach "trivialized science and history and contributed to reductive stereotyping of complex civilizations."

The program ended in 1942 because of the war effort.

== A Public Service ==
The programs were works produced by federal employees of the United States government, thus all episodes underwritten by the Office of Education are in the public domain. As Marcel Chotkowski LaFollette writes in his book, Science on the Air: Popularizers and Personalities on Radio and Early Television, “The economics of the arrangement favored the network and the Smithsonian. American taxpayers, through the Office of Education, underwrote all production costs, including professional scriptwriters, and subsidized publication of the supplementary booklets and monthly magazine whose circulation grew eventually to 150,000.” But, as federal WPA and Office of Education funding waned, beginning on July 1, 1940, "the Smithsonian supported Webster True’s time and the salary of a professional writer to produce first-draft scripts,” while, “the network paid for final script writing and for the actors, production director, music director, and New York staff.”

== Recognition ==
The Women's National Radio Committee awarded The World Is Yours a 'Best Adult Education Program' recognition on April 19, 1939.
