= Mass of the Fermenting Dregs =

Japanese musical group

- MOTFD performing in Leeds, England 2026 Left to right: Natsuko Miyamoto, Isao Yoshino, Naoya Ogura

Background information
- Origin: Kobe, Japan
- Genres: Alternative rock, post-hardcore, shoegaze, math rock
- Years active: 2002–2012, 2015–present
- Labels: Avocado(former); EMI(former); Flake; LIKE A FOOL
- Members: Natsuko Miyamoto; Isao Yoshino; Naoya Ogura
- Past members: Reiko Gotoh; Chiemi Ishimoto
- Website: https://www.motfd.com/

Mass of the Fermenting Dregs (Japanese: マス オブ ザ ファーメンティング ドレッグス, Hepburn: Masu obu za Fāmentingu Doreggusu; stylized in all caps) is a Japanese post-hardcore/shoegaze trio formed in Kobe, in 2002. In Japanese, they are also popularly known by a shortened form of their name, Masu Dore (マスドレ). They are known for a tightly arranged, guitar-driven style, melodic pop vocals and a high-energy stage presence at their live events.

Starting with the release of their self-titled EP in January 2008, they signed to the Japanese indie rock record label Avocado Records. They have released four albums since their second EP. After their first album, they have released independently or gone through Flake Sounds.

== History ==
=== Early career ===
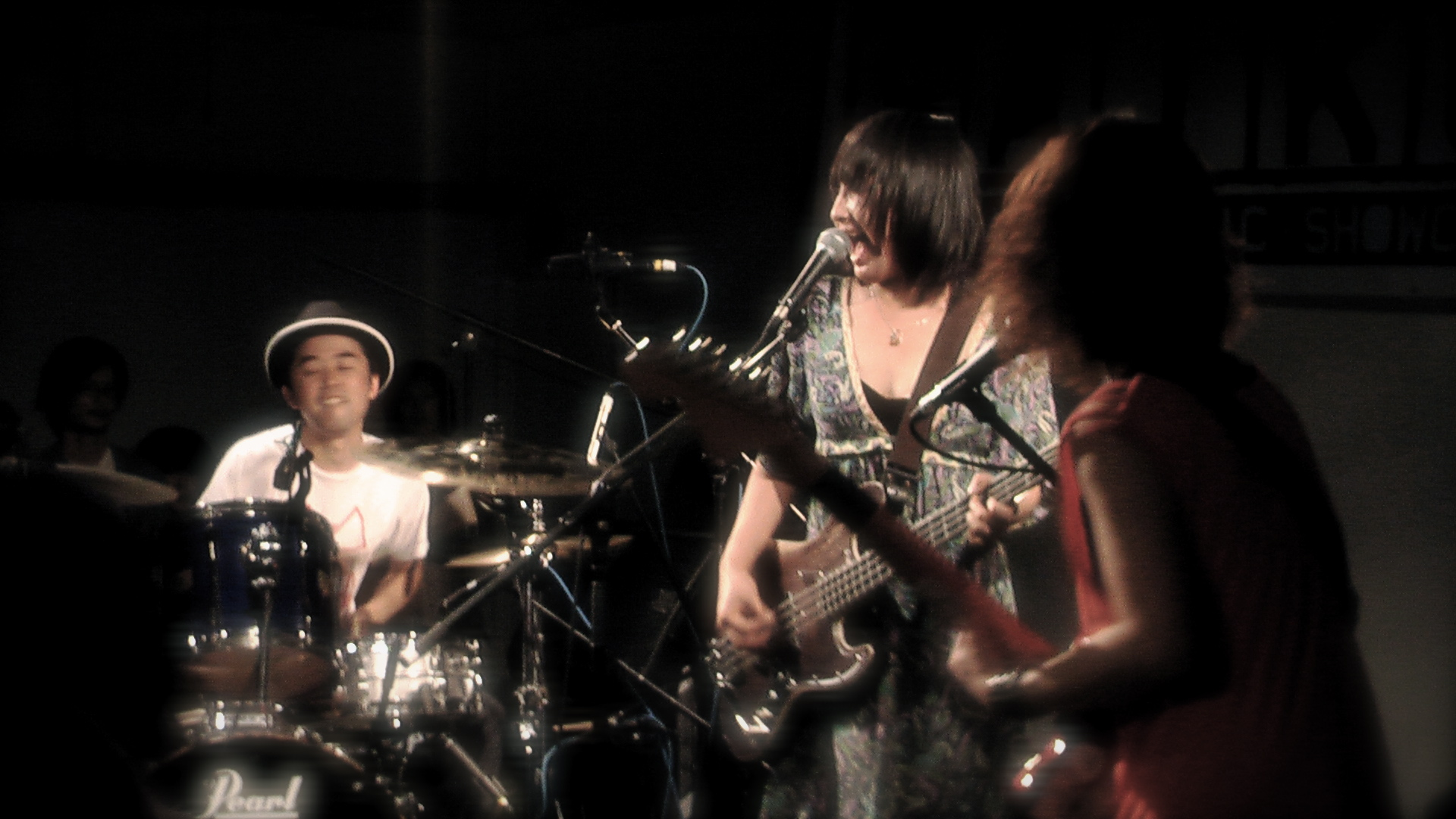
MOTFD performing in Roppongi, 2009

Mass of the Fermenting Dregs was formed in 2002 in Kobe, Hyogo Prefecture, with the original all-female lineup of Natsuko Miyamoto, Chiemi Ishimoto and Reiko Gotoh. The name of the band was conceived by simply lining up words the members liked. Following Reiko's departure from the band in October 2007, the band toured with the official lineup of Natsuko and Chiemi, with various musicians serving as a "support drummer". Their breakthrough came at the 2007 "Road to Tarbox Audition" competition held by EMI Japan, which put the band in contact with noted American record producer Dave Fridmann (The Flaming Lips, OK Go) of Tarbox Road Studios. With Fridmann producing, they recorded two tracks, I F A Surfer and Bears (ベアーズ), which appeared on their 2008 self-titled E.P. In 2010, support drummer Isao Yoshino became an official member of the band, prior to the release of their major label debut album.

=== Departure of Chiemi Ishimoto ===
In October 2010, it was announced that the band's guitarist of six years, Chiemi Ishimoto, would be leaving the group after completing the band's national tour on 11 December 2010. Her leaving was due to a medical panic disorder. Ishimoto's last performance was held at the Shibuya Club Quattro. Guitarist and lead vocalist Eriko Hashimoto of the band Chatmonchy attended the performance, sharing the enthralling experience of the final performance of "End Roll" on her official blog on her band's official website.

=== Departure of Isao Yoshino ===
In December 2011, Isao Yoshino announced that he would be leaving the group for undisclosed reasons. This left Miyamoto as the sole founding and active member of the band.

=== Dissolution ===
Though Natsuko Miyamoto, with the help of supporting members, continued to perform as Mass of the Fermenting Dregs through the spring of 2012, on September the 1st of the same year, she officially announced that Mass of the Fermenting Dregs would cease to exist as of that day. As a parting present, Miyamoto shared what was, at that moment, the last of the works recorded with Yoshino. A song titled "たんたんたん" (tantantan) was made available for download through a direct link placed within the page containing the departing letter to the fans on the official M.o.F.D. website.

=== Reformation (2015–present) ===
In December the M.o.F.D website started to update, deleting the departing letter on the website. Natsuko Miyamoto sent hints on Twitter about M.o.F.D, and the band was later confirmed to play on the New Year's Q2 Concert, thus confirming the reunion of the band. In May 2016, the band played in three Canadian cities on the "Next Music From Tokyo" concert tour.

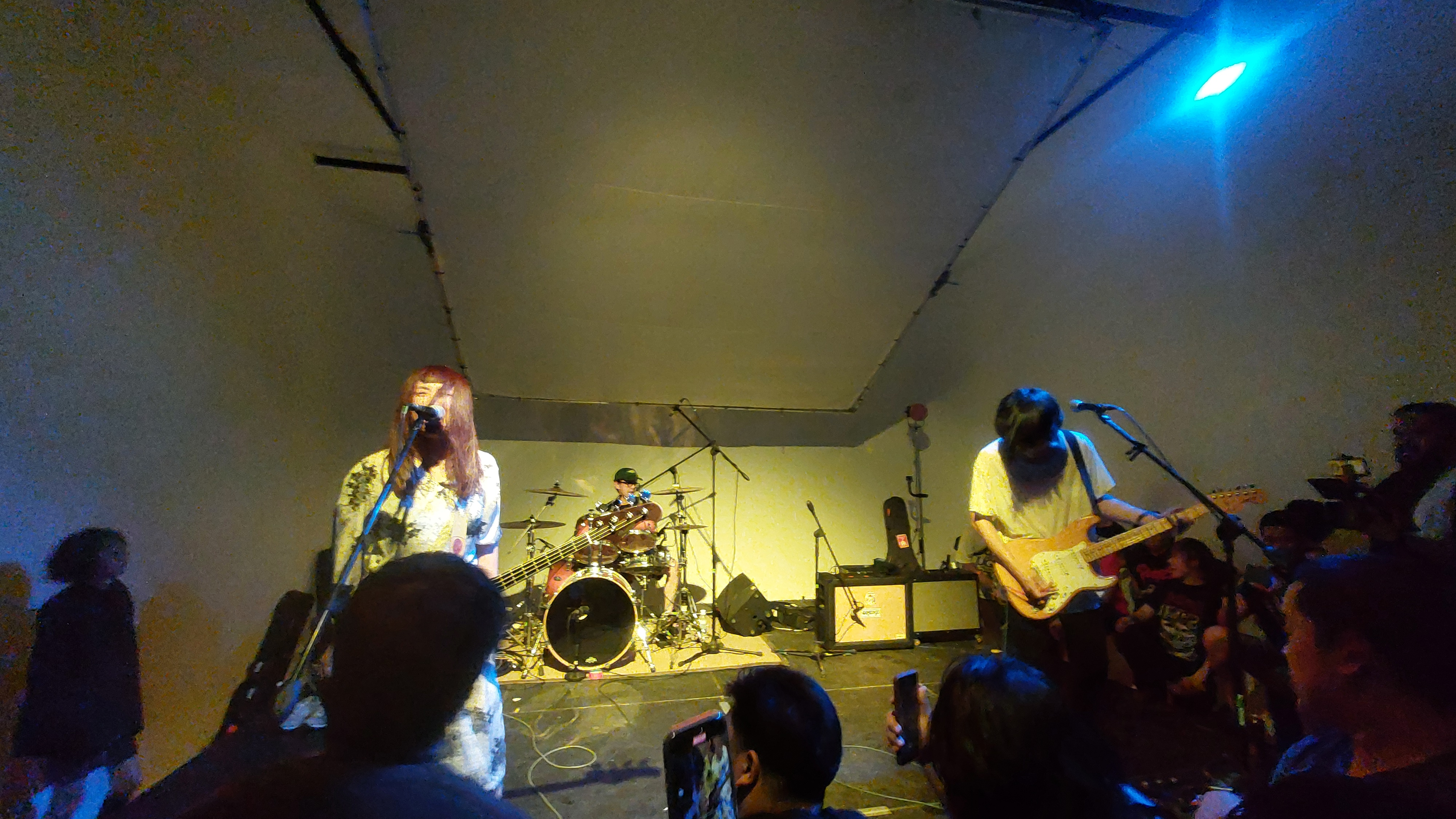
MOTFD performing in Manila, 2024

On 1 August 2022, the M.o.F.D. website was updated, announcing a new album titled "Awakening:Sleeping." Similar announcements were made on the same day on the band's Instagram account as well as Natsuko Miyamoto's account with a digital release marked for 17 August 2022, as well as a CD release on 7 October. The band also announced that they would be planning to do a European Tour the following year. On 9 September, the band had opened up for HARU NEMURI at the WWW X Shibuya before heading out on their second U.S. Tour.

On 14 August 2026, the band released their sixth album, Iwaou. Days prior, the band announced a tour in support of the album.

== Style and influences ==
The band's sound is often compared to that of other influential Japanese post-hardcore acts, notably Number Girl. They are often associated with the alternative/progressive rock act 9mm Parabellum Bullet, with whom they toured in early 2009. The English version of the band's website also claims western alternative rock bands Sugar, The Wedding Present, and The Smashing Pumpkins as influences on their songwriting.

== Members ==
=== Current members ===
- Natsuko Miyamoto (宮本菜津子, Miyamoto Natsuko) – lead vocals, bass guitar (2002–present)
- Naoya Ogura (小倉直也, Ogura Naoya) – guitars, vocals (2010–present)
- Isao Yoshino (吉野功, Yoshino Isao) – drums, vocals (2007–2011, 2015–present)

=== Former members ===
- Reiko Gotoh (後藤玲子, Gotoh Reiko) – drums, backing vocals (2002–2007)
- Chiemi Ishimoto (石本知恵美, Ishimoto Chiemi) – guitars, backing vocals (2002–2010)

== Discography ==
Kirametal (demo) – released 15 September 2006, independent

No.	Title	Length
1.	"delusionalism"	3:41
2.	"I F A SURFER"	3:35
3.	"skabetty"	4:44

MASS OF THE FERMENTING DREGS – released 16 January 2008, AVOCADO Records

No.	Title	Length
1.	"delusionalism"	3:41
2.	"Highlight (ハイライト Hairaito)"	3:50
3.	"skabetty"	4:46
4.	"Endroll (エンドロール Endorooru)"	9:27
5.	"I F A SURFER"	3:40
6.	"Bears (ベアーズ Beaazu)"	4:46

World Is Yours (ワールド イズ ユアーズ Waarudo Izu Yuaazu) – released 21 January 2009, AVOCADO Records

No.	Title	Length
1.	"Kono Supīdo No Saki He (このスピードの先へ, tr. Beyond this Speed)"	3:24
2.	"Aoi, Koi, Daidaīro No Hi (青い、濃い、橙色の日, tr. Blue, Deep and Orange Day)"	4:41
3.	"Kaku Iu Mono (かくいうもの, tr. Such Things)"	4:03
4.	"She is inside, He is outside"	2:53
5.	"Nan Nan (なんなん)"	3:39
6.	"World Is Yours (ワールド イズ ユアーズ)"	3:31

Hikizuru Beat / Made. (ひきずるビート / まで。 Hikizuru bīto/ made.) – released 2 October 2010, AVOCADO Records

No.	Title	Length
1.	"Hikizuru bīto (ひきずるビート, tr. Dizzying beat)"	4:16
2.	"Made. (まで。, tr. Until.)"	3:20

ゼロコンマ、色とりどりの世界 – released 8 April 2010, AVOCADO Records

No.	Title	Length
1.	"Zero Comma Iro Toridori No Sekai (ゼロコンマ、色とりどりの世界, tr. Zero Comma, Colorful World)"	4:32
2.	"Made (Jounetsu Mix) (まで。情熱ミックス)"	3:21
3.	"Owari No Hajimari (終わりのはじまり, tr. The Beginning of the End)"	2:58
4.	"RAT"	3:18
5.	"ONEDAY"	5:06
6.	"Cider To Kimi (サイダーと君)"	3:32
7.	"Zureru (ズレる)"	3:25
8.	"Hikizuru Beat (ひきずるビート)"	4:17
9.	"Sanzameku (さんざめく)"	4:56

たんたんたん – released 9 January 2012 (via official website – download only)

No.	Title	Length
1.	"tantantan (たんたんたん)"	4:21

スローモーションリプレイ – released 3 January 2017 7" Vinyl

No.	Title	Length
1.	"Slow-Motion Replay (スローモーションリプレイ)"	3:36

No New World – released 7 April 2018, independent

No.	Title	Length
1.	"New Order"	3:27
2.	"あさひなぐ (ASAHINAGU)"	4:19
3.	"だったらいいのにな (If Only)"	3:44
4.	"YAH YAH YAH"	0:50
5.	"No New World"	2:59
6.	"HuHuHu"	2:40
7.	"Sugar"	5:07
8.	"スローモーションリプレイ (Slow-motion Replay)"	3:37

Naked Album – released 14 August 2020, independent

No.	Title	Length
1.	"decision (2011/5/15 at GALVASTUDIO)"	6:12
2.	"くぼたさん (2011/5/15 at GALVASTUDIO)"	3:36
3.	"うたを歌えば (2017/2/12 at OGC's ROOM)"	3:05
4.	"New Order (2017/4/10 at Studio Revival)"	3:33
5.	"Sugar (2017/1/14 at Studio Revival)"	5:04
6.	"HuHuHu (2017/4/10 at Studio Revival)"	2:41
7.	"あさひなぐ (2017/4/10 at Studio Revival)"	4:24
8.	"だったらいいのにな (2011/5/15 at GALVASTUDIO)"	3:57
9.	"ADIDAS (2019/5/2 at Studio Revival)"	3:13
10.	"HOSSA (2011/6/15 at LDK Studio)"	2:40

Awakening:Sleeping – released 17 August 2022, FLAKE SOUNDS

No.	Title	Length
1.	"Dramatic"	3:47
2.	"いらない (feat. 蛯名啓太 from Discharming man)"	2:48
3.	"MELT"	3:10
4.	"1960"	8:28
5.	"Helluva (feat. Taigen Kawabe from BO NINGEN)"	2:01
6.	"Ashes"	3:06
7.	"After the rain"	1:54
8.	"鳥とリズム"	3:18
9.	"Just"	4:27

LIVE IN JAPAN – released 1 March 2024, independent

No.	Title	Length
1.	"青い、濃い、橙色の日 (Live at TUPPENCE STUDIO, Tokyo, Japan, 2023)"	4:57
2.	"かくいうもの (Live at TUPPENCE STUDIO, Tokyo, Japan, 2023)"	4:37
3.	"She is inside, He is outside (Live at TUPPENCE STUDIO, Tokyo, Japan, 2023)"	2:51
4.	"delusionalism (Live at TUPPENCE STUDIO, Tokyo, Japan, 2023)"	3:37
5.	"エンドロール (Live at TUPPENCE STUDIO, Tokyo, Japan, 2023)"	8:54
6.	"I F A SURFER (Live at TUPPENCE STUDIO, Tokyo, Japan, 2023)"	3:34
7.	"ワールドイズユアーズ (Live at TUPPENCE STUDIO, Tokyo, Japan, 2023)"	3:32

Iwaou – released 14 August 2026, FLAKE SOUNDS

No.	Title	Length
1.	"Simmer Summer"	3:35
2.	"Let It Go"	2:49
3.	"Hers"	4:42
4.	"Dareka ga kizu wo ou sono shunkan wo (誰かが傷を負うその瞬間を)"	3:55
5.	"Iwaou (祝おう)"	4:24
6.	"Ghost (幽霊)"	9:03
