= Ambrose Caliver =

Ambrose Caliver (1894–1962) was an American teacher and Dean who changed the face of Black education on a national scale. Caliver devoted much of his professional life to adult literacy, although he also took an active role in such matters as displaced persons, human rights, public affairs, aging, and professional development of adult educators.

== Early life and education ==
Born 1894 in Saltville, Virginia, Caliver graduated from Austin High School in 1911. He attended Knoxville College in Tennessee and graduated with a B.A. in 1915. He then married Everly Rosalie Rucker a year later in 1916. After college, Caliver began teaching at numerous high schools in Tennessee and also gained experience as a High School principal. By 1917 he was hired to work for the historically Black college in Nashville, Tennessee by the name of Fisk University, where he was in charge of their new vocational education program. Caliver earned his M.A. from the University of Wisconsin in 1921. In 1930, he earned his Ph.D. in Education from Columbia University’s Teacher’s College. He was the first Black person in the city to earn a Ph. D. and the first to earn that degree in the field of education.

== Career ==
While at Fisk, Caliver worked a variety of positions until he finally was invited to be the Dean of the University in 1927. Three years later, Caliver was appointed to the new position of Senior Specialist in the Education of Negroes in the U.S. Office of Education by President Herbert Hoover. When F.D.R was elected President two years later, he kept his post and became a member of F.D.R.’s “Black cabinet”. [6]During Caliver's time in Cabinet, he was very motivated by the inequity in the education of Blacks and whites and set out to raise national awareness, particularly in the rural South. He traveled furiously to accurately document the lack of funding for public schooling.

During his tenure in the U.S. Office of Education, he published numerous articles, bulletins, and pamphlets on current topics relating to African American education and assembled conferences and committees on these matters. A few of his most famous articles titled, “The Education of Negro Teachers” and “Secondary Education for Negroes.” In his quest to achieve higher education for African-Americans, Caliver also created a nine part radio series, broadcast on NBC, that highlighted the history and achievements of his fellow African-Americans. The series, “Freedom Peoples”, occurred from 1941 to 1942 and was the first substantial program in mass media that focuses solely on the lives and history of the African-American people. The series included Inventions, which highlighted contributions by African-American inventors, Steal Away which used slave spirituality to show the capacity of African-Americans to turn hardships and pain into beauty and art, W.C. Handy, which follows the story of the beginning of the blues movement, and War Work, which shows the contributions of African-Americans to World War I and World War II.

== National studies ==
Caliver performed many duties during his tenure in the U.S. Office of Education, but perhaps the most influential work that he did was the studies he had compiled on a national scale. During his time in office he notably headed the National Survey of Teacher Education, the National Secondary Education Survey (1932), the National Survey of the Vocational and Educational Guidance of Negroes (1939), and the National Survey of the Higher Education of Negroes. He compiled the National Statistics of the Education of Negroes from 1933 to 1934 and again from 1935 to 1936. These works changed the face of black education on a national scale, bringing to light the common fact that there was an overwhelming lack of secondary education for African-Americans. Ambrose also served as an adviser for a number of national and international projects, including the U.S. Displaced Persons Commission (1949). (A displaced person is the same as a forced migrant, meaning one who is forced to leave his/her own country.) He also worked as the president of the Adult Education Association whose primary focus was in advancing and promoting adults to seek higher education, and was the organizer of the NACEN (National Advisory on the Education of Negroes) in which he dies during his term in 1962.

== Recognition ==
During the eighth conference of the Prairie view educational Conference in 1937 aimed to “do for Texas what Caliver had done for the country” The conference was the most important discussion on Black higher education in Texas and cited Caliver's 1932 study of Black secondary education, along with Caliver's study of Black rural education in 1935.

In 1930, Ambrose was appointed Senior Specialist in the education of Negroes in the U.S. Office of Education by President Hoover. Years later, he is named director of the Project for Literacy Education in (1946).

== Death ==
Caliver Ambrose died in 1962 in Washington, D.C, while serving out his term for the National Advisory on the Education of Negroes.
