= Granada Theatre (Chicago) =

Former movie theatre

Coordinates: 41°59′58.1″N 87°39′36.6″W

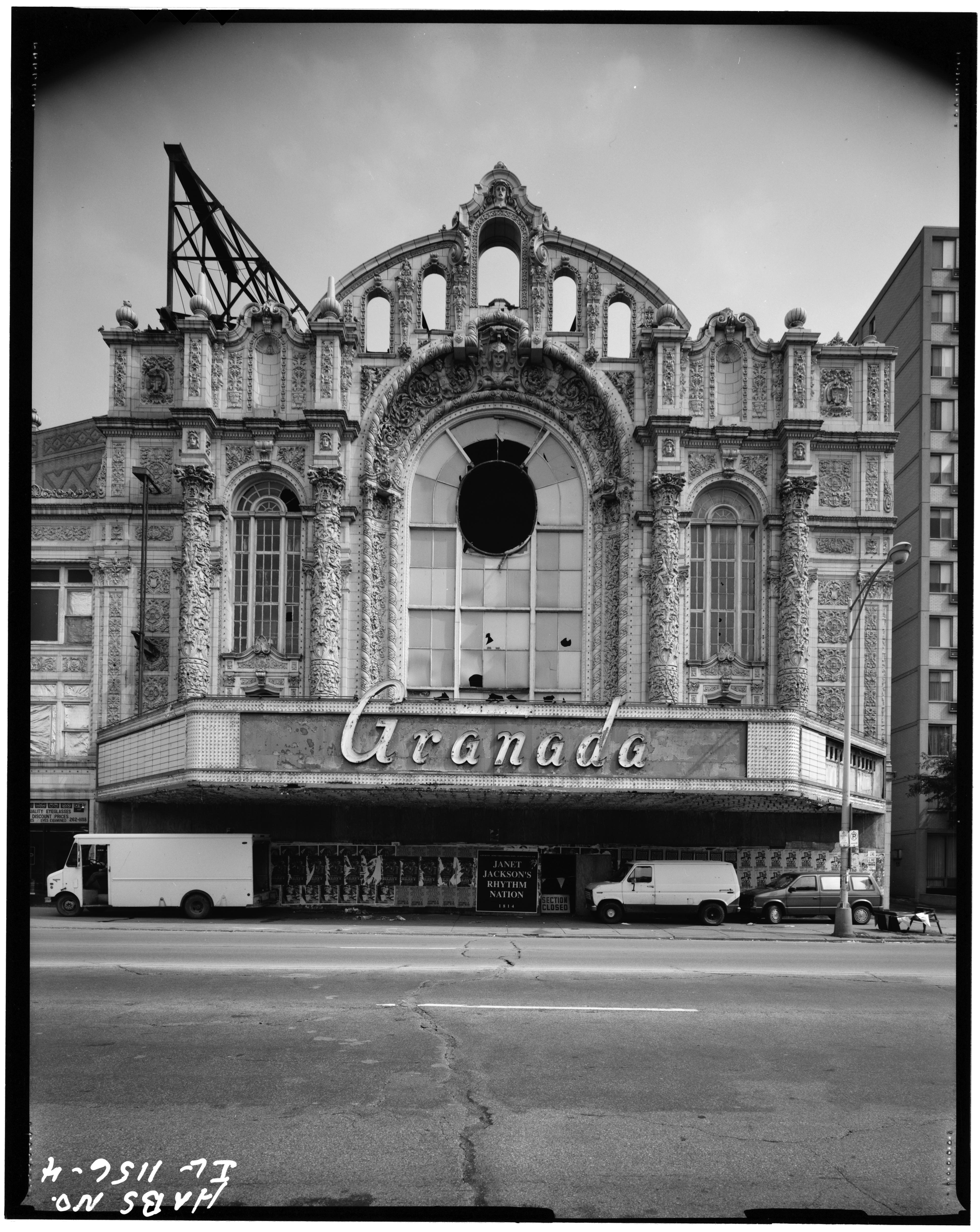
- Granada Theater image from Historic American Buildings Survey
- Interactive map of the Granada Theatre (Chicago) area

General information
- Opened: 1926
- Demolished: 1989–1990

The Granada Theatre was a 3,400–seat movie palace located at 6427-41 North Sheridan Road in the Rogers Park neighborhood of Chicago. It was constructed in 1926 for the Marks Brothers, who were major theatre operators in the U.S. Edward E. Eichenbaum was the principal designer for the architectural firm of Levy & Klein. Eichenbaum also designed the Marbro, Regal, and Century theatres.

The Marks Brothers operated the theatre until 1934, when Balaban and Katz purchased the property. That firm and its successors—United Paramount Theatres, ABC Great States Theatres and Plitt Theatres—operated the facility until approximately 1978. From then until the mid-eighties, it was used sporadically for rock concerts and presented midnight showings of The Rocky Horror Picture Show for several years.

Despite all attempts to save the theatre, Senior Life Styles Corporation purchased the property and demolished it in 1989-90 for a planned apartment/commercial structure.

The new 16–story apartment tower and shopping arcade constructed in 1991 was named "Granada Center". Loyola University eventually purchased the structure and transformed it into 12 floors of student apartments over a base containing parking, retail and university offices. The apartment tower, now converted to student housing, was renamed to "Fordham Hall". The retail and office portion remains named "Granada Center".

The Ryerson & Burnham Libraries at the Art Institute of Chicago holds archival materials, including photographs taken by the "Save Granada Theatre Committee".
