= Balaban and Katz =

Movie theatre corporation in Chicago, Illinois, US

Balaban and Katz Theater Corporation
- Type: Former subsidiary
- Industry: Movie theaters
- Founded: 1916
- Founders: A. J. Balaban; Sam Katz
- Headquarters: Chicago
- Parent: Famous Players–Lasky Corporation/; Paramount Pictures (1925–1949); American Broadcasting-Paramount Theatres/; American Broadcasting Companies, Inc.
- Website: www.balabanandkatz.com (defunct)

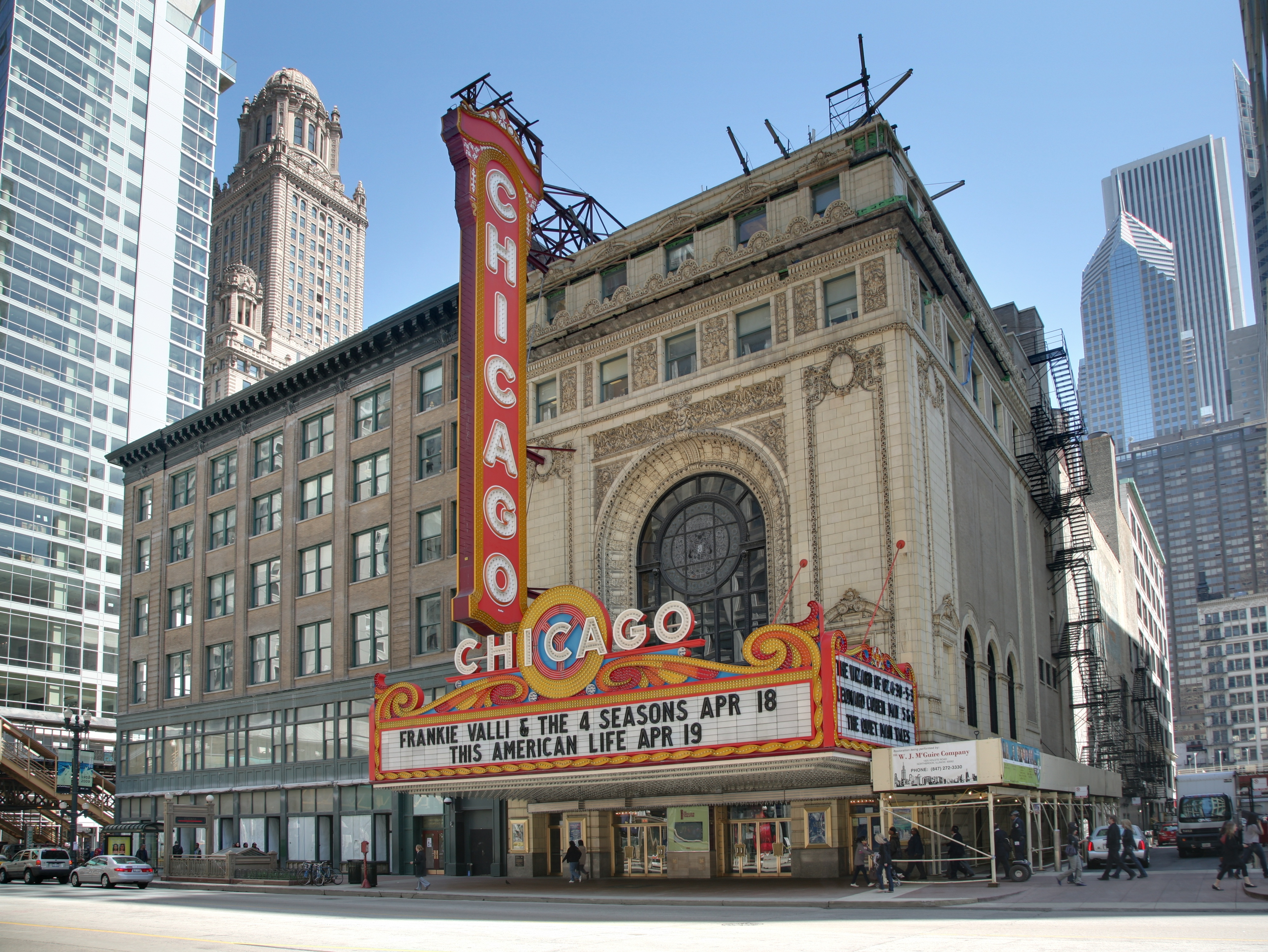
The Chicago Theatre, a city landmark

Balaban and Katz Theater Corporation, or B&K, was a theatre corporation which owned a chain of motion picture theaters in Chicago and surrounding areas.

== History ==
Balaban and Katz Theatre corporation started in 1916 in Chicago by A. J. Balaban and his brother-in-law Sam Katz (1892–1961).

It held its first meeting as a Delaware corporation on January 21, 1925. It merged with Lubliner and Trinz in July 1925. Famous Players–Lasky Corporation, forerunner of Paramount Pictures, bought a controlling interest in Balaban and Katz Corporation in 1926. It became a part of United Paramount Theatres in 1948 after Paramount was forced to sell off its theaters.

The company also held at the Paramount Pictures-Theaters split in 1949: WBKB (TV), WIBK (FM), 25% of WSMB New Orleans, 50% of a company applying for an Atlanta AM license, 10% of another licensee apply for a license in Hot Springs, and television applications for Detroit, Boston, Tampa, and Des Moines. Balaban & Katz became a subsidiary of United Paramount Theatres, Inc. (UPT).

UPT merged with American Broadcasting Company in 1953. The company tore down the Garrick Theater in 1960 and 1961 over the objections of Richard Nickel and other preservationists. The company was officially dissolved as an Illinois corporation on July 31, 1970.

== Theaters ==
Balaban and Katz chose to build their theaters (many designed by famous architects Rapp and Rapp) in rapidly growing outlying districts, convenient for the middle class population which provided the bulk of their patrons, as well as in downtown Chicago. The company is notable for being the first to offer air conditioning in its theaters and for including lavish stage shows. Balaban and Katz operated over a hundred theaters in the midwestern United States. There were more than 50 Chicago-area theaters operated by the Balaban and Katz company including:

North: Belmont, Century/Diversey Theatre, Cine, Covent, Granada, Howard, Lakeside, Northshore, Nortown, Pantheon, Riviera, and Uptown.

Northwest: Admiral, Alba, Belpark, Biltmore, Congress, Crystal, Drake, Gateway Theatre, Harding, Luna, Portage, Terminal, and Will Rogers.

South, Maryland, Regal, Southtown, Tivoli, and Tower.

West: Central Park, Iris, Manor, Marbro, Paradise, Senate, and State.

Loop: Apollo, Chicago, Garrick, Oriental, Roosevelt, and United Artists.

Suburban Chicago: Berwyn, Coronet, La Grange, Park, Valencia (Evanston), and Varsity (Evanston).

Waukegan: Academy

Sam Katz, a vice president at Balaban and Katz, became president of The Publix theaters group, a division of Famous Players Lasky. Its secretary, Barney Balaban, eventually became president of Paramount Pictures. Beginning in 1939, Balaban and Katz, along with parent company Paramount, was involved in the early development of the television broadcasting industry. The company owned several experimental television licenses, and in 1943 began broadcasting over WBKB (now WBBM-TV), the first commercial television station in Chicago.

Whenever Balaban and Katz decided that murals would become part of the interior design scheme, they would commission painter and muralist Louis Grell of Chicago to execute them. Grell painted murals inside the Chicago Theater, Gateway Theater, Uptown Theater and many Paramount Theaters across the midwest and America for Balaban and Katz.

The trademark for the company is owned by a historical foundation called the Balaban and Katz Historical Foundation. The foundation was founded by descendants of the original Balaban brothers. Its collection of B and K corporate documents is located in New Jersey. Theatre Historical Society, in Elmhurst, Illinois, maintains an extensive collection of architectural blueprints and large-format pictures of many Balaban and Katz theaters. In 2006, a documentary, Uptown: Portrait of a Palace, featured one of Balaban and Katz's most famous theaters, the Uptown. 2006 also saw the publication of a book on many of the B&K theatres, titled The Chicago Movie Palaces of Balaban and Katz, written by David Balaban with a foreword by theater historian Joseph DuciBella and published by Arcadia Publishing.

== See also ==
- United Paramount / Plitt Theatres
- List of experimental television stations
