= Legends South, Chicago =

Coordinates: 41°48′49″N 87°37′40″W

Robert Taylor Homes, Chicago
- Neighborhood
- Interactive map of Robert Taylor Homes, Chicago
- Country: United States
- City: Chicago, Illinois
- Community areas: Grand Boulevard, Washington Park
- First settled: 1962

Legends South, formerly Robert Taylor Homes, is a neighborhood located in the Grand Boulevard Community Area on the South side of Chicago, Illinois.

The neighborhood used to be named after the Chicago housing development, Robert Taylor Homes, that once took up most of the area. The buildings were overrun with crime and fell into disrepair. They were demolished in 2007. The area is now being redeveloped as Legends South with a mixed-income community in low-rise buildings as part of a federal block grant received for the purpose from the HOPE VI federal program.

== Parks ==
- Metcalfe Park
- Taylor Park

== Education ==
- Bronzeville Lighthouse CHTR
- Howalton School
- Safe Schools Alternative High School
- Beethoven
- ACE Technical Chtr HS

== Housing developments ==
- Hansberry Square
- Savoy Square
