= Levy & Klein =

Defunct American architectural firm

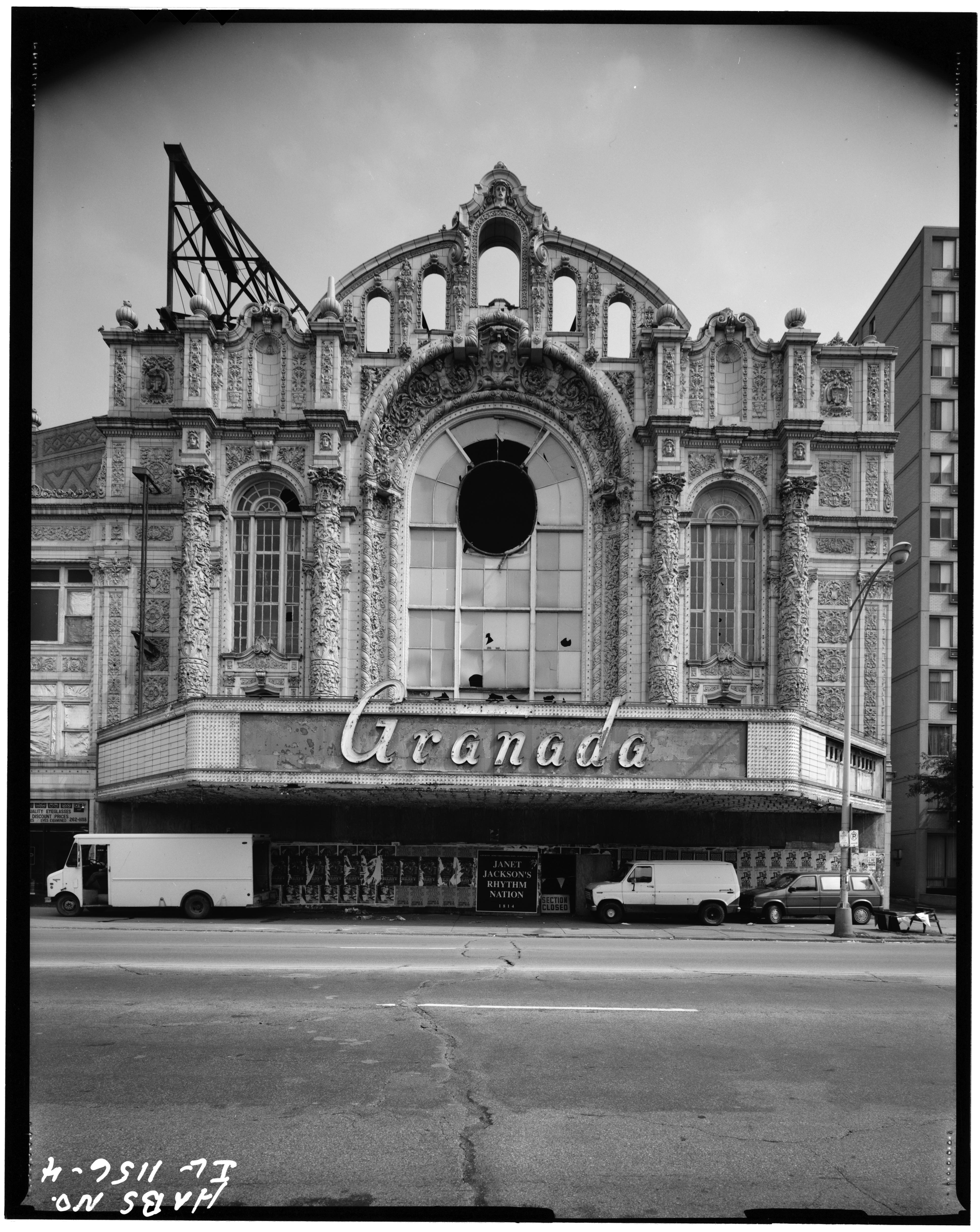

Levy & Klein was a prominent architectural firm known for their theater designs. Their work includes the Landmark's Century Centre Cinema in Chicago and Marbro Theater in Chicago. Their work also includes the Granada Theatre (Chicago) and North Avenue Baths Building (1921). Edward Eichenbaum is credited with several of the firm's theater designs.

== North Avenue Baths ==
The North Avenue Baths closed in the late 1980s They were almost torn down, but went-up for auction and were purchased by Steve Soble and Howard Natinsky in 1994. The building was converted into a ground floor restaurant space and upstairs apartments.

== Edward Eichenbaum ==
Eichenbaum is credited with designing the Granada Theater at 6427 North Sheridan Road; Landmark's Century Centre Cinema (originally the Diversey Theatre, later the Century Theatre) at 2828 North Clark Street; Marbro Theatre at 4110 West Madison Street; and the Regal Theatre at 4710 South Dr. Martin Luther King Jr. Drive. Landmark's Century Center Cinema operates in part of the Diversey/Century Theatre building, which was gutted and rebuilt as a multi-level shopping center in the mid-1970s.

== Additional work ==
- Regal Theater, South Side (Chicago)
- Hotel Felix (1926), a 12-story building at 111 West Huron Street in Chicago. Originally the Hotel Wacker, it was redeveloped into a new hotel.
- Bryn Mawr Apartment Hotel (1928), a 12-story apartment building at 5550 N. Kenmore Avenue and both a Chicago Landmark and contributing structure to the Bryn Mawr Historic District.
