= Live at the Regal =

Live album by B. B. King
- Released: 1965
- Recorded: November 21, 1964
- Venue: Regal Theater, Chicago, Illinois
- Genre: Blues
- Length: 34:46
- Label: ABC
- Producer: Johnny Pate

B. B. King chronology
My Kind of Blues (1961)	Live at the Regal (1965)	Confessin' the Blues (1966)

Professional ratings
Review scores
Source	Rating
AllMusic	5/5 stars
The Encyclopedia of Popular Music	5/5 stars
MusicHound Blues	5/5 stars
The Penguin Guide to Blues Recordings	+ “crown”
The Rolling Stone Jazz Record Guide	5/5 stars

Live at the Regal is a 1965 live album by American blues guitarist and singer B. B. King. It was recorded on November 21, 1964, at the Regal Theater in Chicago. The album is widely heralded as one of the greatest blues albums ever recorded and was ranked at number 141 in Rolling Stone's 2003 edition of the 500 Greatest Albums of All Time list, before dropping to number 299 in a 2020 revision. In 2005, Live at the Regal was selected for permanent preservation in the National Recording Registry at the Library of Congress in the United States.

Carlos Santana, Eric Clapton, John Mayer and Mark Knopfler are among musicians who have used the album as a primer before performances.

The album was included in Robert Christgau's "Basic Record Library" of 1950s and 1960s recordings—published in Christgau's Record Guide: Rock Albums of the Seventies (1981)—and in Robert Dimery's 1001 Albums You Must Hear Before You Die.

It was voted number 604 in Colin Larkin's All Time Top 1000 Albums 3rd Edition (2000). In the same book it was number 6 in the Top 50 Blues albums of All-Time.

== Recording ==
Live at the Regal was recorded on November 21, 1964, at the Regal Theater in Chicago, a venue King claimed to have played at "hundreds of times before". King's backing band consisted of Duke Jethro on the piano, Leo Lauchie on the bass, Kenneth Sands on the trumpet, Johnny Board and Bobby Forte on the tenor saxes, and Sonny Freeman on the drums. Jethro was originally scheduled to play the organ, but after his organ broke, King instructed Jethro to play the piano. When Jethro said he did not know how to play the piano, King replied "Well, just sit there and pretend — that's what you do most of the time anyway!"

== Track listing ==
Side one

1. "Every Day I Have the Blues" (Memphis Slim) – 2:38
2. "Sweet Little Angel" (Riley King, Jules Taub) – 4:12
3. "It's My Own Fault" (John Lee Hooker) – 3:29
4. "How Blue Can You Get" (Jane Feather) – 3:44
5. "Please Love Me" (King, Jules Taub) – 3:01

Side two

1. "You Upset Me Baby" (Joe Josea, Maxwell Davis) – 2:22
2. "Worry, Worry" (Davis Plumber, Taub) – 6:24
3. "Woke Up This Mornin'" (King) – 1:45
4. "You Done Lost Your Good Thing Now" (King, Josea) – 4:16
5. "Help the Poor" (Charlie Singleton) – 2:58

== Personnel ==
- B. B. King – guitar, vocals
- Leo Lauchie – bass
- Sonny Freeman – drums
- Duke Jethro – piano
- Johnny Board, Bobby Forte – tenor saxophone
- Kenneth "Kenny" Sands – trumpet
- Pervis Spann (side A), E. Rodney Jones (side B) – presenters

Technical

- Ron Steele Sr. – recording engineer
- Don Bronstein – album cover

== Charts ==
Chart (2014–2015)	Peak position
Australian Albums (ARIA)	75
German Albums (Offizielle Top 100)	85
Swiss Albums (Schweizer Hitparade)	44
UK Albums (OCC)	96
United States (Billboard)	56
