= Washington Park Court District =

Neighborhood in Chicago, Illinois

Coordinates: 41.804917°N 87.615044°W

Washington Park Court

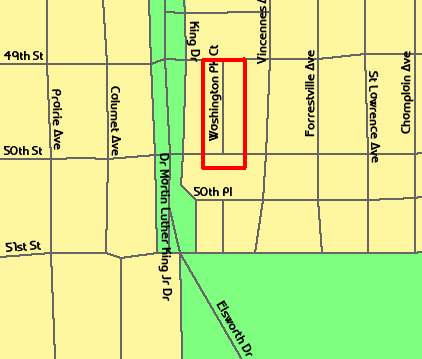
- Interactive map of Washington Park Court
- Maintained by: Department of Streets & Sanitation
- Location: Chicago
- North end: East 49th Street (one-way east)
- Major junctions: East 50th Street (hosts additional contributing properties.)
- South end: East 50th Street (one-way west)

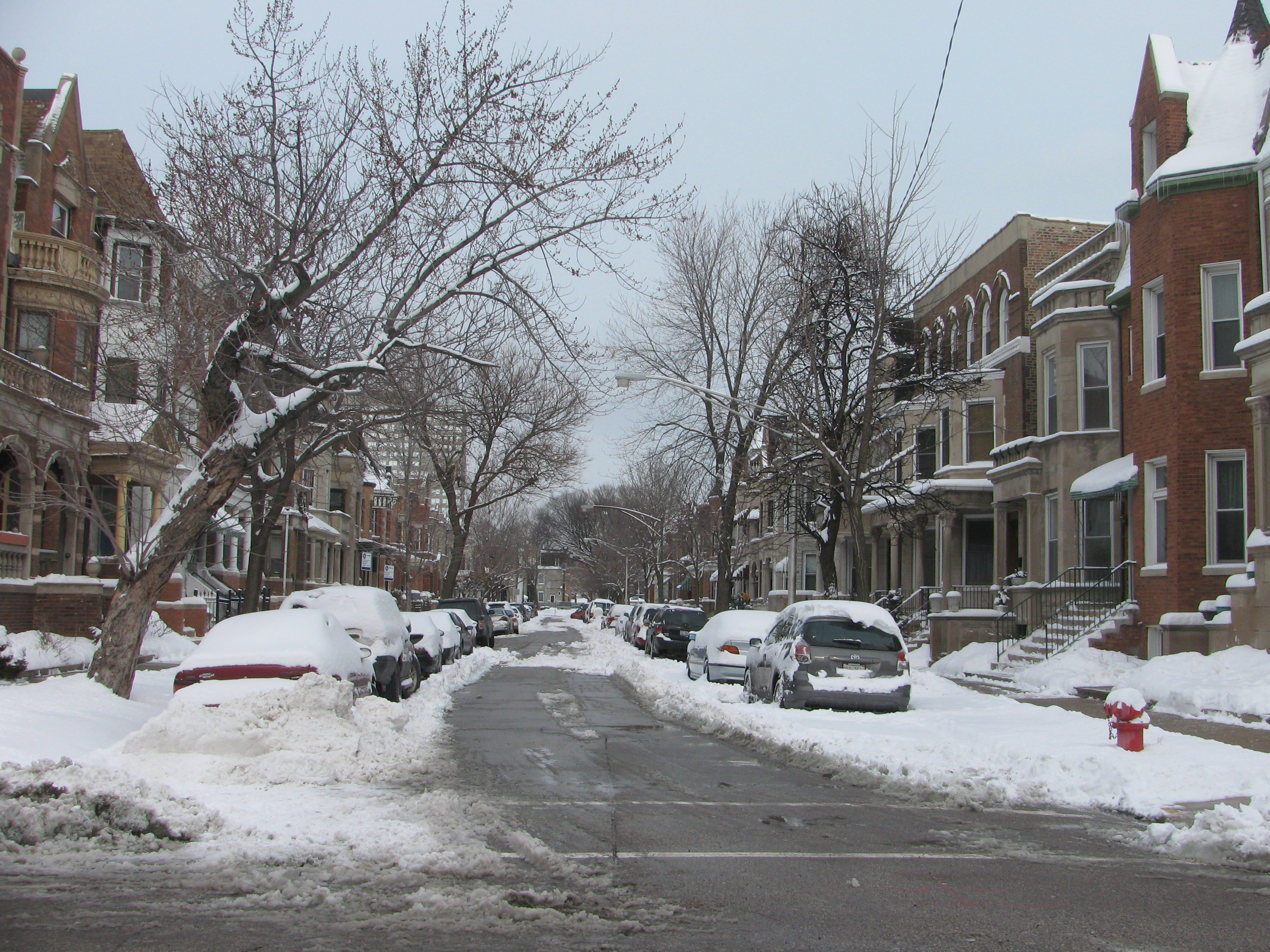
Washington Park Court from the south (November 1, 2009)

The Washington Park Court District is a Grand Boulevard community area neighborhood on the South Side of Chicago, Illinois. It was designated a Chicago Landmark on October 2, 1991. Despite its name, it is not located within either the Washington Park community area or the Washington Park park, but is one block north of both. The district was named for the Park.

The district includes row houses built between 1895 and 1905, with addresses of 4900–4959 South Washington Park Court and 417–439 East 50th Street. Many of the houses share architectural features. The neighborhood was part of the early twentieth century segregationist racial covenant wave that swept Chicago following the Great Migration. The community area has continued to be almost exclusively African American since the 1930s.

== Architecture ==
Washington Park Court District
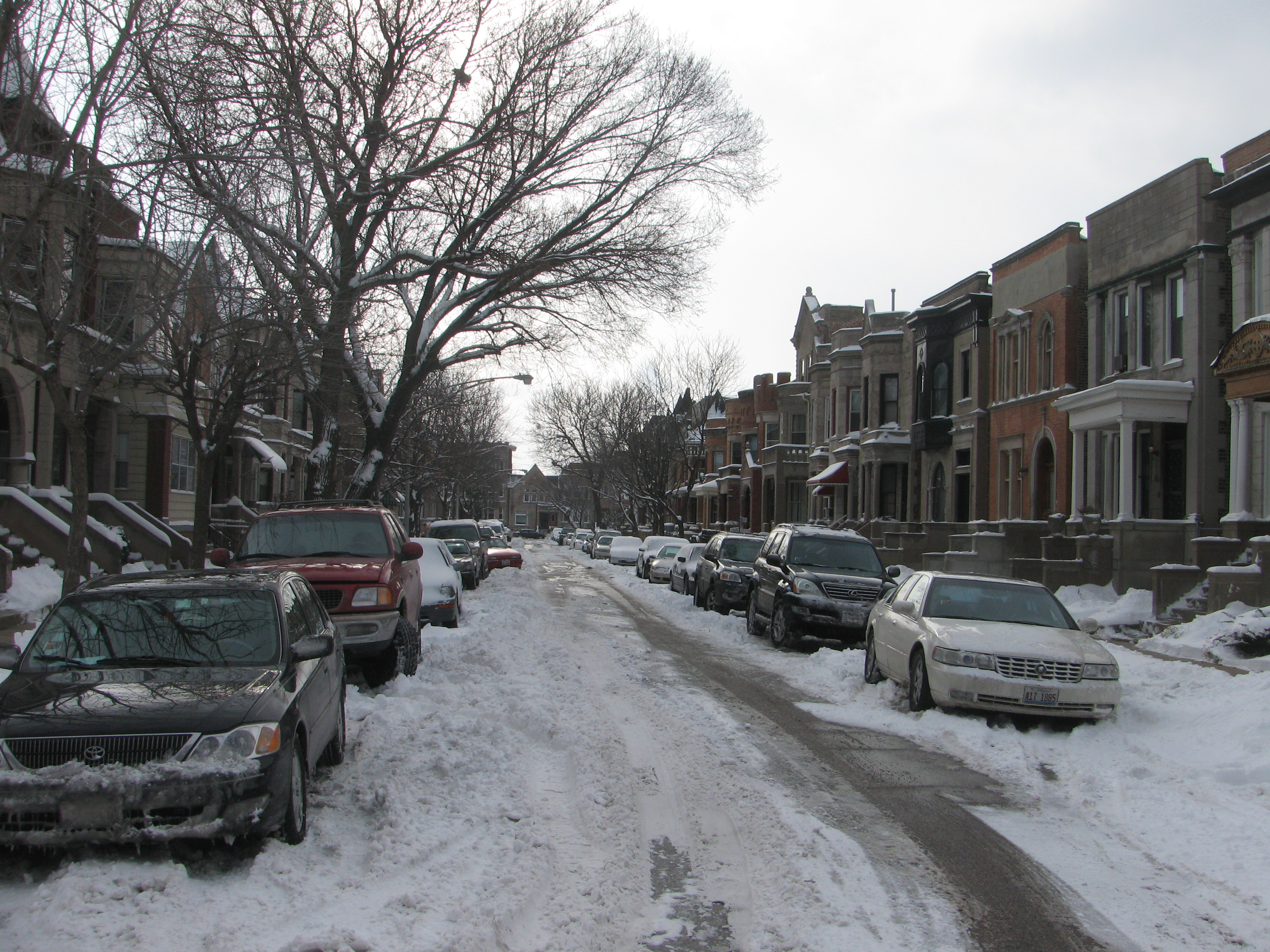
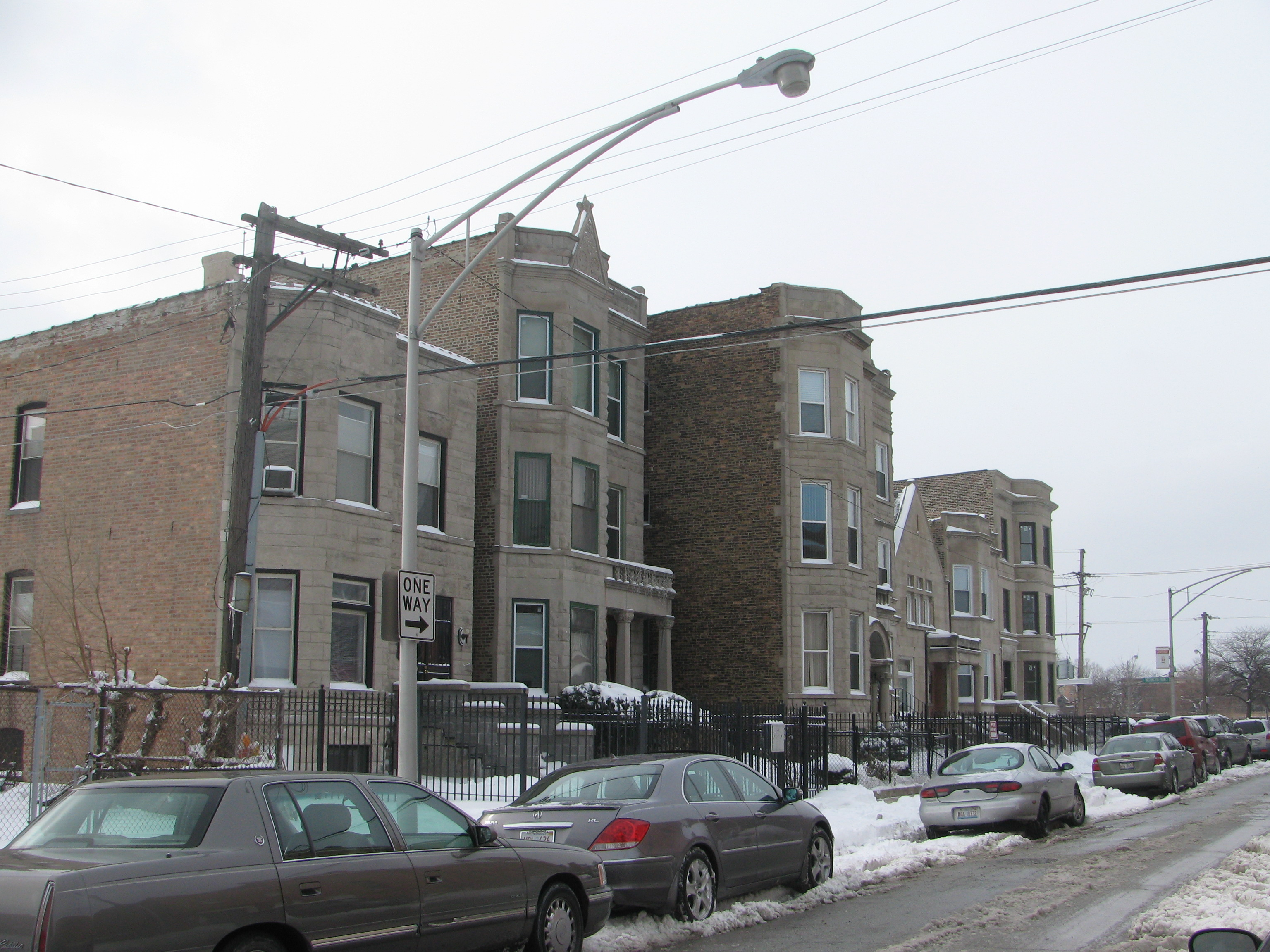
Top: Washington Park Court from north; Bottom: 50th St in Washington Park Court District

Washington Park Court, which runs one-way northbound from East 50th Street to East 49th Street, is a one-city block-long street located at 432 east in the Chicago street numbering system. Officially, it runs from 4900 south to 5060 south in the numbering system. The street and several adjacent homes at one end are recognized as a distinct district within the city, according to the City of Chicago Department of Planning and Development. In May 1990, the district was one of ten that were under consideration for Chicago Landmark status, and it was designated a Chicago Landmark on October 2, 1991. The district was named for the Park, which was designed by landscape architect Frederick Law Olmsted.

The T. G. Dickinson Real Estate Company, which created the subdivision in 1892, mandated 10-foot (3.0 m) setbacks for all properties and originally sold lots in small groups of two or three. Between 1895 and 1905, the tone of the district became clear with the development of its row houses. In 1990, the district contained forty-nine row houses that span a wide variety of architectural styles including Classical Revival and Romanesque. As of 2004, the district contained fifty-one properties. The street hosts residential designs of architect Henry Newhouse and of developers Andrew and John Dubach. At least twenty-five of the lots were developed by the Dubaches and at least twelve of the properties were designed by Newhouse. Their architectural contributions set the tone for the block, which uses mostly brick and limestone houses that share porch and cornice lines. Most houses have mansards or recessed roofs with bay fronts.

== Demographic change ==
Between 1900 and 1934 the African American population in Chicago grew from 30,000 to 236,000. The population was initially diluted in scattered places, but during this time, due to the change in the demographics of Chicago, it became concentrated in two large strips of land. The racial concentration was enforced by violence for few decades, until restrictive covenants became the preferred way to enforce segregation. Although they were previously rare, racially restrictive covenants among property owners that outlawed the purchase, lease, or occupation of their properties by African Americans became common in Chicago in the 1920s following the Great Migration, especially after the 1926 United States Supreme Court upheld racially restrictive covenants in Corrigan v. Buckley (271 U.S. 323 (1926)).

During the first half of the 20th century, The Black Belt was the term for the African-American neighborhood from 22nd Street to 31st Street along State Street on Chicago's South Side. South Side local businessmen and the University of Chicago became alarmed at the prospect of poorer blacks moving from the Black Belt due to a combination of racial succession and economic decline. Because 85% of Chicago was covenanted, most black neighborhoods were bounded by covenanted areas. The Washington Park Court Improvement Association changed its focus from neighborhood improvement projects, such as planting shrubs and cleaning streets, to upholding segregationist policies. When necessary, the organization resorted to violence to pursue its segregationist purpose, and between 1917 and 1921, bombs were used to discourage encroachment into majority white neighborhoods. The bombs were used at the residences of African Americans as well as the properties of real estate agents and bankers.

Eventually the term Black Belt included the region from 39th Street to 95th Street between the Dan Ryan Expressway and Lake Michigan. Since the 1930 United States census, the Grand Boulevard community area has been over 90% African American. In both the 1960 and 1990 Census, the community area was over 99% African American. As of the 2000 Census, the area was 98.2% African American and 0.8% Hispanic.
