= Washington Park Subdivision =

Historic subdivision in Chicago, Illinois

Coordinates: 41.783457°N 87.61219°W

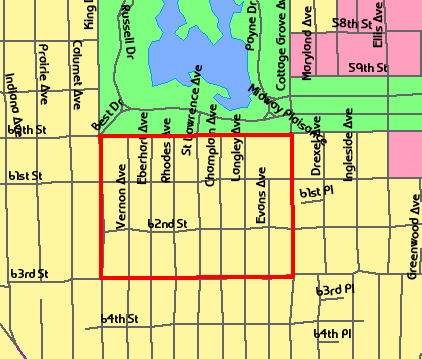
Washington Park Subdivision is south of Washington Park. (Chicago Park District - green, University of Chicago - lavender)

The Washington Park Subdivision is the name of the historic 3-city block by 4-city block subdivision in the northwest corner of the Woodlawn community area, on the South Side of Chicago in Illinois that stands in the place of the 19th century Washington Park Race Track. The area evolved as a redevelopment of the land previously occupied by the racetrack and became an exclusively white neighborhood, which included residential housing, amusement parks, and beer gardens.

During the late 1920s and 1930s, the area became the subject of racist and discriminatory twenty-year covenants (private real-estate agreements), which at first had been upheld by the United States Supreme Court but were later determined to be unenforceable by the court, beginning with a challenge in a seminal case brought by Carl Hansberry. The case is a vital part of legal studies and considered an important part of a broad class of histories. The play Raisin in the Sun is inspired in part by Lorraine Hansberry's struggles in this neighborhood.

== Location ==
The Washington Park community area occupies the Southern two-thirds of the former Washington Park Race Track. The area is a 4-city block (8 east-west half-blocks) by 3-city block area in northwest corner of the Woodlawn community area and bounded by Dr. Martin Luther King Drive to the west, South Cottage Grove Avenue to the East, East 60th Street to the North and East 63rd Street to the South. This area is directly south of Washington Park and both south and east of the Washington Park community area.

== Historical significance ==
Between 1884 and 1905, the race track occupied part of the area now known as Washington Park Subdivision. After the city outlawed horse race track betting, the area was redeveloped as a residential housing subdivision with neighborhood commercial recreation such as the White City amusement park that flourished until the Great Depression. The neighborhood also included a beer garden that was remodeled by Frank Lloyd Wright.

Between 1900 and 1934, the African American population in Chicago grew from 30,000 to 236,000. In this time, Chicago's demographics changed so that instead of having this population diluted in scattered places, it was concentrated in two large strips of land. The concentration was enforced by violence at first, but restrictive covenants became the preferred way to enforce segregation after a few decades.

When necessary, community organizations used violence to pursue their segregationist purposes, and between 1917 and 1921, bomb use discouraged encroachment into majority white neighborhoods. The bombs were used at the residences of African Americans as well as the properties of real estate agents and bankers. In 1919, African American banking magnate Jesse Binga, the owner of the first Chicago bank to be operated by African Americans, and the first African American who lived in the Washington Park Subdivision, endured five bombings of his home by angry whites. Binga lived on the block diagonally northwest of the northwest boundary of the subdivision at 5922 South Dr. Martin Luther King, Jr. Drive.

Although they were previously rare in Chicago, racially restrictive covenants among property owners that outlawed the purchase, lease, or occupation of their properties by African Americans became common in Chicago and throughout the United States in the 1920s, especially in the wake of the Great Migration. Local businessmen and the University of Chicago became alarmed at the prospect of poorer African Americans moving from the Black Belt due to a combination of racial succession and economic decline. In 1926, the United States Supreme Court upheld racially restrictive covenants in Corrigan v. Buckley (271 U.S. 323 (1926)). In 1927, the private Chicago Real Estate Board (CREB) sent representatives throughout the city to promote such covenants, which it viewed as a progressive alternative to violence. The board representatives provided model contracts drafted by the Chicago Plan Commission as part of their efforts. By 1928, the Hyde Park Herald reported that the covenants prevailed throughout the South Side, and 95% of the homes in the subdivision were covenanted. Most African American neighborhoods were bounded by covenanted areas since 85% of Chicago was covenanted.

== Legal issues ==
Between 1928 and 1940, the subdivision was a legal battleground. In 1928, landlords in the subdivision signed the covenants in which they agreed that they would not rent to non-whites. The language of the covenants state that no properties in the subdivision "...shall be sold, given, conveyed or leased to any negro or negroes, and no permission or license to use or occupy any part thereof shall be given to any negro except house servants or janitors or chauffeurs employed thereon..." The covenants were signed by "owners of land on the one or the other side of Evans, Langley, Champlain, St. Lawrence, Rhodes, Eberhart, Vernon and South Park Avenues, between 60th and 63rd Streets and on 60th, 61st and 62nd Streets between South Park and Cottage Grove Avenues" on September 30, 1927, and they were recorded at the Cook County Register of Deeds on February 1, 1928. They were intended to be valid and in force until January 1, 1948.

The Great Depression decreased white demand for the subdivision's properties. A few well-off African Americans convinced some owners to sell properties to them. The most famous case was that of Dr. James L. Hall, who rented a property located at 419 E. 60th St. from the white Issac Kleiman. In 1933, Olive Ida Burke (the wife of Mr. Burke—a future defendant in the famous Hansberry v. Lee case) sued Kleiman in the case now known as Burke v. Kleiman. The circuit court granted an injunction in favor of the plaintiffs (affirming the racial covenants); the injunction was upheld on appeals up to the Supreme Court of Illinois. The plaintiffs stipulated that as of 1928 more than 95% of the property owners signed the covenant. This stipulation was later proved false—only 54% had actually signed.

In 1937, Carl Hansberry purchased a property from James Joseph Burke located at 6140 South Rhodes. Anna M. Lee, and other promoters of the covenants, sued to prevent Hansberry's family from living in the neighborhood. This led to the case of Hansberry v. Lee, 311 U.S. 32 (1940). Defendants argued that the stipulation made previously in Burke v. Kleiman that more than 95% of the owners had signed the covenant was false and the case should be re-adjudicated. Plaintiffs, while admitting to the fact, contended that the principle of res judicata barred courts from rehearing the old arguments. The Illinois courts ruled in favor of plaintiffs. However the National Association for the Advancement of Colored People decided to represent the buyer in the United States Supreme Court. The case caught the attention of national real estate magazines and African American newspapers. The U. S. Supreme Court eventually reversed that ruling stating the application of res judicata in this case would violate Fourteenth Amendment. The play A Raisin in the Sun was inspired by Lorraine Hansberry's time in the neighborhood after her father won the repeal of restrictive covenants.

The result of Hansberry v. Lee led to racial succession. White tenants were often evicted to make way for higher-paying African American renters. By 1950, the subdivision was over 99 percent African American. The Hansberry case is a seminal case in civil procedure and class action legal studies. It is also considered an important study of African American, Chicago and legal history.

While the purchase case proceeded, some landlords subdivided properties and rented them to blacks at a premium. Some realtors began encouraging white families to move out so that they could rent properties to African Americans. Smaller property owners were pressed to sell to realtors or directly to African Americans because the neighborhood was undergoing a racial transformation. The conditions of this neighborhood are described in a section of Black Metropolis by St. Clair Drake and Horace Roscoe Cayton.

The Supreme Court ruling and several similar rulings led to the racial transformation of the Woodlawn and Hyde Park community areas. Political futures were determined by positions taken on this issue. Future five-term Mayor of Chicago Richard J. Daley ran for Cook County Sheriff in 1946 as a progressive anti-covenant candidate. Eventually, in Shelley v. Kraemer, 334 U.S. 1 (1948), which was argued by Thurgood Marshall, the U. S. Supreme Court declared restrictive covenants in general unenforceable.
