= Schulze Baking Company Plant =

- U.S. National Register of Historic Places
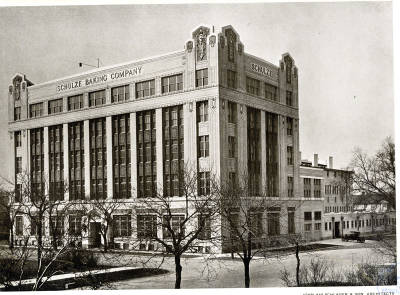
- Schulze Baking Company Factory (c.1914-15)

- Location within Greater Chicago
- Location: 40 East Garfield Boulevard (Garfield Boulevard and Wabash Avenue); Chicago, Illinois
- Coordinates: 41°47′44″N 87°37′29″W
- Built: 1913
- Architects: John Ahlschlager & Son
- NRHP reference No.: 82000393
- Added to NRHP: November 12, 1982

Schulze Baking Company Plant is a factory building located on the South Side of Chicago, Illinois, United States. It is located at 40 East Garfield Boulevard (also described as 55th Street and Wabash Avenue) in the Washington Park community area in Cook County. Built in 1914, the building was listed on the National Register of Historic Places on November 12, 1982. Originally built for the Schulze Baking Company, it was the home of the Hostess Brands' Butternut Bread until 2004.

The building features a terra cotta exterior with ornamentation that pays tribute to Louis Sullivan. The original flooring is made of reinforced concrete. In the early 21st century, the building fell into a state of disrepair. Plans to rehabilitate the building into a data center have failed to materialize, and the Plant's future remains uncertain. In 2024, Preservation Chicago listed it as among the city's most at-risk buildings for demolition.

== Location and function ==
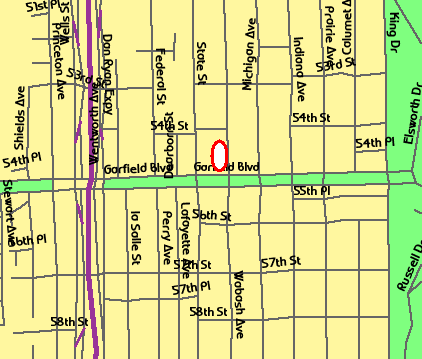
Schulze Plant location (Chicago Park District - green, Dan Ryan Expressway - purple)

The building is located between the western edge of Washington Park and the Dan Ryan Expressway along a section of Garfield Boulevard that formerly hosted prominent businesses, including Schulze and the Wanzer Milk Company. The area has suffered from economic decay and crime during the second half of the 20th century. One of the few significant remaining businesses in the old Black Belt during this time was Hostess, which still used the building to make Butternut Bread.

== Baking company ==
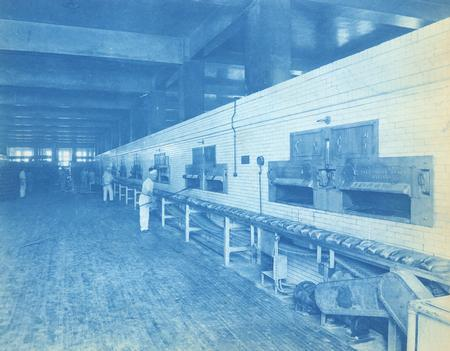
The Schulze Baking Company's Jeffrey Apron Conveyor. (1920)

Schulze, with its signature Butternut Bread, eventually became Interstate Bakeries Corporation/Hostess Brands. The business was once Chicago's largest wholesale business entity. Although, according to Form 10-K filings by the Interstate Bakeries Corporation with the United States Securities and Exchange Commission, the Schulze Baking Company was not formed until 1927, many records contradict this claim. Historical accounts of Chicago claim that Paul Schulze, 1910-11 president of the National Association of Master Bakers, started the Schulze Baking Company in 1893 with his brothers. Interstate's own company history even confirms the 1893 beginning of Schulze.

In 1912, prior to the construction of the plant, the company had four baking plants throughout the city of Chicago and general offices in the Chicago Stock Exchange Building on LaSalle Street in the Chicago Loop. In the 1910s, the company had extensive legal battles regarding protecting its trademarks.

In 1921, Paul Schulze sold control of the company to Ralph Leroy Nafziger. In 1930, Nafziger announced the formation of Interstate Bakeries through the merger of Schulze Baking and Western Bakeries of Los Angeles to form Interstate Bakeries. Schulze and Western continued to maintain their own separate companies under the Interstate umbrella until 1937, when Schulze formally became Interstate.

Paul Schulze went on to operate small bakeries elsewhere under the name of Schulze and Burch Biscuit Company.

== Architecture ==
The building is a white terra cotta structure designed by John Ahlschlager in 1914 for the Schulze Baking Company. The terra cotta walls were five storeys high. The building featured blue lettering, foliated cornice ornamentation, and stringcourses of rosettes. The building uses 700 windows grouped to complement the ornamentation's allusion to themes of nature and purity. The ornamentation is considered abstract, Sullivanesque and modern. The company used Apron conveyor manufactured by the Jeffrey Manufacturing Company of Columbus, Ohio. A lengthy low industrial complex extends northward behind the main five-story building.

The structure has a flat concrete slab floor with four-way reinforcement designed to support 300 pounds per square inch (2,100 kPa). The dimensions of the building 298 feet 4 inches (90.93 m) by 160 feet (49 m) and it is composed of floor space segmented into 17 feet 6 inches (5.33 m) by 20 feet (6.1 m). The second floor is 9 inches (23 cm) thick except in the 7 feet 6 inches (2.29 m) square surrounding each column where it is 14 inches (36 cm) thick.

As of late 2008, the building was showing signs of wear, disrepair, and neglect. At least one terra cotta cornice was missing, and the building had numerous walkway coverings to protect passersby from falling debris such as further terra cotta loss. One side wall was propped up with wood beams at 45-degree angles. In addition, the building had some graffiti markings. However, developer Ghian Foreman stated in February 2016 that the rehabilitation of the former Plant into a data center, to be called the Midway Technology Center, was on schedule for operation in 2017. The adaptive reuse project allegedly involved the investment of more than $130 million. However, Foreman sold the building in 2021, before rehabilitating the building, and its future remains uncertain.
