= Washington Park (community area), Chicago =

Community area in Chicago, Illinois

Washington Park
- Community area
- Community Area 40 - Washington Park
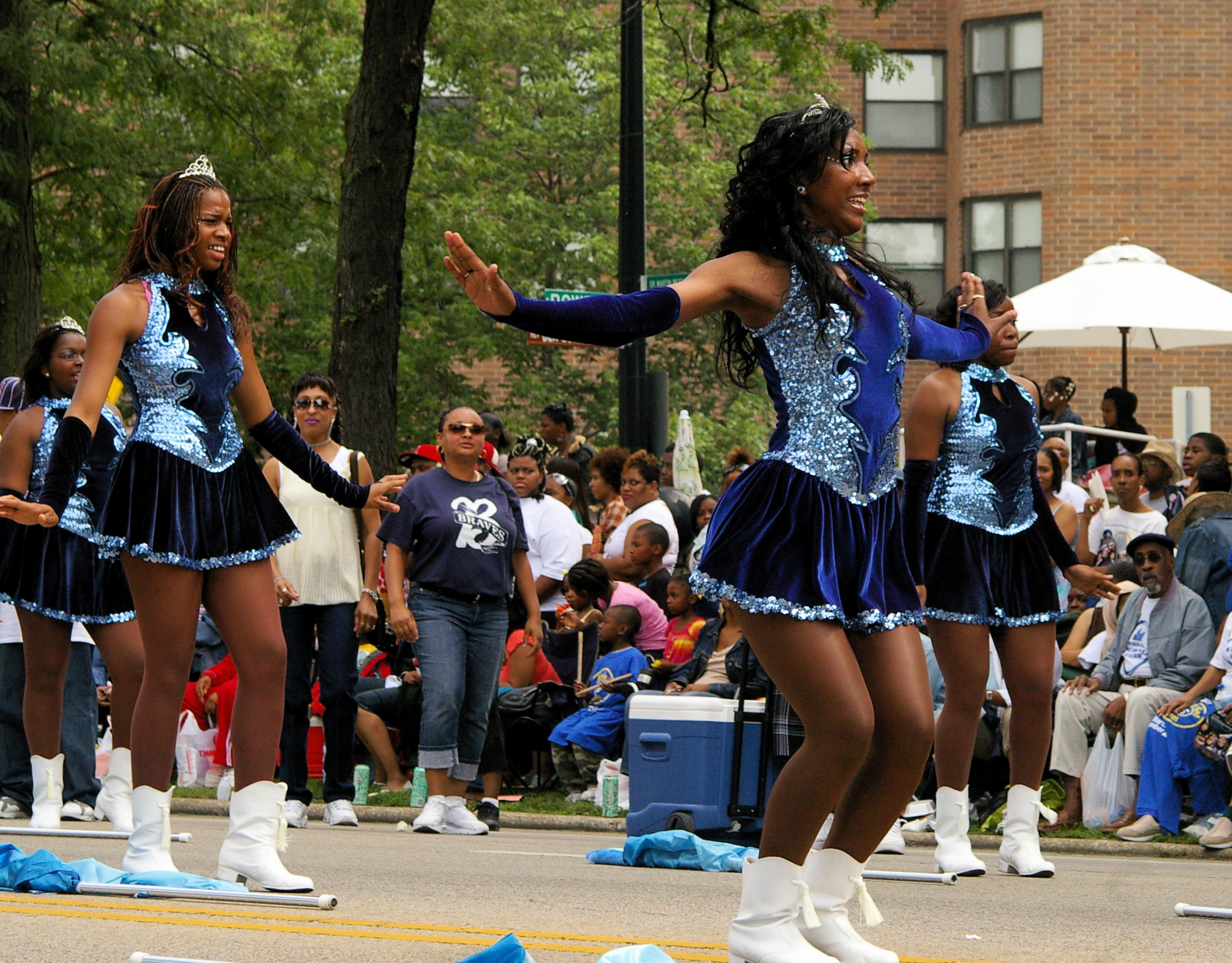
- The Bud Billiken Parade and Picnic is the United States' largest African American parade.

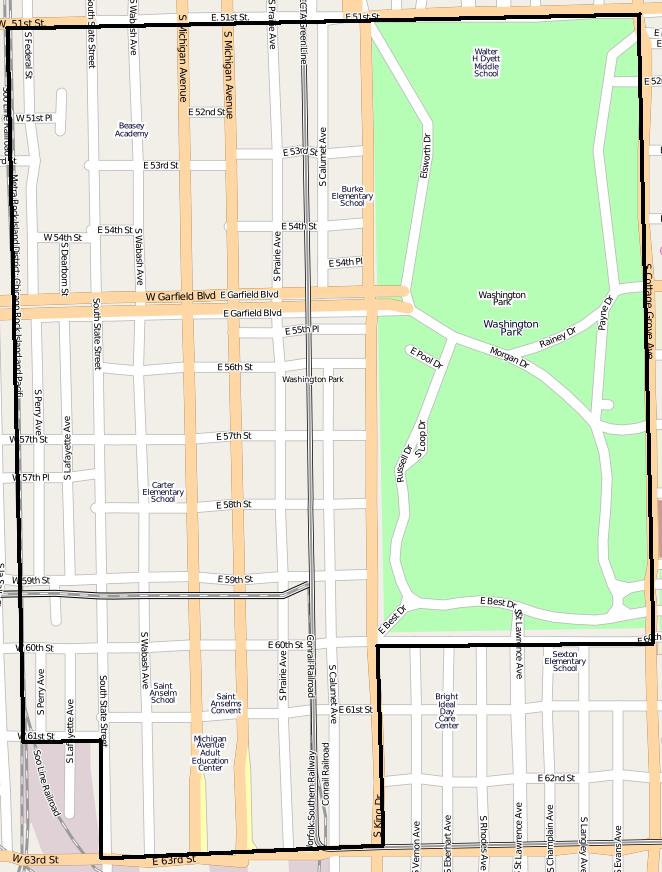
- Streetmap

- Location within the city of Chicago
- Coordinates: 41°47.4′N 87°37.2′W
- Country: United States
- State: Illinois
- County: Cook
- City: Chicago
- Neighborhoods: List: Washington Park; The Robert Taylor Homes; Englewood

Area
  - Total: 1.48 sq mi (3.83 km^{2})

Population (2024)
  - Total: 12,313
  - Density: 8,330/sq mi (3,210/km^{2})

Demographics 2024
  - White: 2.0%
  - Black: 91.9%
  - Hispanic: 2.9%
  - Asian: 0.1%
  - Other: 3.1%

Educational Attainment 2024
  - High School Diploma or Higher: 86.2%
  - Bachelor's Degree or Higher: 26.6%
- Time zone: UTC-6 (CST)
  - Summer (DST): UTC-5 (CDT)
- ZIP Codes: parts of 60609, 60615, 60621, 60637
- Median household income: $27,458
- Source: U.S. Census, Record Information Services

Washington Park is one of the 77 community areas of Chicago in Illinois, United States. It is located on the South Side of Chicago.

The community area includes the 372 acre (1.5 km^{2}) park of the same name, stretching east-west from Cottage Grove Avenue to the Dan Ryan Expressway, and north-south from 51st Street to 63rd. It is home to the DuSable Museum of African American History. The park was the proposed site of the Olympic Stadium and the Olympic Aquatics Center in Chicago's bid to host the 2016 Summer Olympics.

It and surrounding neighborhoods have gone through notable and often turbulent racial transitions.

== History ==
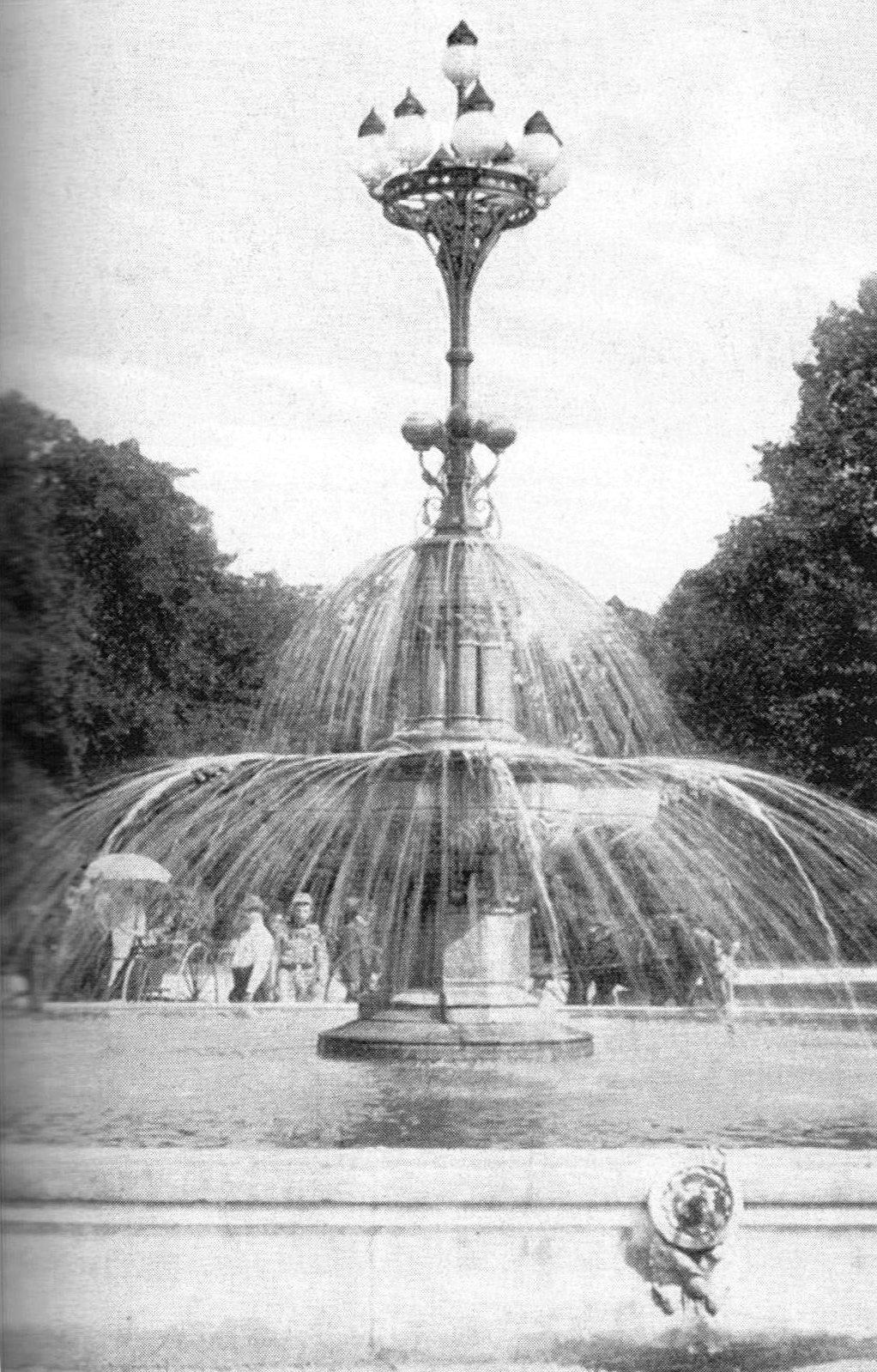
Horse drinking fountains like this Grand Boulevard Park entrance one were common. 1800s and early 1900s park visitors commonly arrived in horse-drawn carriages.

In the mid-to-late 19th century, a large number of Irish and German railroad workers and meatpackers made Washington Park home. There was a sprinkling of African American residents in the working-class district south of Garfield Boulevard/55th Street. Affluent American-born European Americans settled the wide north-south avenues that provided a direct route into the Loop 7 miles (11 km) to the north. Cable cars, the Chicago 'L' and wide boulevards contributed to late 19th century prosperity. The wide avenues, especially Grand Boulevard (now named Dr. Martin Luther King Jr. Memorial Drive), provided popular locations for mansions and grand apartments built by many wealthy Chicagoans.

The park in this community area was named for President George Washington in 1880. In the 1920s, the University of Chicago created the community area system of city subdivision with the current names that continue to be used today. The community areas although not formally adopted by the United States Census Bureau are largely consistent with census tract boundaries. The Washington Park community area and its census tracts have been unchanged.

=== Changing demographics ===
Historical population
Census	Pop.	Note	%±
1930	44,016		—
1940	52,736		19.8%
1950	56,856		7.8%
1960	43,690		−23.2%
1970	46,024		5.3%
1980	31,935		−30.6%
1990	19,425		−39.2%
2000	14,146		−27.2%
2010	11,717		−17.2%
2020	12,707		8.4%

A turn-of-the-20th-century housing construction boom along with increases in the African American population of the midwest during the Great Migration resulted in the movement of lower-income and predominantly African American Chicagoans southward. Soon, the European-American inhabitants mostly left the area, in a phenomenon often termed "white flight". The transition was rapid and marked with conflicts such as the Race Riot of 1919. Some white Protestants left to form an exclusive residential community in the South Shore community area. In 1906 they formed the South Shore Country Club, which excluded Black people and Jews from membership.

The area rapidly changed from European American to African-American in the 1920s. By 1930, the population was only 7.8% white. By 1960, the population was 0.5% white. From 1950 to 2000 the total population of the neighborhood declined from 57,000 to 14,146. This population decline is partly due to initiatives of the Chicago Land Clearance Commission, who acted under the 1955 Amendment to the Blighted Areas Redevelopment Act, which allowed redevelopment authorities that acquired land by condemnation or otherwise to redevelop such lands for non-residential uses. A good example of the Land Clearing commission activities is the Lake Meadows Park to the north of Washington Park. The failure of the evolution of industry and commerce in the community, white flight and land redevelopment for non-residential use combined led to population decline.

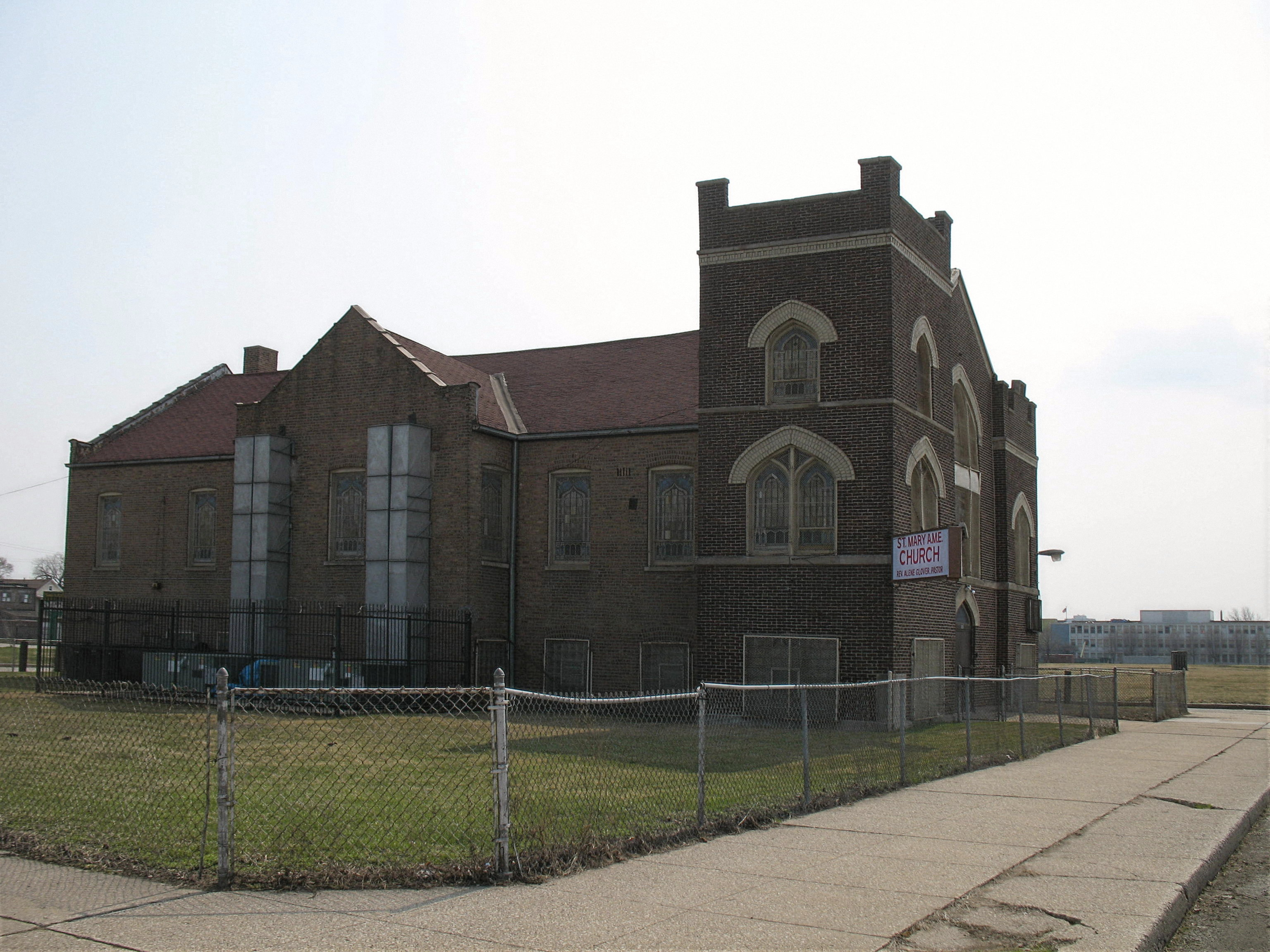
St. Mary's African Methodist Episcopal Church, established in 1897, is Washington Park's oldest black congregation

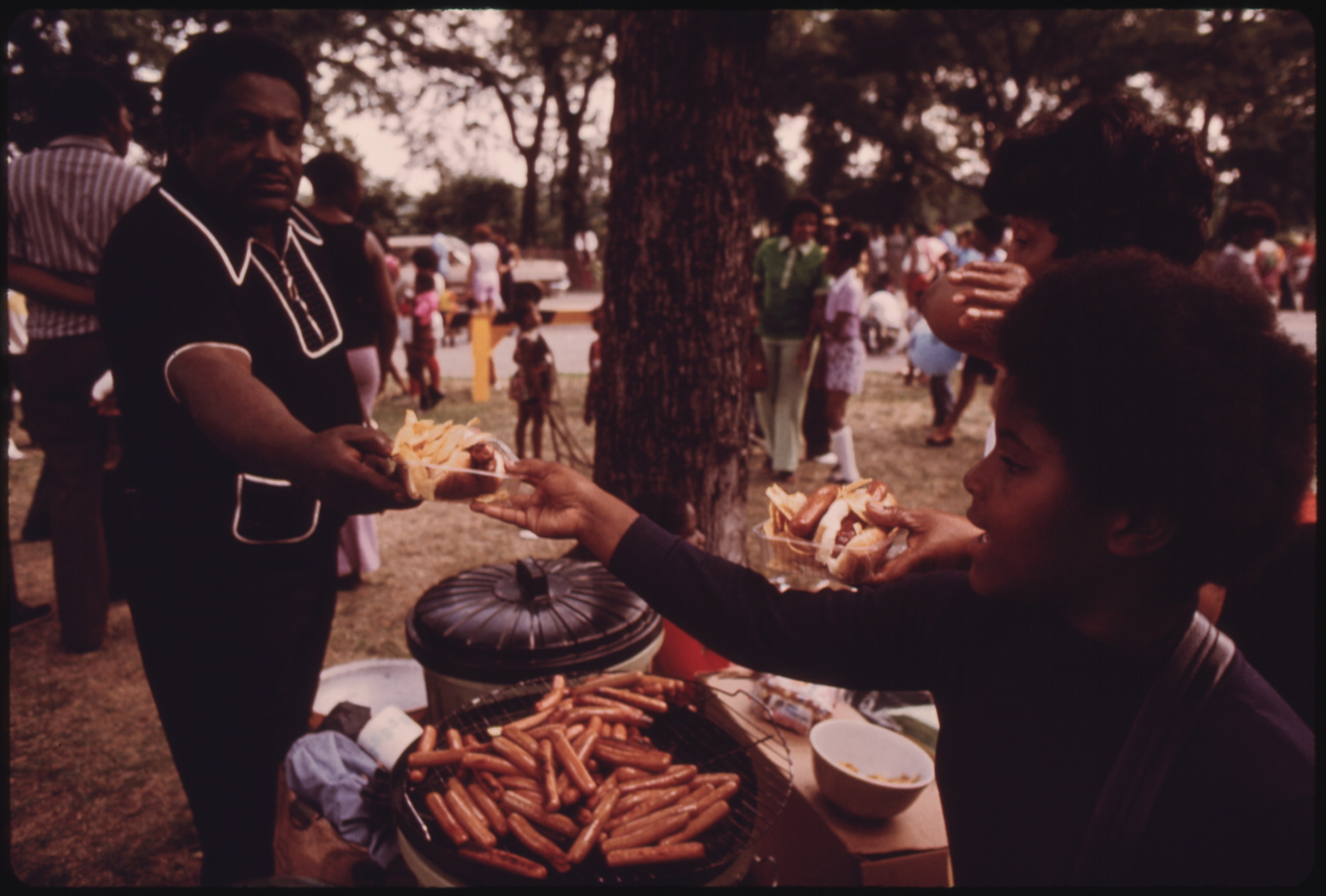
Picnic in Washington Park, 1973. Photo by John H. White

== Religion ==
Religion and worship are cornerstones of the South Side communities. The nearby hub of Bronzeville at 47th and Dr. Martin Luther King, Jr. Drive (known as King Drive and formerly Grand Boulevard) was a cultural hub of the neighborhood that fostered a cultural identity. In keeping with the racial transformation, the cultural and religious institutions, including those of Irish Catholics, Greek Orthodoxy and the Jewish faith, converted to African American institutions.

== Structures ==
The neighborhood once contained many public housing complexes including about a third of the nation's largest, the Robert Taylor Homes. The Taylor homes have been demolished because of the socioeconomic problems that they perpetuated. The area has minimal industry or commerce at the current time. The other property on the NRHP in the area is the Schulze Baking Company Plant.

The DuSable Museum of African American History, founded in 1961, moved to Washington Park in 1973. It is a Washington Park landmark and one of the largest African American museums in the country.

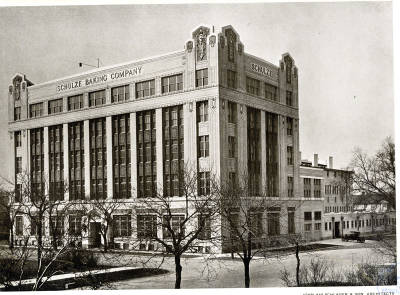
Schulze Baking Company Plant has been listed on the National Register of Historic Places since November 12, 1982

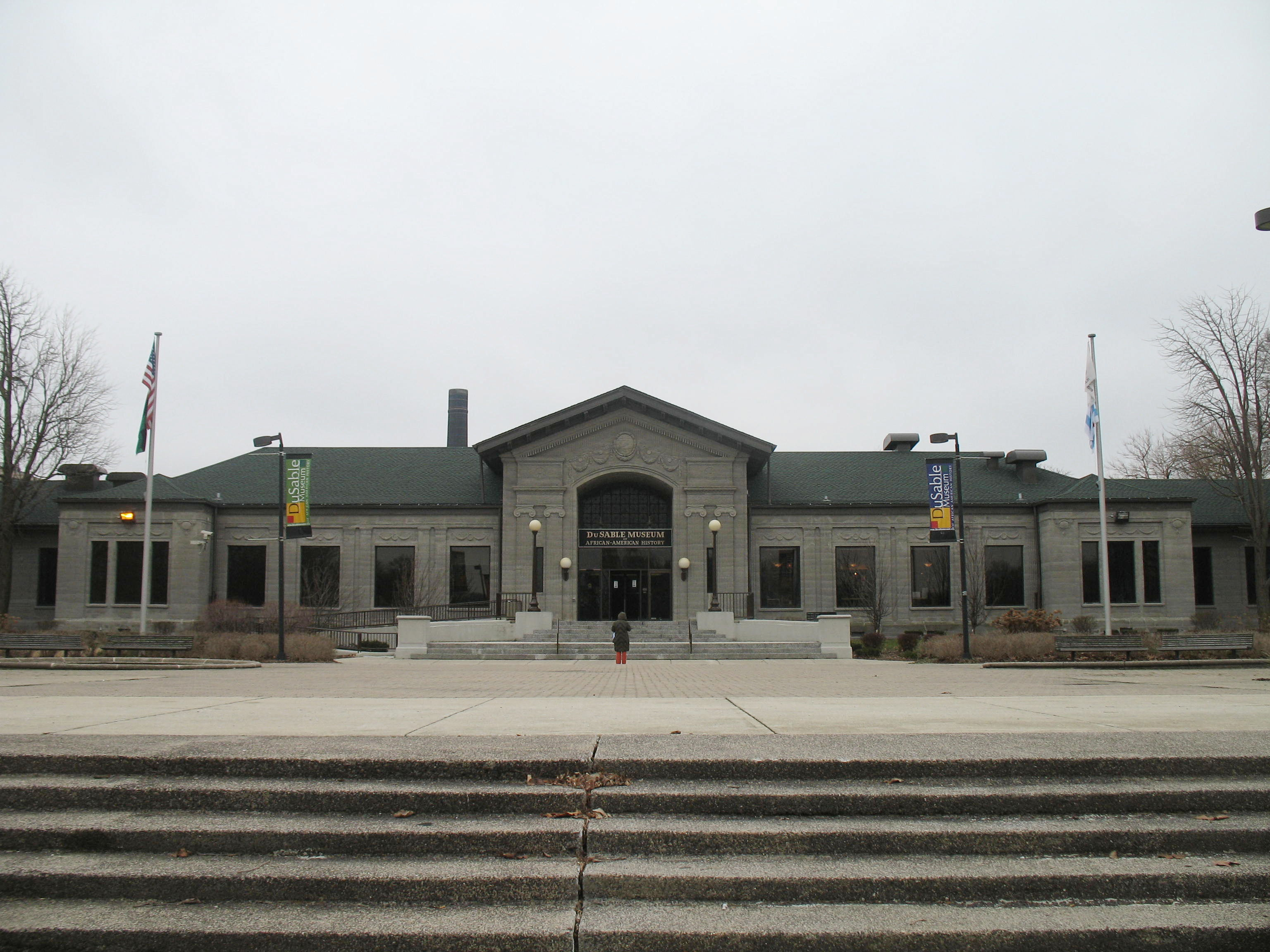
DuSable Museum of African American History, located near 57th Street and Cottage Grove Avenue.

=== Namesakes ===
Several nearby regions and institutions use Washington Park in their name. Immediately to the south, Washington Park Subdivision exists where Washington Park Race Track once stood. One city block to the north, Washington Park Court District is a neighborhood that has become a Chicago Landmark.

== In literature and culture ==
The Washington Park neighborhood has been the setting for works of popular literature. James T. Farrell's Studs Lonigan trilogy is set in Washington Park. In Richard Wright's novel Native Son, Bigger Thomas drives the drunken Jan Erlone and Mary Dalton around Washington Park, as the two embrace.

In addition to hosting the DuSable Museum, the park hosts Fountain of Time, the world's earliest concrete finished art work.

Conditions in Washington Park Subdivision is are described in a section of Black Metropolis by St. Clair Drake and Horace Roscoe Cayton.

The play Raisin in the Sun was inspired by Lorraine Hansberry's time in the neighborhood after her father won the repeal of racial covenants. In 2010, the Hansberry house, the red brick three-flat at 6140 S. Rhodes Avenue which they bought in 1937, was up for landmark status before the Chicago City Council's Committee on Historical Landmarks Preservation.

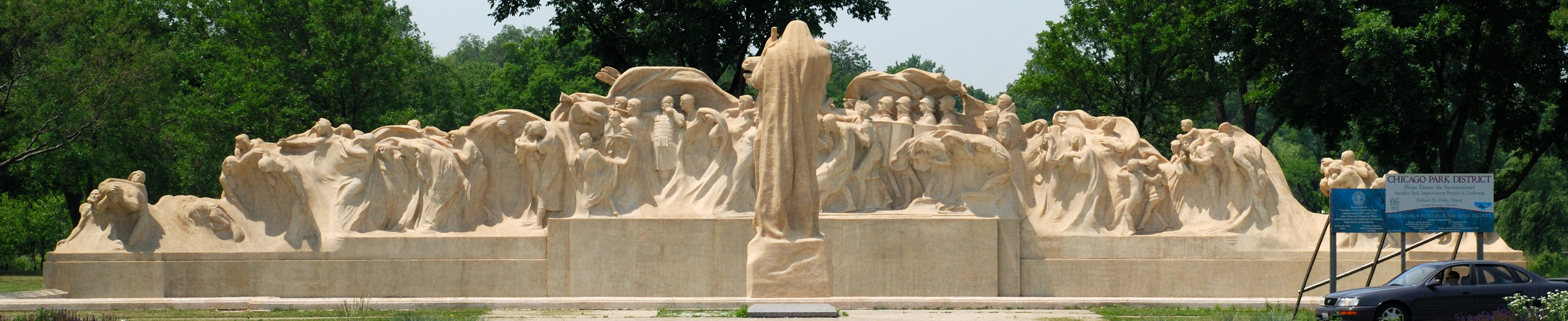
Fountain of Time is the world's earliest concrete finished art work

== Notable people ==
- Dayvon D. Bennett (1994–2020), alias "King Von", rapper and songwriter
- Jesse Binga (1865–1950), founder of the first privately owned African American bank in Chicago. He moved to the then-white neighborhood in 1917.
- Chief Keef (born 1995), rapper and record producer.
- Grover C. Nash (1911–1970), aviator and first Black pilot to fly mail for the United States Postal Service. He resided at 6109 South Calumet Avenue at the time of his feat.
- Cecil A. Partee (1921–1994), 31st and 33rd President of the Illinois Senate. He resided at 6032 South Michigan Avenue while serving as a member of the Illinois House of Representatives.
- Deval Patrick (born 1956), 71st Governor of Massachusetts (2007–2015). He was raised in Washington Park.
- Harry Mark Petrakis (1923–2021), novelist known for depictions of Greek-American life. He was a childhood resident of Washington Park.
- Melvin Van Peebles (1932–2021), actor, filmmaker, playwright, novelist and composer. He was a childhood resident of the Washington Park community area at 58th and Calumet.
- Michelle Obama (born 1964) Former First Lady of the United States.

== See also ==
- Washington Park (Chicago park)
