= Uptown Theatre (Chicago) =

Movie palace, concert venue in Illinois, US

- Balaban and Katz Uptown Theatre
- U.S. National Register of Historic Places
- Chicago Landmark
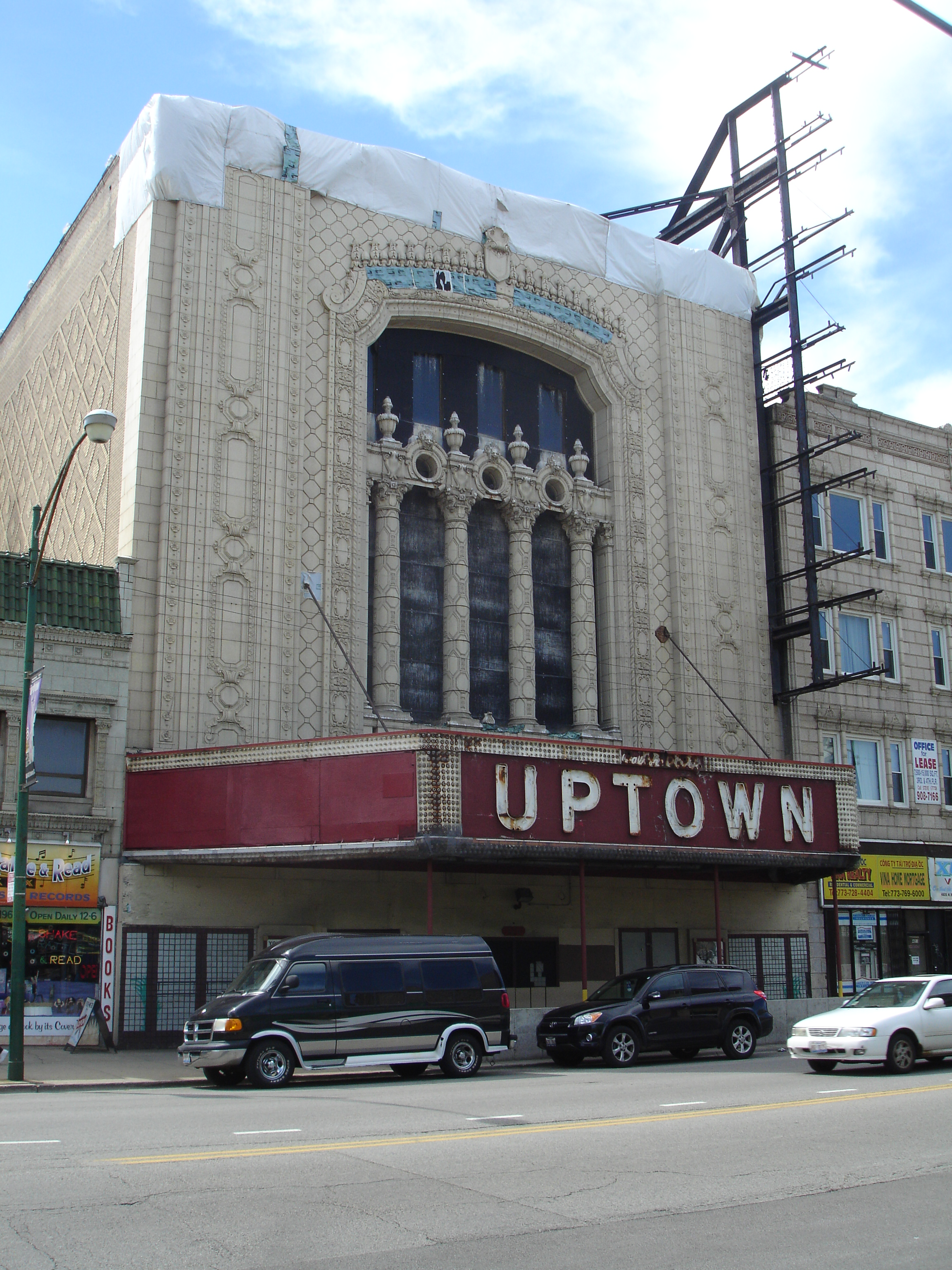
- Uptown Theatre, 2011
- Location: 4816 N. Broadway, Chicago, Illinois
- Coordinates: 41°58′11″N 87°39′36″W
- Built: 1925; 101 years ago
- Architect: C.W. Rapp, George Rapp
- Architectural style: Tudor Revival, Mission/Spanish Revival
- NRHP reference No.: 86003181

Significant dates
- Added to NRHP: November 20, 1986
- Designated CHICL: October 2, 1991

Uptown Theatre (also known as Balaban and Katz Uptown Theatre) is a former movie palace and concert venue located in the Uptown neighborhood of Chicago, Illinois. Designed by Rapp and Rapp and built by Paschen Bros. contractors, it is one of the many movie palaces built by the Balaban & Katz theatre chain run by A. J. Balaban, his brother Barney Balaban, and their partner Sam Katz.

The largest remaining in Chicago, it boasts 4,381 seats and its interior volume is said to be larger than any other movie palace in the United States, including Radio City Music Hall in New York. It occupies over 46,000 square feet (4,300 m^{2}) of land at the corner of Lawrence Avenue and Broadway in Chicago's Uptown Entertainment District. The mammoth theater has an ornate five-story entrance lobby, formerly with an eight-story facade.

Its decor was opulent, reflecting more than just aesthetic choices. Architect George Rapp declared, "These are not impractical attempts at showing off. Here is a shrine to democracy where there are not privileged patrons. The wealthy rub elbows with the poor -- and are the better for this contact."

The Uptown Theater has been closed since 1981. While restoration was often discussed in the following decades, and several concentrated efforts were made to promote the Uptown's restoration, no such efforts were successful, leaving the theater in disrepair. In 2018, plans to renovate the theatre were announced, but those plans fell through in 2021 in part due to the COVID-19 pandemic.

== History ==
=== Grand opening ===
The Uptown Theatre opened its doors August 18, 1925, billed as "An Acre of Seats in a Magic City". The Grand Opening of the Uptown Theatre was accompanied by a "Central Uptown Parade" of over 200 floats and a grand ball at Harmon's Arcadia in Uptown. Over 12,000 people stood in line to be ticketholders in the very first audience. Several women collapsed because of exhaustion.

=== Uptown Theatre staff and stage shows ===
The theater opened with a staff of more than 130 people, including a full-time 34 piece orchestra, a nurse, firemen and others. Elaborate stage show productions would accompany each movie, unique in that the elaborate stage shows would follow the theme of the movie. Other chains had basic Vaudeville acts to keep patrons entertained before the movie. The Uptown Theatre is on several landmark and historic registers.

=== A half century of movies ===
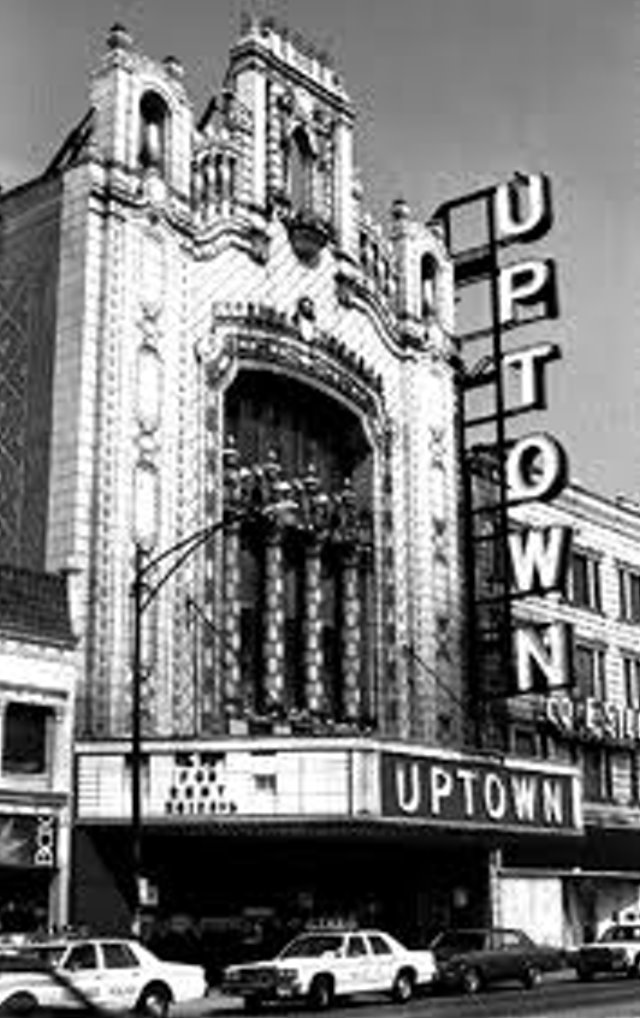
Uptown Theatre circa 1980

In a cost-cutting move, it was decided to end stage shows at the Uptown (though they were revived briefly in 1949). However, movies were still shown there; their popularity continued during the 1950s and 1960s. Notably, during the same period, the television show Queen for a Day was filmed at the Uptown with a live audience.

In the late 1960s and early 1970s, movie crowds dwindled; concurrently, the Uptown area was experiencing a decline of retail sales.

=== New life as a music venue ===
Between 1974 and 1976, the Uptown was partially restored as a movie theater. Under the direction of manager Richard Davis, an arts management intern from Chicago City-Wide College, the staff was terminated from Plitt Theaters after complaints of massive internal theft. Davis continued repairs and restoration and had considerable success booking movies such as The Godfather and action films.

In 1976, Davis revived the Uptown as a major concert venue after more restoration. He coordinated local and national acts and booked the Grateful Dead seventeen times between January 30, 1978 and February 28, 1981. The J. Geils Band was the last band to play at the theater.

=== Since 1981 closure ===
Since the winter of 1981, the Uptown Theatre has been closed to regular events. Then-owner Plitt Theatres had inadvertently turned off the heat, causing a frozen water pipe to burst. This resulted in extensive damage to the theater's interior. In subsequent years, deferred maintenance and vandalism led to further debilitation of the structure and ornamentation, both inside and out.

However, during the same time period, the Uptown has been featured in films such as the Academy Award-nominated Ron Howard movie Backdraft, the Julia Roberts and Nick Nolte movie I Love Trouble, and the John Hughes - Chris Columbus sequel Home Alone 2: Lost in New York.

In the 1990s, the theatre lobby was host to the "Hearts Party" (a gay "circuit" party), which raised money for an AIDS charity. In 2016, the theater was used for the music video for Regina Spektor's single "Black and White".

=== Current restoration efforts ===
In 1990, a group of preservationists persuaded the then-owners to donate important interior fixtures from the Uptown, specifically to be used in future preservation and restoration projects. Through the efforts of civil engineer Curt Mangel, it was arranged for the fixtures to be stored by wealthy collector Jasper Sanfilippo at his estate in Barrington Hills, Illinois.

In 2006, the exterior was extensively secured and terra cotta pieces were cataloged and stored for future restoration efforts. A May 21, 2007 article in Crain's Chicago Business described the Uptown Theatre as "suddenly a hot property," as three national entertainment companies were in competition to purchase, restore and reopen the venue. The theater was purchased through a judicial sale July 29, 2008, by JAM Productions for $3.2 million. JAM, the sole bidder for the theater, finalized its acquisition in court on August 18, 2008. In August 2013, the fourth installment of the Transformers series began filming scenes in the theater.

In 2018, it was announced that $75 million had been set aside to restore the theater. Construction was expected to begin during the summer of 2019. However, work never began due to a lack of investors, and the developer dropped out of the project in 2021. Jerry Mickelson, chief executive officer of JAM Productions, said in 2024 that he still hoped to see the building restored and estimated that it would take $140 million. Mickelsen said in 2025 that he planned to seek city funding for the Uptown's renovation. He said the project, whose cost had risen to $200 million by 2026, would have to be primarily funded by public sources, but the Chicago government said that his request was excessive.

Orchestra Level view 2026

The theater was open for public viewing during Open House Chicago 2026, marking the first time the structure had been open to the general public since the theater's closure. This event drew thousands of visitors.

== Preservation advocacy ==
Friends of the Uptown, founded in 1998, is a diverse advocacy group of friends, neighbors, historians, and theatre enthusiasts that supports restoring the venue to its position as an entertainment and economic asset for the Uptown neighborhood.

A 2006 documentary by filmmakers John Pappas and Michael Bisberg, Uptown: Portrait of a Palace, published by Compass Rose, explores the history of the theater and why the largest and one of the most elaborate movie palaces in the country has been vacant since 1981. Historic photos are juxtaposed with recent film footage to show how the building has survived the past 80 years. The film premiered at the Portage Theatre in Chicago in June 2006 and has been featured on Chicago's public television station WTTW. Uptown: Portrait of a Palace won in the "Best Documentary" category at the 11th Annual Flicker Fest.

The documentary includes interviews with a number of sources close to the theatre: Alderman Mary Ann Smith; local business owner Ric Addy; Rene Rabiella, whose father once owned the theatre; Andy Pierce, volunteer and founding member of Friends of the Uptown; volunteer engineer Bob Boin; caretaker Dave Syfczak; Joanne Asala and Robert Calhoun, theatre activists and co-founders of a history Web site; and Joseph DuciBella, founding member of the Theatre Historical Society and author of Theatres of Chicago, to highlight the plight of historic architecture across the country.

The preservation group Landmarks Illinois included the Uptown on their list of "Ten Most Endangered Historic Places" in 1996, 2001, 2010, and 2014.

On August 16, 2025, in honor of the building's 100th anniversary, an Uptown Community Portrait was shot in front of the theater as a re-creation of the building's 1925 grand opening photo. A book about the theater was published in 2025 to mark its 100th anniversary.

== Literature ==
The Uptown Theatre is featured on the cover of The Chicago Movie Palaces of Balaban and Katz by David Balaban (Arcadia Publishing).

== Notable performers ==
- Larry Adler
- The Allman Brothers Band
- Average White Band
- Agnes Ayres
- Count Basie
- Edgar Bergen
- Monte Blue
- Boston
- Peabo Bryson
- Jerry Colonna
- Jackie Coogan
- Alice Cooper
- Elvis Costello
- Bing Crosby
- Cheap Trick
- Cheech & Chong
- Charlie Daniels Band
- Dire Straits
- Electric Light Orchestra
- Duke Ellington
- Ruth Etting
- Foreigner
- Peter Frampton
- Peter Gabriel
- Jerry Garcia Band
- Judy Garland
- Genesis
- Gentle Giant
- Benny Goodman
- Betty Grable
- Grateful Dead
- Hall & Oates
- J. Geils Band
- Rick James
- Johnnie Johnston
- Kansas
- The Kinks
- The Knack
- Bob Marley & The Wailers
- The Marx Brothers
- Steve Miller Band
- Olsen and Johnson
- Robert Palmer
- Graham Parker
- Jean-Luc Ponty
- Prince
- Mae Questel
- The Ramones
- Lou Reed
- Renaissance
- Charles “Buddy” Rogers
- Roxy Music
- Todd Rundgren
- Leon Russell
- Santana
- Penny Singleton
- Sister Sledge
- Southside Johnny & The Asbury Jukes
- Bruce Springsteen & the E Street Band
- Rod Stewart
- Squeeze
- Supertramp
- Thin Lizzy
- The Tubes
- The Marshall Tucker Band
- Paul Whiteman
- Frank Zappa

== Gallery ==
Lobby detail

Mezzanine overlook

Lobby deterioration detail

Grand staircase

Front row, orchestra level

Grand Lobby

Ticketing lobby deterioration detail
