= Swift House =

Historic house in Illinois, United States

- U.S. National Register of Historic Places
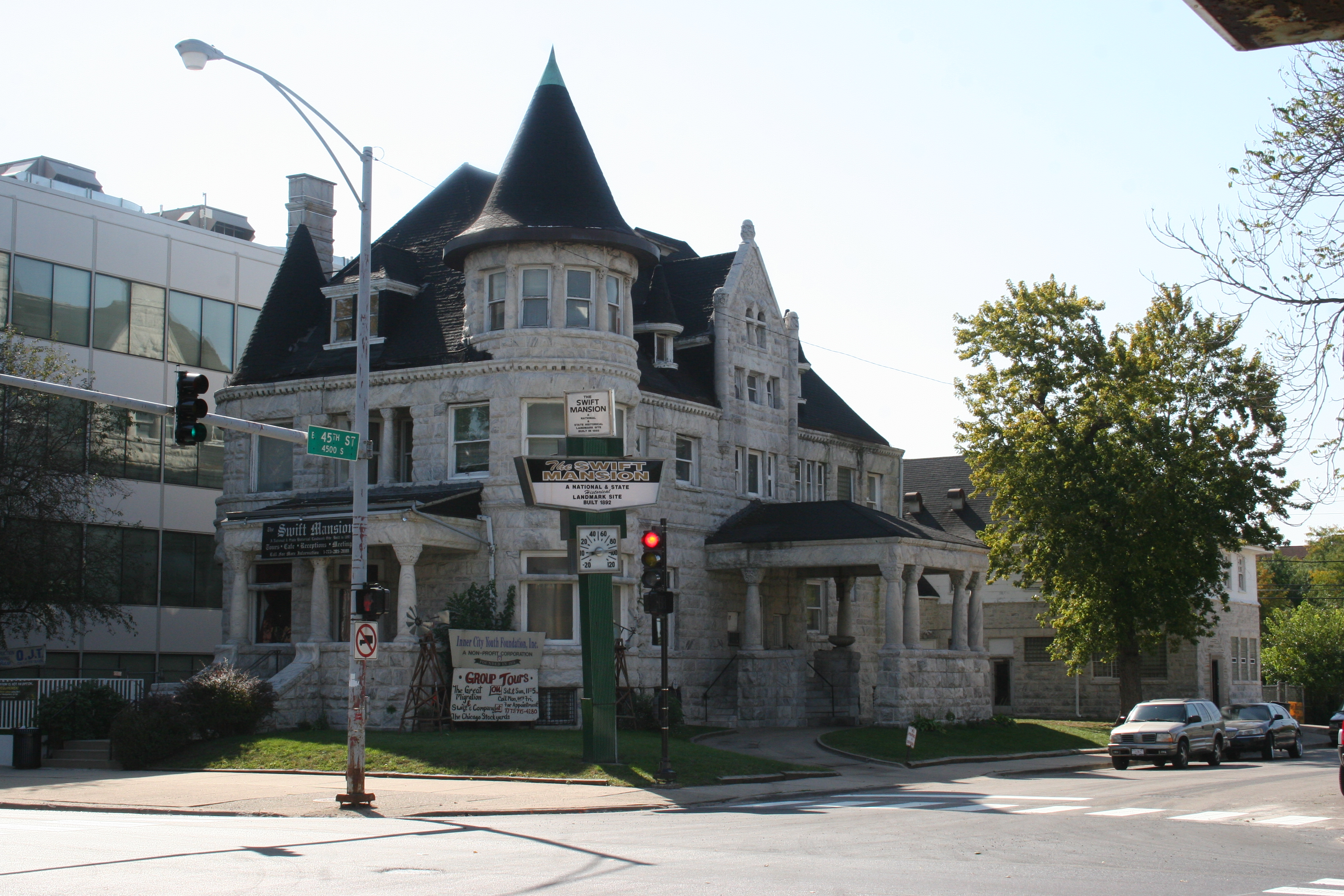

- Location within Chicago metropolitan area Location within Illinois Location within the United States
- Location: 4500 S. Michigan Ave., Chicago, Illinois
- Coordinates: 41°48′47″N 87°37′24″W
- Area: less than one acre
- Built: 1892
- Architect: Willett & Pashley
- Architectural style: Richardsonian Romanesque
- NRHP reference No.: 78001133
- Added to NRHP: June 9, 1978

The Swift House is a historic house at 4500 S. Michigan Avenue in the Grand Boulevard community area of Chicago, Illinois. The house was built in 1892 for Edward Morris and his wife Helen Swift Morris. Both of the owners had close ties to Chicago's meatpacking industry; Edward was the president of Morris & Company, while Helen was the daughter of Gustavus Franklin Swift, the founder of Swift & Company. The Richardsonian Romanesque home was most likely designed by Chicago architects Willett & Pashley. Its design includes a rusticated stone exterior, porches supported by stone columns, a dentillated cornice, and a turret and stone gable projecting from the roof. In addition to being a home for several different owners, the house has also served as a funeral home and as the headquarters of the Chicago Urban League.

The house was added to the National Register of Historic Places on June 9, 1978.

On December 3, 2023, the building was severely damaged in a fire.
