= Joseph DuciBella =

Joseph R. DuciBella A.S.I.D. (April 17, 1945 – June 29, 2007) was an interior designer, founding member of the Theatre Historical Society of America (1969), author, and noted architectural historian.

== Biography ==
Born and raised on the West Side of Chicago, Joseph R. DeciBella's interest in theatres began as he watched the demolition of the Paradise Theatre. This experience allowed him to observe how large theatres were constructed and led to his desire to be an architect. He later studied under the noted German-American architect Ludwig Mies van der Rohe at the Illinois Institute of Technology. Eventually, he pursued interior design instead of architecture. He graduated from the Chicago Academy of Fine Art with degrees in Interior Design. He went on to become an interior designer (residential, commercial, and theatrical) and had his own design firm for more than 25 years.

He became widely known as an important American theatre historian and published several books both in the United States and in Europe. His Theatres of Chicago (1973) is still one of the only comprehensive books on the theatres of Chicago. He also penned many articles for the publications of the Theatre Historical Society of America, Marquee and Annual, covering a wide range of topics. He also wrote the foreword for the book The Chicago Movie Palaces of Balaban & Katz (2006). His forthcoming and final work, mentioned in Robert Charles Marsh's 150 Years of Opera in Chicago (2006) as The Theatres of Chicago: The Complete Illustrated History, covers the history of nearly all the theatres in Chicago from the 1840s to the present, but remains unpublished in its entirety.

He was a member of many organizations, including the American Theatre Organ Society, The Organ Historical Society, Chicago Area Theatre Organ Enthusiasts, the Friends of the Wanamaker Organ and many more. He received many honors, commendations and awards in the Interior Design and Theatre History fields. He was also one of Chicago's most respected architectural historians and led many city tours of Chicago's legendary architecture and was a leading figure in its preservation. He fought to save culturally important buildings such as the Chicago Theatre, the Congress Theater, and many others, including the Uptown Theatre, a movie palace still in need of a renovation plan. He also worked to have the Chicago Wicker Park neighborhood designated a Chicago Landmark District. He appears in the documentary: Uptown: Portrait of a Palace.

He died peacefully at home following a long fight with cancer on June 29, 2007.
