= Regal Theater, Chicago =

Music venue in Chicago, Illinois, U.S. (1928–1968)

Coordinates: 41.8092°N 87.6158°W

Regal Theater
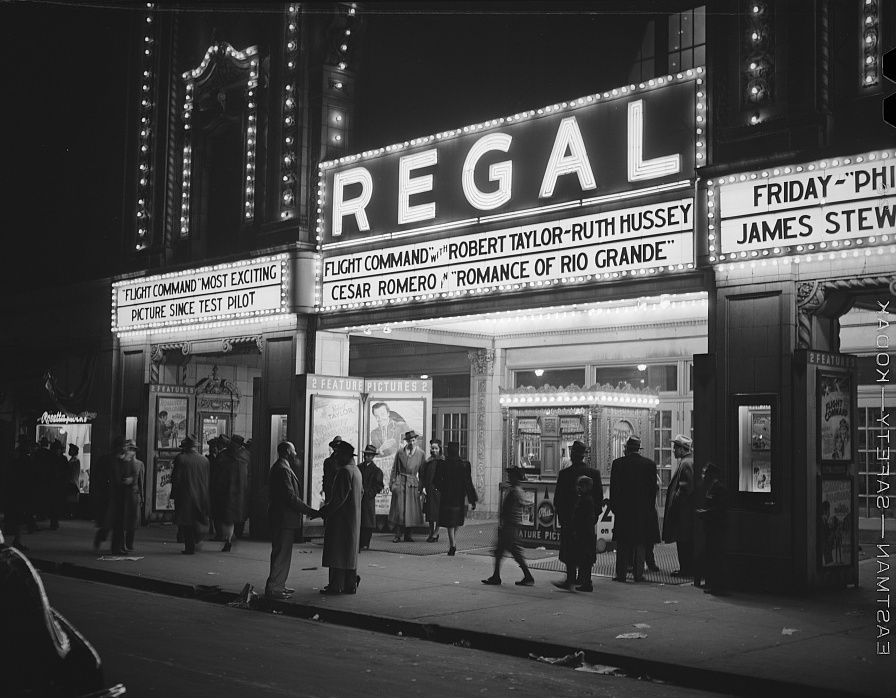
- Exterior in 1941
- Interactive map of Regal Theater
- Location: 4719 South Parkway (later Dr. Martin Luther King Jr. Drive); Bronzeville, Chicago, Illinois, United States
- Type: Nightclub; Music venue
- Events: Blues; Jazz; Bebop; R&B; Soul

Construction
- Opened: 1928; 98 years ago
- Closed: c. 1968

The Regal Theater was a night club, theater, and music venue, popular among African Americans, located in the Bronzeville neighborhood in Chicago, Illinois. The theater was designed by Edward Eichenbaum, and opened in February 1928. It closed in 1968 and was demolished in 1973.

Part of the Balaban and Katz chain, the venue featured some of the most celebrated African-American entertainers in America.

On what for a time was known as the Chitlin' Circuit, the Regal also featured motion pictures and live stage shows. Nat "King" Cole, Cab Calloway, Louis Armstrong, Ella Fitzgerald, Sarah Vaughan, Lena Horne, Dinah Washington, Ethel Waters, Miles Davis, Sammy Davis Jr., Bill Robinson, Moms Mabley, Lionel Hampton, Dizzy Gillespie, and Duke Ellington performed frequently at the theater from the 1920s through the 1940s.

Other acts to appear at the Regal over the years included such performers as The Supremes, Wayne Cochran, The Esquires, The Temptations, The Four Tops, B.B. King, Herbie Hancock, Della Reese, Stevie Wonder, Les Paul, Gladys Knight & the Pips, International Sweethearts of Rhythm, Dionne Warwick, James Brown & The Famous Flames, The Isley Brothers, John Coltrane, Etta James, Pearl Bailey, The Impressions, Dorothy Dandridge, Revella Hughes, Five Stairsteps, Peg Leg Bates, Dave Peyton, and Martha and the Vandellas.

== History ==
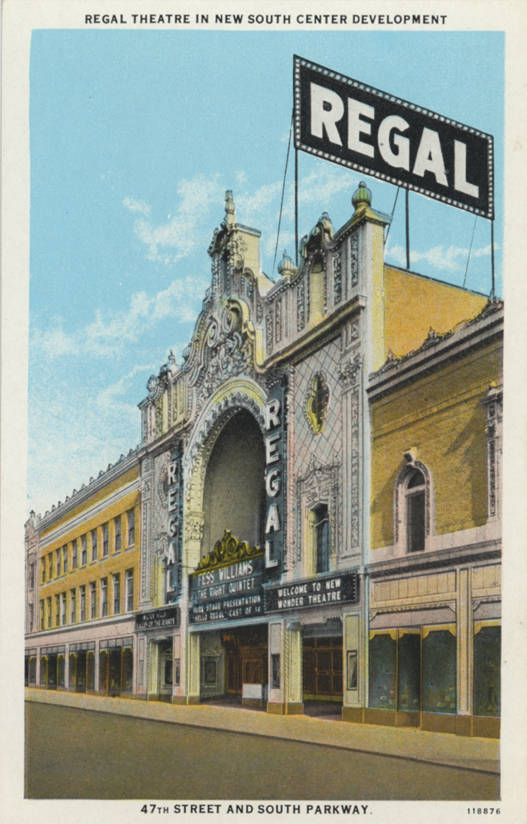
Postcard from 1928

The Regal was a major complex that featured films, dance, music, and comedy. The theater was a prominent entertainment venue for over four decades in Chicago, Illinois. This theater opened on February 4, 1928, located in "Bronzeville", at 4719 South Parkway (now King Drive). The theater was designed by Levy and Klein and was influenced by Harlem's Savoy Ballroom in New York City.

Owned by a white business association in Chicago, and seating about 3,000 people, the theater was one of the first entertainment complexes available for black audiences, employing black staff members (other than the musical acts).

In its early years, the Regal featured silent films, well-known black musicians of all genres, though mainly jazz and blues. Performers included Ray Charles, Sam Cooke, Stevie Wonder, Ella Fitzgerald, The Temptations, Miles Davis, Nat "King" Cole (from Chicago), Duke Ellington, Paul Robeson, Muddy Waters in 1956, the Jackson Five in 1968, and B.B. King. Typically shows consisted of an opening musical act followed by a film. The theater was situated near two popular black venues: both a nightclub (the Savoy Ballroom) and a major retailer (the South Center Department store).

The Regal was lavishly decorated, featuring velvet seating, large pillars, and grand spaces. Costing $1.5 million (in 1928 dollars) to construct, it was a venue that opened new doors for African Americans in the entertainment business.

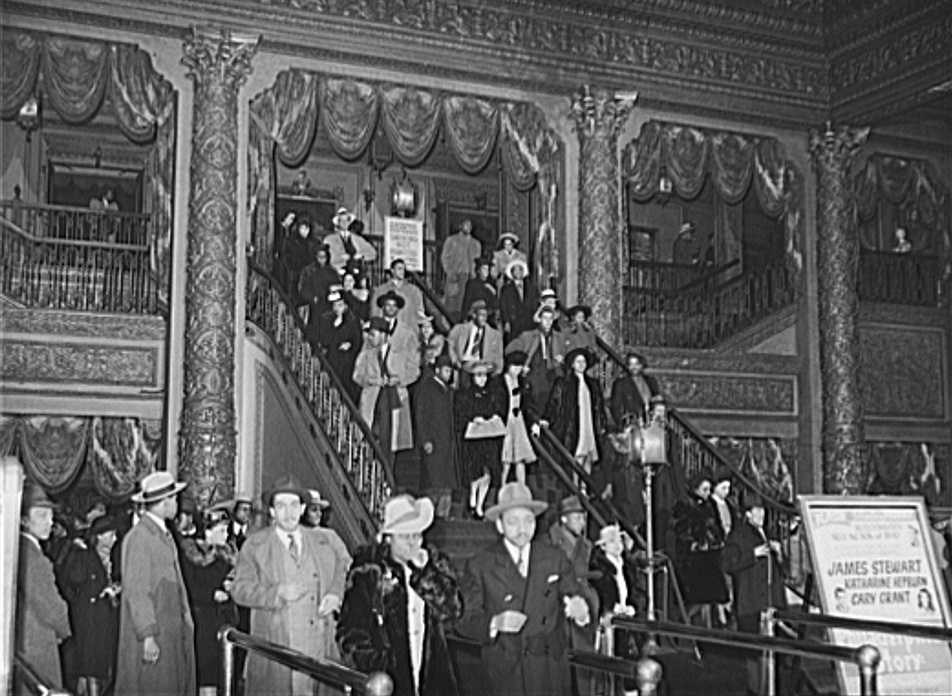
1941 photograph of a crowd exiting into the lobby

One of the house bands recruited for the Regal was Fess Williams and his Royal Flush Orchestra. They had been an opening act at the Savoy Ballroom and had begun to gain a following. Aware of their increased popularity, Balaban and Katz hired them as the Regal house band.

Often compared to the Apollo in Harlem, the Regal actually opened six years earlier, and had double the seating capacity. Both theaters were able to attract several big names but, due to its size and central location, the Regal was arguably able to book bigger acts.

Prior to the opening of the Regal, Chicago experienced the Great Migration, which brought a large number of blacks from the south into the city looking for a new life and work. After the signing of the Emancipation Proclamation in 1863, blacks began to slowly move from their southern homes. Once blacks had the ability to move away from their slave owners and find industrial jobs, the north was able to provide this "new life" for them. Over a 20- to 30-year period, waves of thousands of blacks left the south and entered major cities such as Chicago, New York City, Detroit, and elsewhere.

For most of its time, the Regal thrived with business by bringing in musical talents from across the country. People had some of the best times at the theater which helped spread the word about it and bring in more business. Eventually, with developments in technology like with the radio and TV, business began to decline. With the repercussions of all these factors, the Regal began losing more and more business which eventually led to the owner having to file bankruptcy and close down the theater in 1968. The building was later demolished in 1973. The site is now occupied by the Harold Washington Cultural Center.

== Notable events ==
In June 1962, "Little" Stevie Wonder recorded his famous live version of the number-one hit single "Fingertips" at a Motortown Revue there that included Marvin Gaye, Smokey Robinson & The Miracles, Mary Wells, and The Marvelettes. In May 1964, during a performance at the theater, Aretha Franklin was crowned, "the Queen of Soul" by music promoter Pervis Spann.

B.B. King recorded his famous live album Live at the Regal at the theater in November 1964. Gene Chandler appeared many times at the theater, and recorded a live album there in 1965 (variously titled Live at the Regal and Live On Stage In '65). From August 12–27, 1968, The Jackson 5 opened for Motown acts Gladys Knight & The Pips and Bobby Taylor & the Vancouvers.

== Bibliography ==
- Green, Adam (2007). Selling the Race: Culture, Community, and Black Chicago, 1940–1955. Chicago: University of Chicago Press. ISBN 0226306410
- Moore, D. "CineWiki - Regal Theater and African-American Exhibition in Chicago." CineWiki - Regal Theater and African-American Exhibition in Chicago, December 14, 2008. Web. April 23, 2013.
- "Once Majestic Regal Awaits Wrecker", Chicago Tribune, September 6, 1973.
- Ottley, Roy. "Regal Theater, Frayed but Imposing, Tailored for the Community", Chicago Tribune, February 27, 1955.
- Semmes, Clovis E. (2006). The Regal Theater and Black Culture. New York: Palgrave Macmillan. ISBN 978-1403971715
