= Armour Square, Chicago =

Community area in Chicago, Illinois

Armour Square
- Community area
- Community Area 34 - Armour Square
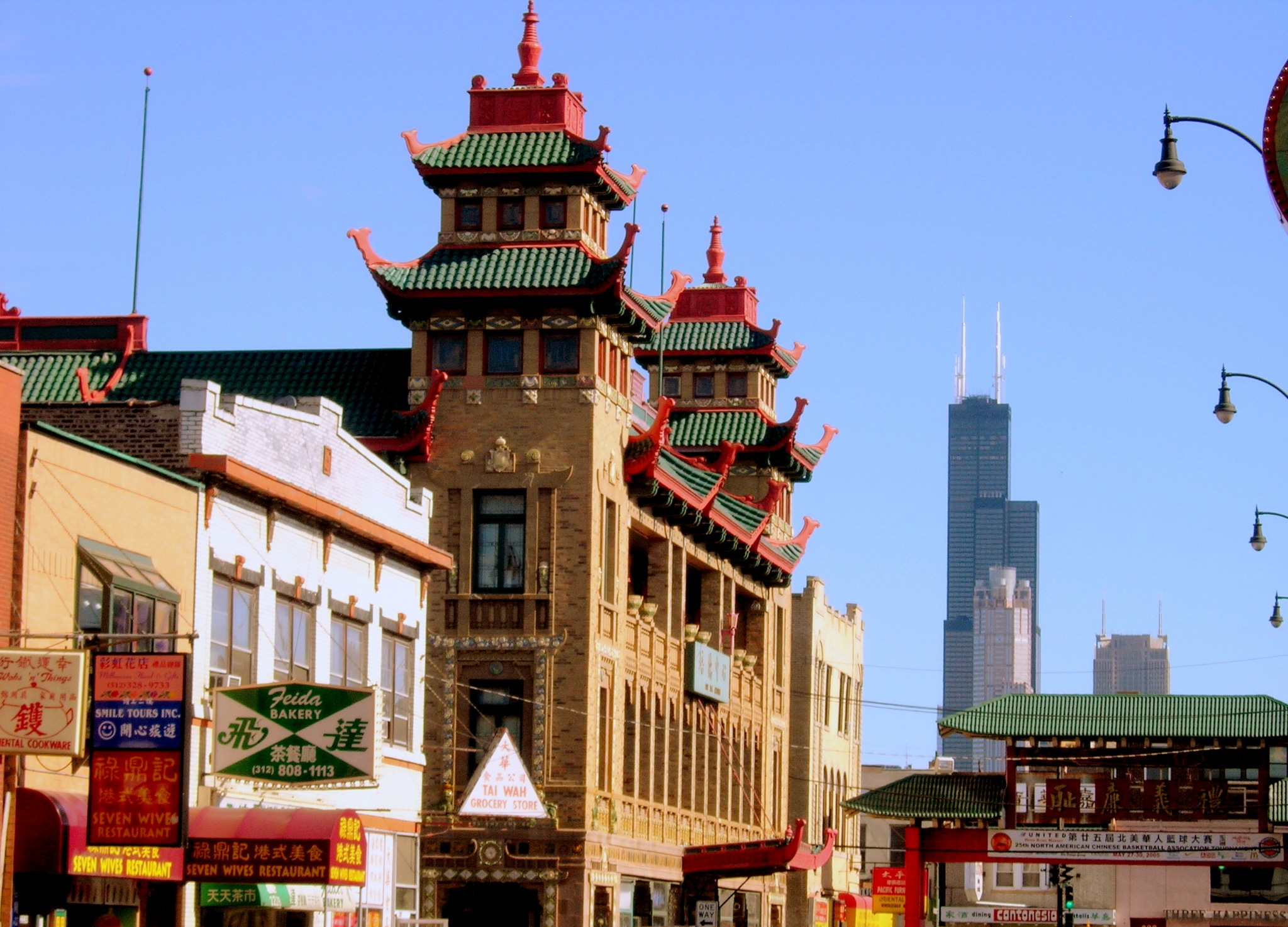
- Chinatown neighborhood within Armour Square.

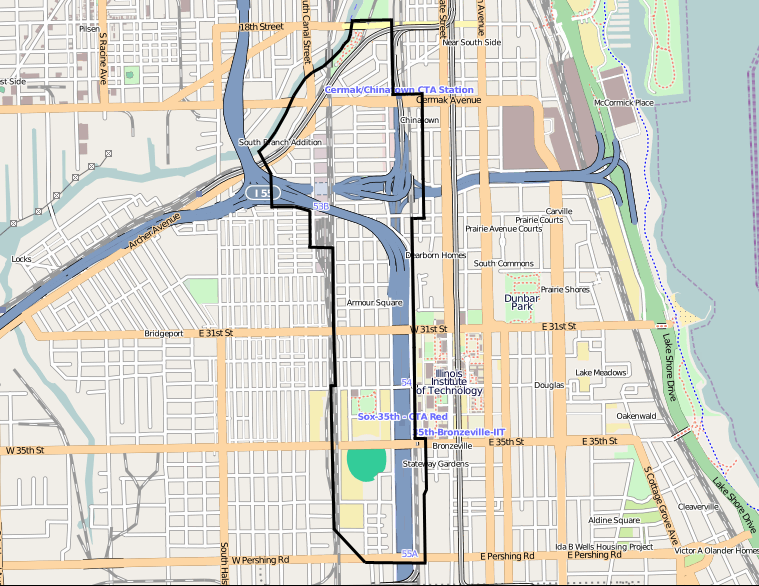
- Map of Armour Square

- Location within the city of Chicago
- Coordinates: 41°50′24″N 87°37′59″W
- Country: United States
- State: Illinois
- County: Cook
- City: Chicago
- Neighborhoods: List: Chinatown; Armour Square; Wentworth Gardens (CHA)

Area
  - Total: 0.99 sq mi (2.56 km^{2})
- Elevation: 587 ft (179 m)

Population (2024)
  - Total: 13,885
  - Density: 14,000/sq mi (5,420/km^{2})

Demographics 2024
  - White: 13.2%
  - Black: 11.7%
  - Hispanic: 4.7%
  - Asian: 66.4%
  - Other: 4.0%

Educational Attainment 2023
  - High School Diploma or Higher: 70.7%
  - Bachelor's Degree or Higher: 29.7%
- Time zone: UTC-6 (CST)
  - Summer (DST): UTC-5 (CDT)
- ZIP codes: parts of 60609 and 60616
- Median household income 2020: $37,123
- Source: U.S. Census, Record Information Services

Armour Square is one of the 77 community areas of Chicago in Illinois, United States, located on the city's South Side. It includes Chinatown and the CHA Wentworth Gardens housing project. Armour Square is bordered by Bridgeport to the west, Pilsen to the northwest, Douglas and Grand Boulevard to the east and southeast, and with the Near South Side bordering the area to the north, and Fuller Park bordering its southernmost boundary, along Pershing Road.

== Geography ==
Armour Square is bounded by 18th Street to the north, Pershing Road to the south, the Union Pacific railroad tracks on the west and the Dan Ryan Expressway to the east.

== Neighborhood demographics ==
Historical population
Census	Pop.	Note	%±
1930	21,450		—
1940	18,472		−13.9%
1950	23,294		26.1%
1960	15,783		−32.2%
1970	13,063		−17.2%
1980	12,475		−4.5%
1990	10,801		−13.4%
2000	12,032		11.4%
2010	13,391		11.3%
2020	13,890		3.7%

Armour Square has historically been a predominantly Southern European, working-class neighborhood with a particularly significant population of both Italian-Americans and Croatian-Americans. With its location being immediately south of Chinatown, today the neighborhood also has a large Asian population as well. A 2014 survey found that 46.6% of the neighborhood speaks Chinese at home. The 3406 census tract in the south of Armour Square is 99% black or African American.

== Buildings and structures ==
Armour Square's most recognizable landmarks are the historic Armour Square Park and nearby Rate Field, which sits at the southeast corner of W.35th and Shields Avenue, on the neighborhood's southernmost end. Guaranteed Rate is home to the Major League Baseball franchise, the Chicago White Sox. There are three Catholic parishes in Armour Square: Santa Lucia, St. Therese Catholic Community at 218 W. Alexander St., and St. Jerome Croatian Catholic Church.

Historical images of Armour Square can be found in Explore Chicago Collections, a digital repository made available by Chicago Collections archives, libraries and other cultural institutions in the city.

In September 2022, the Chicago Plan Commission approved a plan to renovate a vacant Armour Square warehouse building into 47 solar-powered apartments.

The Chicago Housing Authority operates a 392-unit residential building for seniors age 62 and up in Armour Square on Wentworth Avenue.

== Chicago White Sox ==
In 1900, Charles Comiskey moved his St. Paul Saints to Chicago, where they became the team now known as the Chicago White Sox. They began play at the South Side Park on 39th Street in Armour Square, and have remained in the neighborhood ever since. No other major professional sports franchise has played in the same neighborhood longer than the White Sox. In 1910, Comiskey Park opened just four blocks north of South Side Park on a site that was formerly a junkyard. The Park remained the home of the Sox until 1990, when it was the oldest park in Major League Baseball. The new Comiskey Park, currently known as Rate Field, opened in 1991 across 35th Street from the old ballpark. Comiskey Park was then demolished in 1991 and converted into a parking lot. A plaque embedded in the asphalt marks the spot where home plate was on the original field.

== Chinatown ==
Chicago's Chinatown is located in the Armour Square community area centered on and around Cermak and Wentworth Avenues, and is an example of an American Chinatown, or ethnic-Chinese neighborhood.

The Chinatown in the Armour Square community area is not to be confused with the Argyle Street, sometimes called "New Chinatown", which is on the North Side of Chicago and hosts Chinese, Vietnamese, Filipino, Thai and other Southeast Asian homes and businesses.

== Politics ==
The Armour Square community area has supported the Democratic Party in the past two presidential elections. In the 2016 presidential election, Armour Square cast 2,892 votes for Hillary Clinton and cast 761 votes for Donald Trump (76.67% to 20.17%). In the 2012 presidential election, Armour Square cast 2,581 votes for Barack Obama and cast 575 votes for Mitt Romney (81.01% to 18.05%).

== Mass transit stations ==
Armour Square is served by the Dan Ryan branch of the Chicago Transit Authority's Red Line, with stops at Cermak-Chinatown and Sox-35th. It is also served by Metra on the Rock Island Line via the 35th Street station.

== Education ==
Chicago Public Schools serves residents of the community area; K-8 schools serving Armour Square include Haines and James Ward. Ward Elementary opened as Garibaldi Street Primary School in 1874, and became the Ward School in 1875, before receiving its current name in 1908. Residents are zoned to Phillips Academy High School.
