= Prairie Avenue Courts =

Public housing complex in Chicago, Illinois, United States

Coordinates: 41°50′39″N 87°37′8″W

- Interactive map of Prairie Avenue Courts

General information
- Location: Bordered by 26th and 29th Streets and M. L. King Jr. Drive and Prairie Avenue; Chicago, Illinois; United States
- Status: Demolished

Construction
- Constructed: 1950–1952; 1956–1958 (high-rise)

Listing
- Demolished: 2002–2003

Other information
- Governing body: Chicago Housing Authority (CHA)

Prairie Avenue Courts was a Chicago Housing Authority (CHA) public housing project in the South Commons neighborhood located on the south side of Chicago, Illinois, United States. First buildings completed in 1952, Prairie Avenue Courts consisted of two-story row-houses, seven and fourteen-story buildings. Prairie Avenue Courts were located to the south of McCormick Place and adjacent to Dunbar Park and Dunbar Vocational High School.

== History ==
In January 1955, The Chicago Housing Authority approved construction on 6,000 public housing units; which included 200 units at Prairie Avenue Courts. In 1956, extension of the original buildings were constructed; completed in 1958. The 13–story building located at 2822 S. Prairie Avenue welcomed its first tenants, The Gleghorns, on August 31, 1958. Then–mayor Richard J. Daley presented the family with their key.
