= South Deering, Chicago =

Community area in Chicago, Illinois

South Deering
- Community area
- Community Area 51 - South Deering
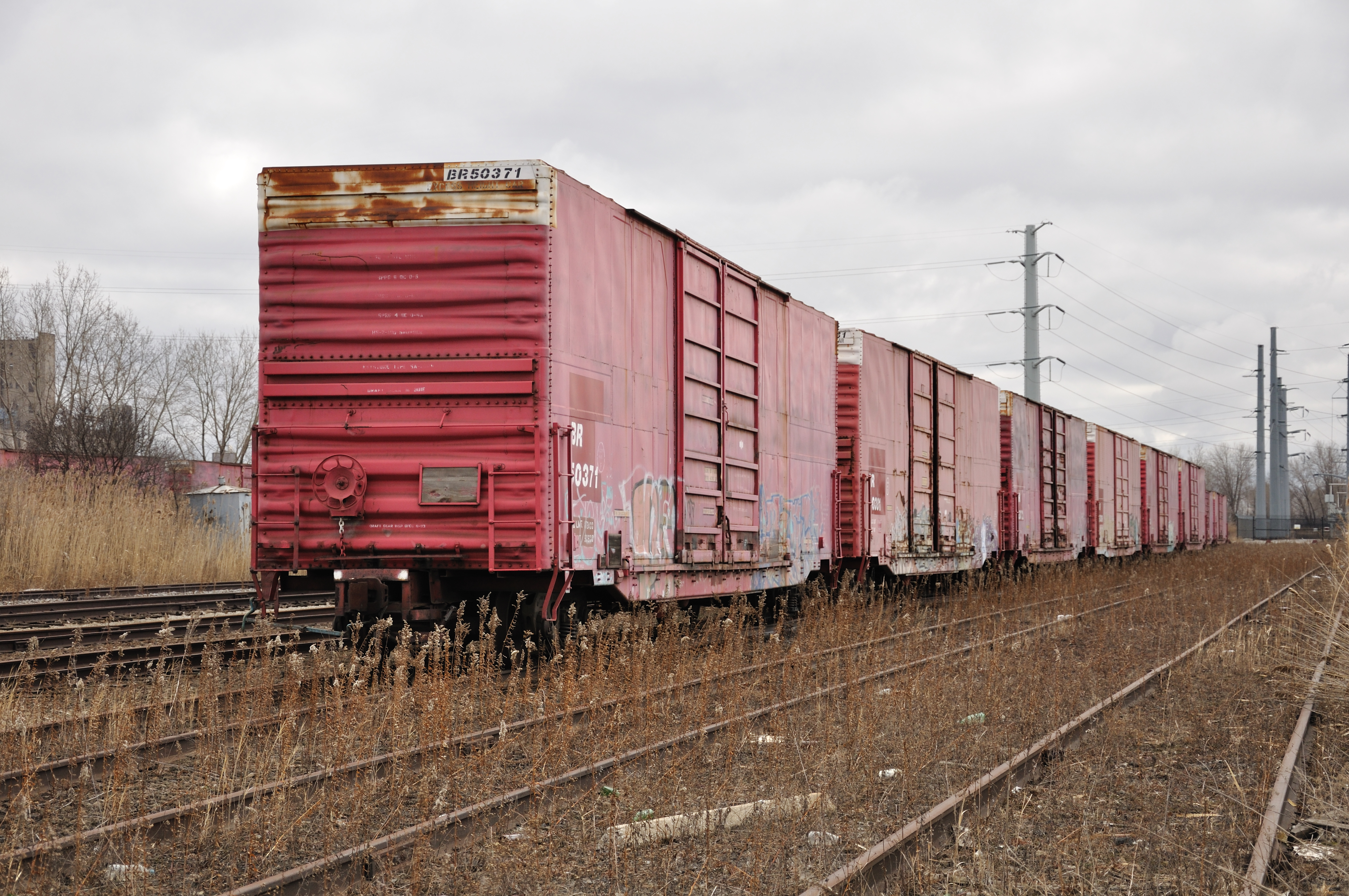
- Boxcars in the area

- Location within the city of Chicago
- Coordinates: 41°42.6′N 87°33.6′W
- Country: United States
- State: Illinois
- County: Cook
- City: Chicago
- Neighborhoods: list: Jeffery Manor; Slag Valley; Irondale; Vet's Park

Area
  - Total: 10.70 sq mi (27.71 km^{2})

Population (2024)
  - Total: 12,854
  - Density: 1,201/sq mi (463.9/km^{2})

Demographics 2024
  - White: 5.9%
  - Black: 62.2%
  - Hispanic: 30.8%
  - Asian: 0.1%
  - Other: 1.0%

Educational Attainment 2024
  - High School Diploma or Higher: 84.1%
  - Bachelor's Degree or Higher: 16.0%
- Time zone: UTC-6 (CST)
  - Summer (DST): UTC-5 (CDT)
- ZIP Codes: parts of 60617 and 60633
- Median household income (2023): $37,095
- Source: U.S. Census, Record Information Services

South Deering, located on Chicago's far South Side, is the largest of the 77 official community areas of that city. Primarily an industrial area, a small residential neighborhood exists in the northeast corner and Lake Calumet takes up a large portion of the area. 80% of the community area is zoned as industrial, natural wetlands, or parks. The remaining 20% is zoned for residential and small-scale commercial uses; these are only a north-center strip and a part of Avalon Trails extending from nearby Hegewisch. It is part of the 10th Ward, once under the control of former Richard J. Daley ally Alderman Edward Vrdolyak.

The neighborhood is named for Charles Deering, an executive in the Deering Harvester Company that would later form a major part of International Harvester. International Harvester owned Wisconsin Steel, which was originally established in 1875 and was located along Torrence Avenue south of 106th Street to 109th Street.

It is the location of Calumet Fisheries, a historic seafood restaurant that opened in 1928 and has been featured on Anthony Bourdain: No Reservations. The original Calumet Bakery store, a South Side favorite since 1935, is located at 2510 E 106th St, Chicago, IL 60617. It was also the location of the Wisconsin Steel Works, originally the Joseph H. Brown Iron and Steel Company, which opened in 1875 and closed in 1980. Since the closing of the steel mill, the neighborhood has remained economically depressed.

Louis Rosen documented the racial transition of this and nearby communities in his 1998 book The South Side: The Racial Transformation of an American Neighborhood.

== Neighborhoods ==
=== Irondale ===
The original settlement of South Deering was named "Irondale" before 1903, founded when the Joseph H. Brown Iron & Steel Company (later Wisconsin Steel) was established in 1875. Irondale was concentrated along and west of Torrence Avenue from 103rd Street to 109th. Large numbers of taverns were located along Torrence Avenue south of 106th Street to serve factory workers at the end of their shifts.

Aerial photographs from the 1930s show that the areas that would become Jeffrey Manor and Vet's Park were platted in the 1920s during the Chicago real estate boom, but it would not be until the 1950s that these plots would have homes constructed upon them due to the effects of the Great Depression.

The Trumbull Park Homes were built in 1937–38 immediately west of the original settlement, and were the site of major racial violence in July 1953 when the Chicago Housing Authority (CHA) accidentally gave permission to a black family to move into the segregated housing project (the applicant, Betty Howard, was an exceptionally light-skinned black woman). A police presence was maintained for nearly a year after, and in October 1953 the CHA gave further permission for 10 more black families to move into the project. Racial tensions continued, and black residents feared using the nearby park without police protection through 1963.

=== Jeffery Manor ===
Jeffery Manor is located between 95th Street on the north, Torrence Avenue on the east, 103rd Street on the south, and Norfolk Southern Railway railroad yard on the west (just west of South Van Vlissingen Road). Construction began in 1947. When the steel mills operated, this area was predominantly Jewish, populated by World War II veterans purchasing their first house. The homes in this area are primarily duplexes, with bungalows and stand-alone two-storey homes around the edges.

The neighborhood of Jeffery Manor also includes another, smaller neighborhood, called Merrionette Manor. This sub-neighborhood is a unique break from the Chicago grid system, as the streets curve and form loops, giving a suburban feel in the heart of an otherwise urban, industrial neighborhood.

=== Vet's Park ===
Vet's Park is an area encompassed by 95th Street on the north, Torrence Avenue on the west, 103rd Street on the south, and the Norfolk Southern railroad tracks (east of Commercial Avenue) on the east. Many of the houses in Vet's Park were built immediately after World War Two to house returning soldiers who wanted to work in the local industries.

=== Slag Valley ===
The area along S. Commercial Avenue between 104th and 100th Streets has been nicknamed "Slag Valley" by the locals for nearly 100 years, since large mounds of slag, petroleum coke, salt and other substances are left out in the open near homes and businesses.

In 2013, community activists have fought to have the mounds removed, since the dust can damage the health of residents, and succeeded in having a city ordinance passed banning open-air storage of petcoke in 2015. The piles were removed in June 2016, but in 2017, the Environmental Protection Agency (EPA) warned residents of high levels of airborne manganese blowing over from the same areas that stored petcoke. Manganese can lead to a permanent neurological disorder known as manganism, the symptoms of which include tremors, difficulty walking, facial muscle spasms and mood changes. In children, manganese can affect brain development, including changes in behavior and decreases in learning and memory capacities. As of December 2017, the EPA and city of Chicago are still investigating.

== History ==
=== Early history ===
South Deering was originally settled in the 1870s by workers from England, Wales, and Ireland who were attracted by the industrial jobs in nearby factories. As more industries were set up along the Calumet River, immigrants from eastern and southern Europe arrived, in addition to a small Mexican community which formed by the 1910s.

Major employers included Wisconsin Steel, Illinois Slag and Ballast Company, and the Federal Furnace Company, as well as U.S. Steel Southworks in nearby South Chicago and the Ford Assembly Plant in Hegewisch. Additionally, a large railroad marshalling yard has been present in the northwest part of the neighborhood since the 1870s.

=== 20th century ===
The area prospered through World War One and the 1920s, but like other neighborhoods reliant on heavy industry, South Deering was devastated during the Great Depression. The decline in production led to mass unemployment, and by October 1933 some 20% of households were receiving relief from the city, state, or federal government.

South Deering's fortunes improved with the onset of World War II, as the mills and other factories operated around-the-clock, even on holidays, to produce the steel, food products, and armored vehicles necessary to win the war. The segregated Trumbull Park Homes, a public housing project, and the Jeffery Manor subdivision were constructed beginning in 1938 and 1947, respectively, and the population increased from 7,900 in 1930 to 18,900 by 1960. Starting in 1953, racial tensions worsened as the existing white residents violently opposed a handful of black residents who were seeking suburban-style homes close to the factories. White flight occurred in South Deering in the 1960s and 1970s, as white families began to move to suburbs such as Dolton, Riverdale, Burnham, Calumet City, South Holland, and Lansing, but it never reached the levels of other neighborhoods such as Roseland, South Chicago, and South Shore.

While the Calumet River was industrialized by the Great Depression, Lake Calumet itself was left mostly untouched until the 1950s, when the city of Chicago and state of Illinois began to infill parts of the lake to construct the International Port of Illinois (1959) and large slips for more steel mills, chemical plants, and oil refineries.

However, the decline of heavy industry slammed South Deering in the 1970s and 1980s. International Harvester sold Wisconsin Steel in 1977, and the new owners closed the plant without warning in 1980. Approximately 3,000 workers lost their jobs and much of their pension benefits in the shutdown. Workers organized the Wisconsin Steel Save Our Jobs Committee and brought suit against International Harvester and its bank, ultimately recovering some of the lost pension benefits. In 1992, the nearby U.S. Steel Southworks closed for good following years of layoffs. The neighborhood's population declined by nearly 10% between 1960 and 2000.

=== Modern day ===
Today, South Deering is a primarily black and Latino neighborhood, with some elderly white ethnic residents remaining. The average household income is 43% below the average for the city of Chicago as a whole, and about 25% of the population lives in poverty. Crime is somewhat higher than average, but South Deering has been spared the worst violence that has plagued nearby neighborhoods such as Pullman and South Chicago. The Insane King Cobras and Spanish Vice Lords were founded in this neighborhood in 1979 and 1980, respectively, though violent crime has significantly died down since the early 1990s. Petty crime does remain a problem, however.

In recent years, many abandoned factories were demolished, leaving large tracts of polluted land behind. Community activists have fought to establish more natural parkland in the area, and have some former industrial sites designated as Superfund sites, citing the health hazards to residents, with varying degrees of success.

== Demographics ==
According to a June 2017 analysis by the Chicago Metropolitan Agency for Planning, there were 15,305 people and 5,068 households in South Deering. The racial makeup of the area was 3.9% White, 65.1% African American, 0.1% Asian, 1.0% from other races. Hispanic or Latino of any race were 29.9% of the population. In the area, the population was spread out, with 28.8% under the age of 19, 19.1% from 20 to 34, 16.4% from 35 to 49, 19.6% from 50 to 64, and 15% who were 65 years of age or older. The median age was 37 years.

Historical population
Census	Pop.	Note	%±
1930	7,898		—
1940	9,662		22.3%
1950	17,476		80.9%
1960	18,794		7.5%
1970	19,271		2.5%
1980	19,400		0.7%
1990	17,755		−8.5%
2000	16,955		−4.5%
2010	17,725		4.5%
2020	14,105		−20.4%

== Politics ==
South Deering overwhelmingly voted for the Democratic Party in the past two presidential elections. In the 2016 presidential election, South Deering cast 5,980 votes for Hillary Clinton and cast 486 votes for Donald Trump. In the 2012 presidential election, South Deering cast 6,772 votes for Barack Obama and cast 462 votes for Mitt Romney.

== Transportation ==
South Deering is served by a number of CTA bus routes:

- N5 South Shore Night Bus
- J14 Jeffery Jump
- 15 Jeffery Local
- 28 Stony Island
- 71 71st/South Shore
- 95 95th
- 100 Jeffery Manor Express (weekday rush hours only)
- 106 East 103rd

The CTA Red Line will be extended to 130th Street in the Vicinity of Riverdale and South Deering.

== Religion ==
The Roman Catholic Archdiocese of Chicago operates Catholic churches. On July 1, 2020, Our Lady Gate of Heaven Church in Jeffery Manor, along with Our Lady of Peace, St. Bride, and St. Philip Neri in South Shore, will merge.

== Notable residents ==
- Jon Burge (1947–2018), detective in the Chicago Police Department who was convicted of crimes related to torturing more than 200 criminal suspects between 1972 and 1991 in order to force confessions. He was a childhood resident of 9612 South Luella Avenue.
- Gregory Mitchell (b. 1969), member of the Chicago City Council since 2015. He is a resident of Jeffery Manor.
- Sherman Skolnick (1930–2006), conspiracy theorist and activist. He resided at 9800 South Oglesby Avenue from 1950 until his death.
