= Marshall Field Garden Apartments =

Apartment building in Chicago, Illinois

- U.S. National Register of Historic Places
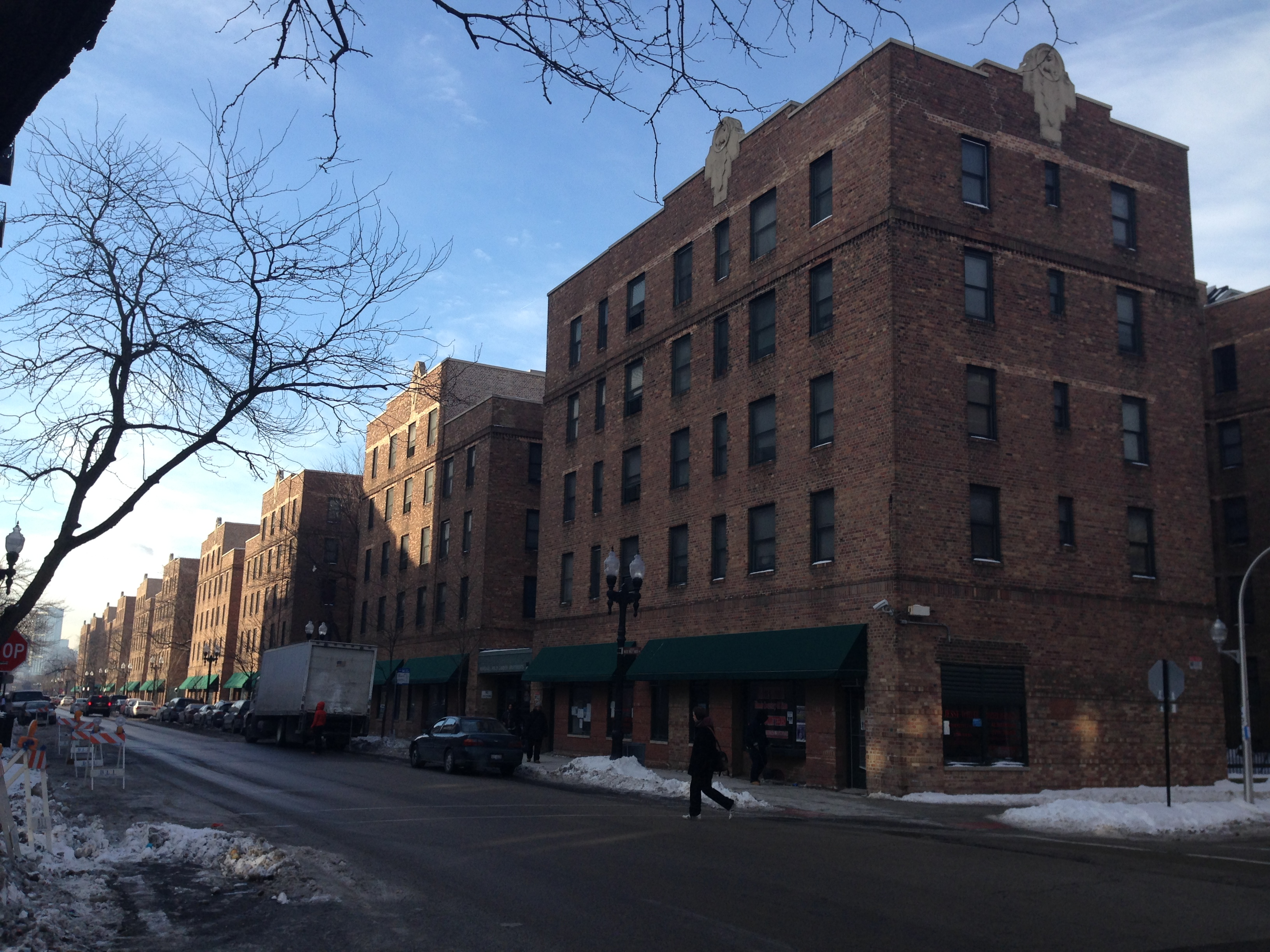
- Looking south on Sedgwick Street at Blackhawk Street

- Location within Chicago metropolitan area
- Location: 1336--1452 N. Sedgwick St., 1337--1453 N. Hudson Ave., 400--424 W. Evergreen Ave. and 401--425 W. Blackhawk St., Chicago, Illinois
- Coordinates: 41.9080°N 87.6388°W
- Area: 5 acres (2.0 ha)
- Architect: Andrew J. Thomas
- Architectural style: Late 19th And Early 20th Century American Movements
- NRHP reference No.: 91001691
- Added to NRHP: December 17, 1991

The Marshall Field Garden Apartments is a large non-governmental subsidized housing project in the Near North Side neighborhood of Chicago, Illinois. The project occupies two square city blocks and was the largest moderate-income housing development in the U.S. at the time of construction in 1929. Marshall Field Garden Apartments has 628 units within 10 buildings.

== History ==
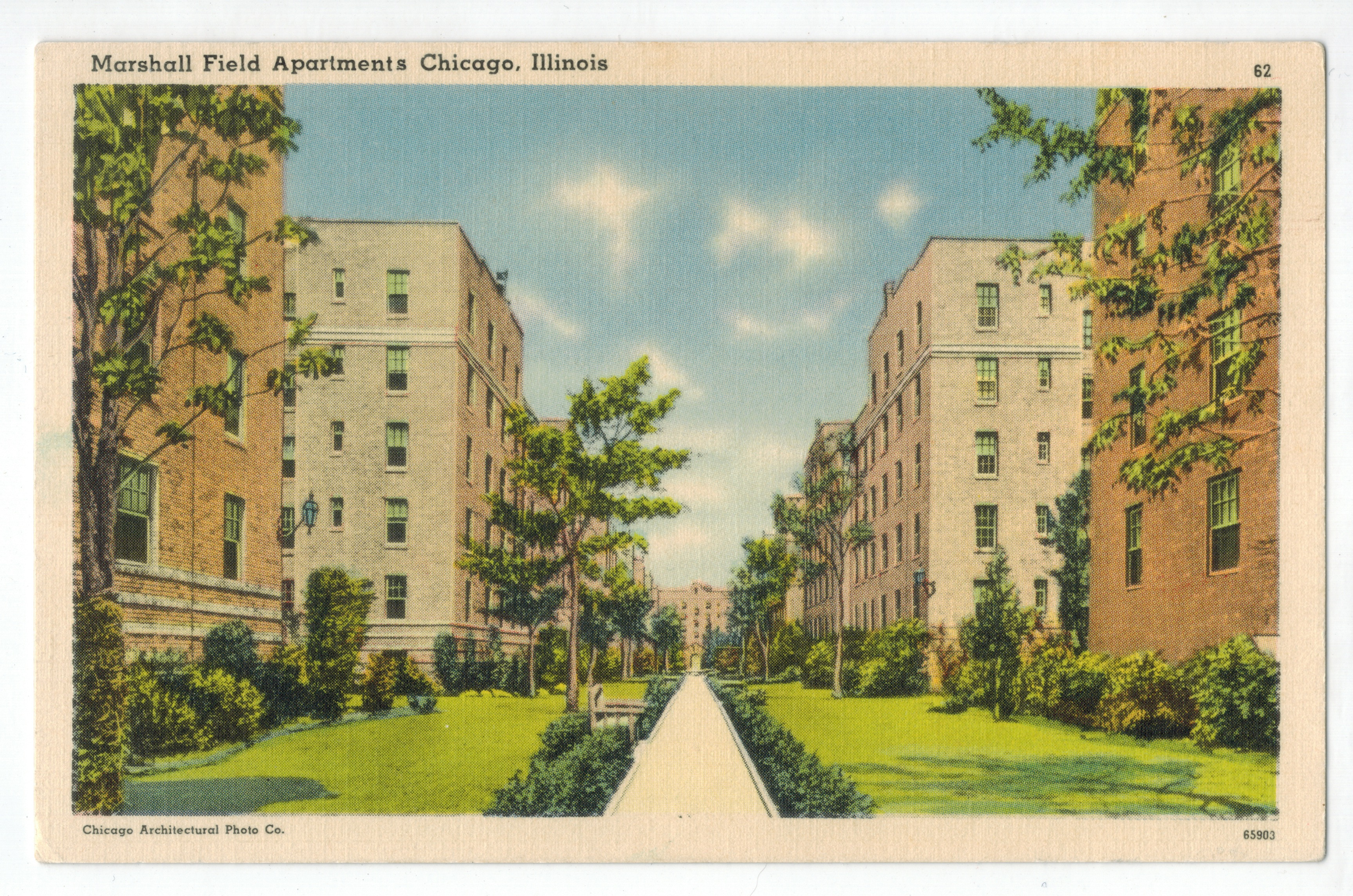
Postcard of the apartments

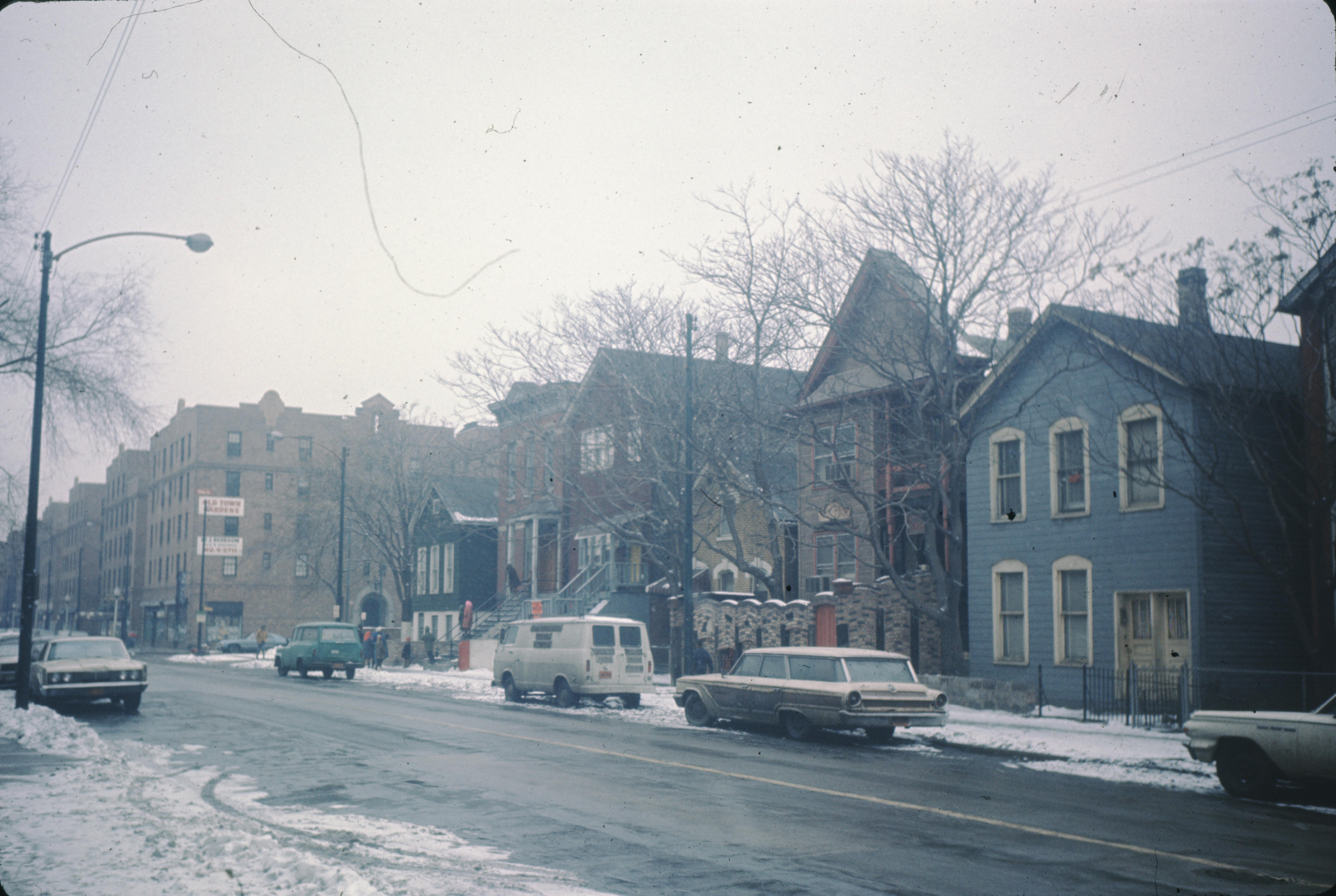
the 1500 block of north Sedgwick street circa 1966. The apartments can be seen in the left of the image, and have been renamed to 'Old Town Gardens'

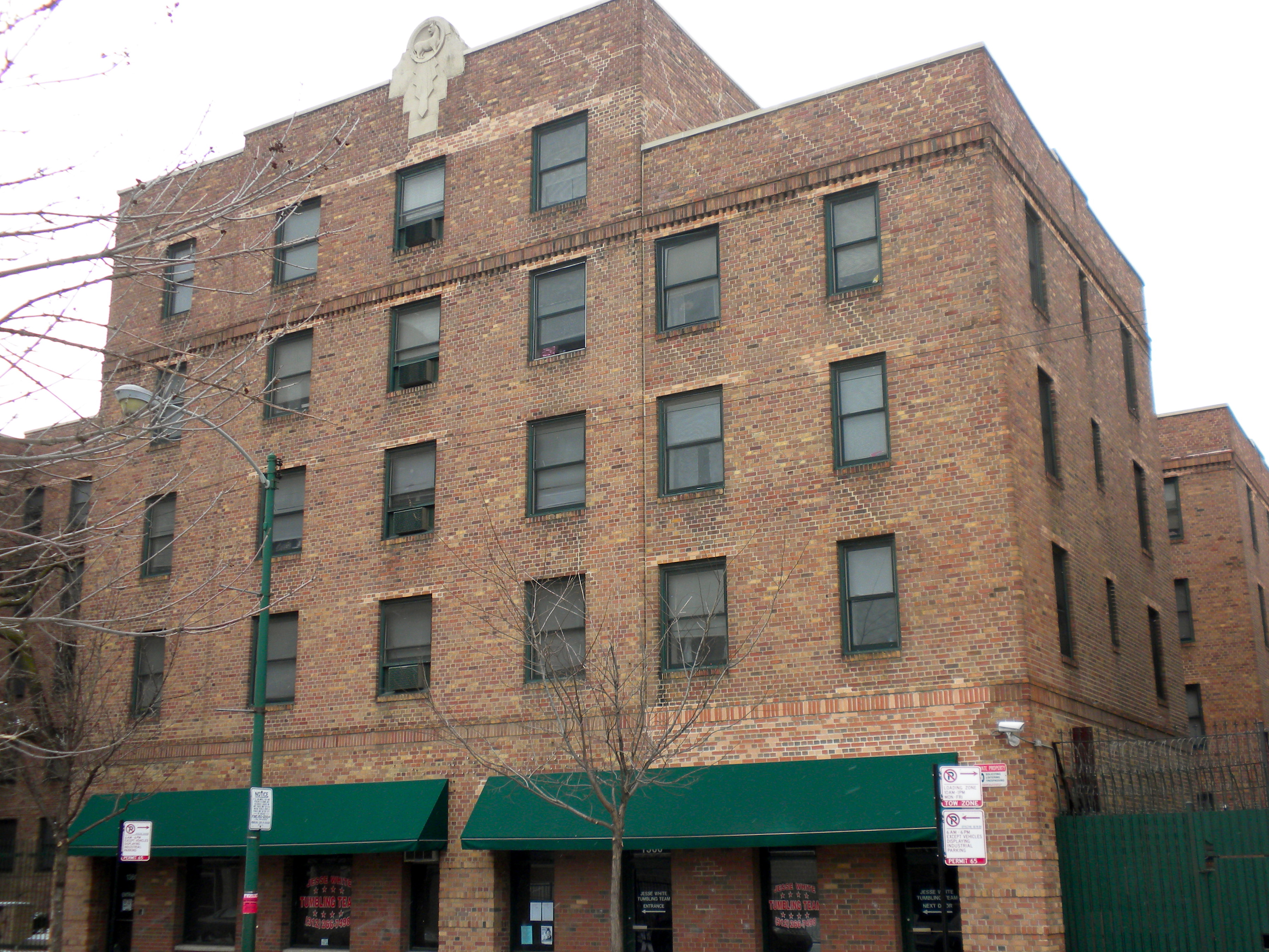
The apartments

The project was developed by the estate of Marshall Field, entrepreneur and founder of the Chicago Marshall Field's department store chain. The project was directed by Marshall Field III. Its aim was not only to provide housing at a reasonable cost but also to provide a catalyst for renewal of the surrounding area. Marshall Field Garden Apartments was at the time of construction one of two large philanthropic housing developments in Chicago. The other was Michigan Boulevard Garden Apartments, at 47th and Michigan. Both were built in 1929 and both were modeled after the Dunbar Apartments built by John D. Rockefeller Jr., in 1926 in Harlem, New York City.

Marshall Field Garden Apartments was meant to be the first of three or four similar projects, but the Great Depression kept those plans from coming to fruition. Marshall had hoped to provide low cost housing but land acquisition and construction cost overruns pushed the rent into the moderate range.

By 1991, the apartments had deteriorated, and were sold to private investors in 1992 with a clause that specified that they would remain available only to low income tenants for 25 years.

In 2016, the apartments were sold to Related Midwest, and in a public-private partnership agreement plan to keep the units affordable until 2045. Shortly after purchasing the apartments, Related Midwest hired local architecture firm Nia Architects to renovate and update the historic buildings.

== Location ==
Marshall Field Garden Apartments is located on 1450 North Sedgwick in Chicago, Illinois 60610. Marshall Field Gardens Apartments is a populated place located in Cook County at a latitude of 41.908 and longitude -87.639. The elevation is 594 feet. Marshall Field Garden Apartments appears on the Chicago Loop U.S. Geological Survey Map. Cook County is the Central Time Zone (UTC -6 hours) which Marshall Fields Gardens Apartments have.

== Security and Maintenance ==
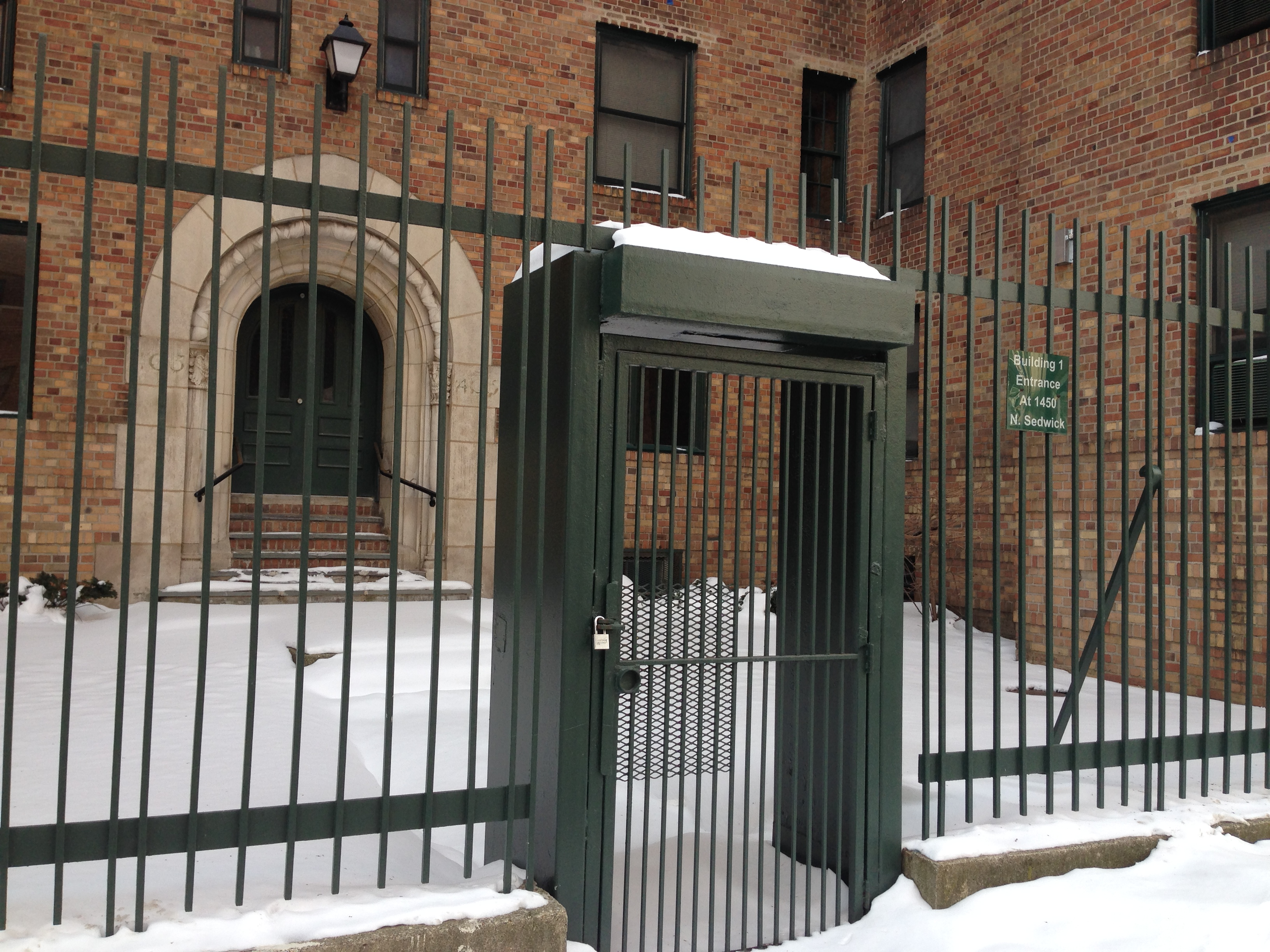
A former entrance to the apartments that has been fenced off

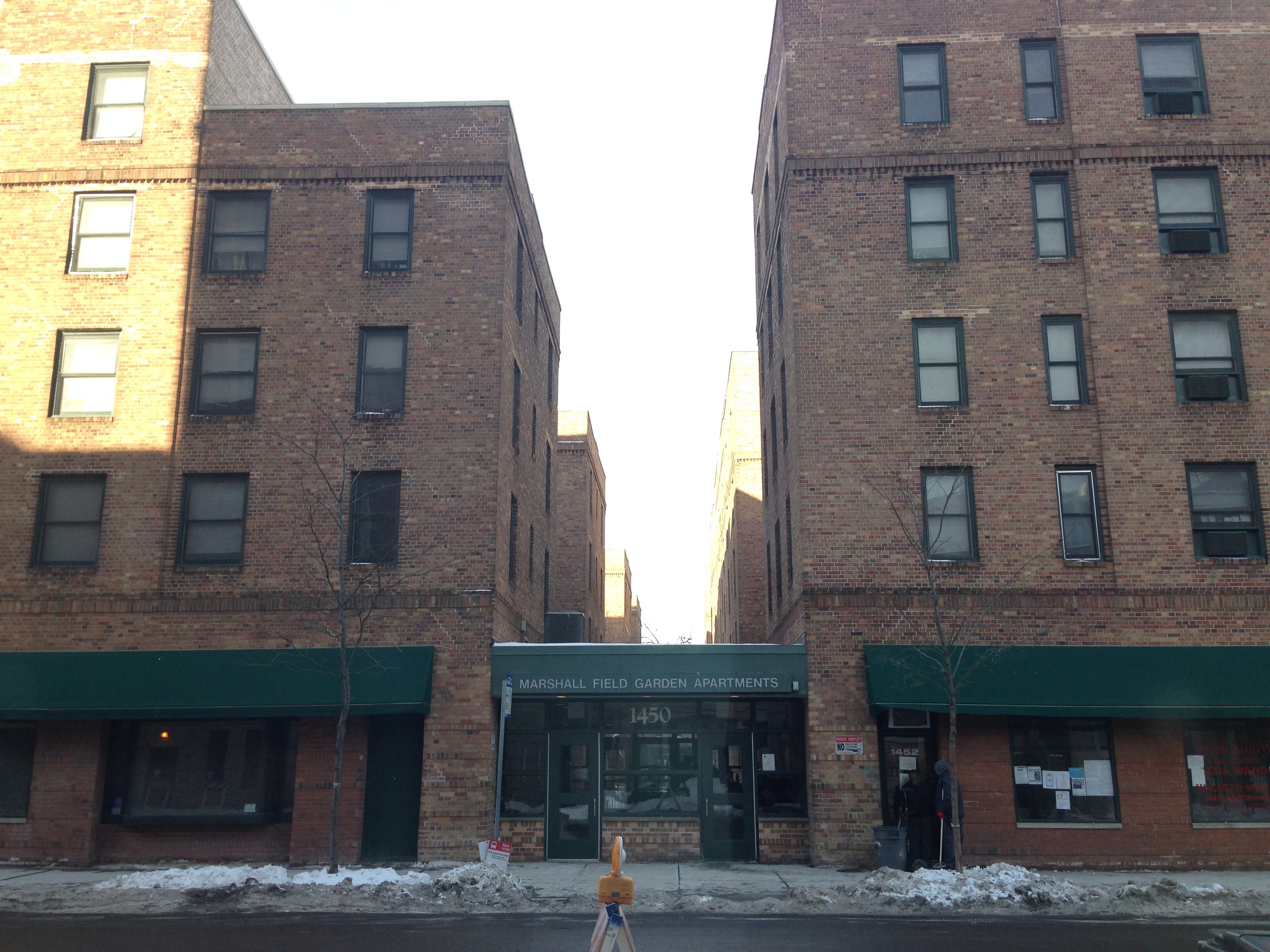
current entrance to Marshall Field Garden Apartments

A controversial security system was installed in 1999 to control access and provide valuable investigative information, using biometric devices. The apartments are the scene of frequent shootings.

In 2016, a dog was electrocuted and killed by a copper rod attached to the building. The dog's owner survived but suffered voltage burns on his legs.

== See also ==
- Polo G lived in the project in his youth.
- Chicago Housing Authority
- United States Department of Housing and Urban Development
