= Trumbull Park Homes =

Public housing development in Chicago, Illinois, United States

- Interactive map of Trumbull Park Homes

General information
- Location: Bounded by 105th and 109th Streets and by Bensley and Oglesby Avenues. (South Deering); Chicago, Illinois; United States
- Status: Renovated

Construction
- Constructed: 1938

Other information
- Governing body: Chicago Housing Authority

Trumbull Park Homes is a Chicago Housing Authority (CHA) public housing project located in the South Deering neighborhood on the Far-South Side of Chicago, Illinois, United States. Built in 1938, it consists of 55 buildings and 434 apartments. Its chief architect was John A. Holabird.

== Race riots ==
On July 30, 1953, the CHA moved Betty Howard, a light-skinned black woman, and her family into the project. Starting on August 5 and lasting for weeks, white residents of the projects attacked the Howard home with rocks, fireworks, with police doing little to stop them. In October 1953, the CHA decided to move 10 more black families in, sparking a new wave of violence. It was not until 1963 that blacks could go to the neighborhood park without police protection.
