= Wentworth Gardens =

Housing project in Chicago, Illinois

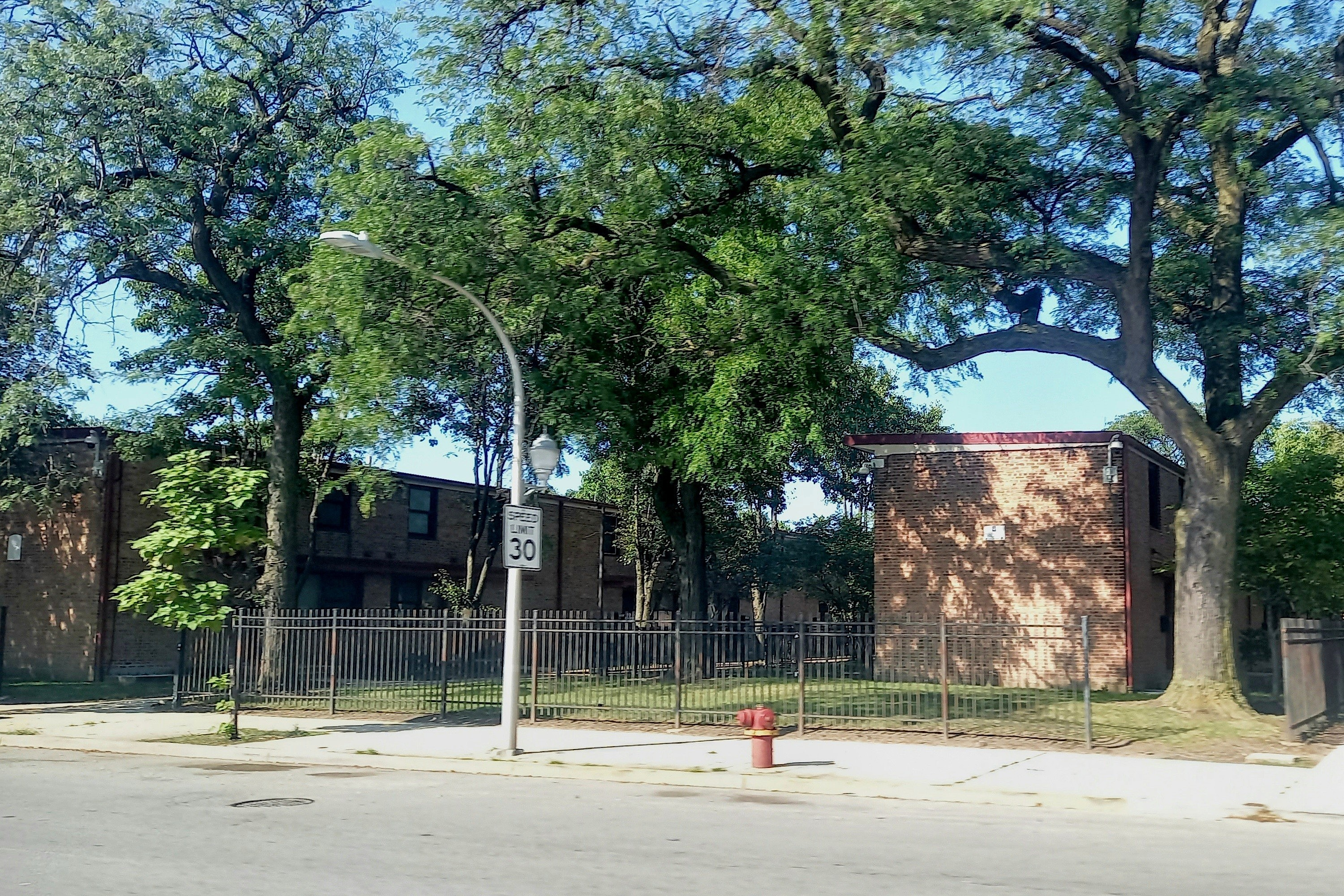
- Wentworth Gardens housing project, September 2025
- Interactive map of Wentworth Gardens

General information
- Location: Bounded by 37th Street on the north, Pershing Road on the south, Wentworth Avenue on the east, Princeton Street on the west. Chicago, Illinois; United States
- Coordinates: 41°49′38″N 87°37′40″W
- Status: 344 units, Renovated

Construction
- Constructed: 1944–45

Other information
- Governing body: Chicago Housing Authority
- Famous residents: Quincy Jones

Wentworth Gardens is a 344-unit housing project operated by the Chicago Housing Authority (CHA). It lies just south of Rate Field in Bronzeville on Chicago's south side.

== History ==
The site had originally been home to South Side Park, a baseball stadium for the Chicago White Sox (1900–1910) and then the Chicago American Giants of the Negro Baseball League (1910–1940). In 1944, the CHA purchased the site to build a 422-unit apartment complex of low-rise buildings and row houses. Wentworth Gardens opened in 1947 for returning World War II veterans and later thousands of low-income African American families in a tight-knit community. During the 1950s it was once labeled as "the best housing community in the city", until street gangs took over the buildings. By the 1970s, the project had become more unsettling and less tended to by CHA, resulting in the project declining overtime. Like all the other housing projects, Wentworth experienced a sharp increase in crime, mainly due to drugs and violent street gangs. The Gangster Disciples dominated all of the buildings in Wentworth in the early 1990s. The project was one of many CHA developments that was regularly swept by Chicago Housing Authority Police Department, as it was a part of "Operation Clean Sweep". In October 1996, police arrested 13 drug dealers in a drug sweep. Wentworth was nicknamed "Murdertown", due to high number of homicides that frequently occurred in the project. Residents blamed CHA for displacing families from the High-rises to Wentworth. The homicides was the end results of displacing some said.

== Renovation ==
In 1999, HUD implemented HOPE VI hoping to ease the housing crisis. Originally, the program was aimed to rehabilitate public housing, but in practice it demolished and significantly reduced public housing units. By 2000, Chicago mayor Richard M. Daley launched his Plan for Transformation for Public Housing, in which all high-rise developments were to be demolished and replaced with smaller-scale, mixed-income developments. In 2004, thanks to Wentworth activists, the development avoided demolition and the units were slated for a complete renovation. Yet in order for the renovation to occur, 90 percent of the units had to be vacated, leading to a significant number of displaced families. The renovation was completed in 2007 and reduced the number of units from 422 to 344. The renovated buildings came equipped with new rehabilitated units and walkways but lacked a security system which was installed into other active CHA developments.
