= Lowden Homes =

Public housing development in Chicago, Illinois, United States

Coordinates: 41°43′33.8″N 87°37′52.0″W

- Interactive map of Lowden Homes

General information
- Location: Bordered by 91st Street (North), 95th Street (South), Wentworth Ave. (East), Eggleston Ave. (West); Chicago, Illinois; United States
- Status: Renovated

Construction
- Constructed: 1952-54

Other information
- Governing body: Chicago Housing Authority

Lowden Homes is a Chicago Housing Authority (CHA) public housing project located in the Princeton Park neighborhood on the far South Side of Chicago, Illinois, United States. It is bordered by 91st and 95th Streets, Wentworth, and Eggleston Avenues.

== History ==
Named for Illinois governor Frank Lowden, the housing project has 127 units made up of two-story rowhouses. It opened in 1954.
