= St. Jerome Croatian Catholic Church =

Historic church in Chicago

St. Jerome Croatian Catholic Church is a historic church that belongs to the Roman Catholic Archdiocese of Chicago. It is located in the Armour Square neighborhood on the city's South Side. The church performs services in both Croatian and English.

== History ==
St. Jerome Croatian Catholic Church began in a significantly Croatian-American neighborhood. J. E. Quigley, Archbishop of Chicago, realizing the Croatian Catholic community's need for spiritual guidance and sustenance, requested the Holy See to send a Croatian priest to work among in Chicago. Father Leo Medić OFM, arrived in the U.S. in May 1912 was charged with the responsibility to form the new parish. He began by organizing about 5,000 immigrants from Dalmatia, Banovina, Istria, Slavonia and Bosnia and Herzegovina. The parish's original church and rectory were purchased from German Protestants located on 15th near Wentworth Ave. On December 5, 1912, the Croatian Parish was blessed and opened its doors for public worship. The beginnings of the church were not without some controversy as a dispute concerning whether to call the Church Croatian or Dalmatian required mediation. The Archbishop intervened and proclaimed St. Jerome as a Croatian Church.

As of 1997, the parish had a total of 1,050 parishioners. There were 168 students in the 8-grade grammar school, and the Croatian school had 50 students with 5 teachers. Father Ivica Majstorovic is the director of the Croatian school and Jennifer Kraljević is the current president. The parish grammar school has two nuns who teach and they are members of the Adorers of the Precious Blood, and the principal is a lay person. Besides the various groups who are traditionally associated with St. Jerome parish, there are 8 parish groups: Holy Name Society, St. Jerome's Auxiliary, The Altar and Rosary Group, Mary's Society, The dance and tamburica group "Kardinal Stepinac", Catholic War Veterans, and two church choirs, one led by Joseph Cepuran and the other by Mary Helen Ratković. The church bulletin is printed weekly in both Croatian and English. The first three pages contain parish information and the last page is various advertisements.

St. Jerome parish has published many keepsake books for the various anniversaries of the church and school, as well as books about the parish on an annual basis. One keepsake book released in 1932 by pastor Blaž Jerković contained photographs in addition to information.

== Priests ==
- 1912 - Father Leo Medić founded the parish and remained at St. Jerome until August 1916.
- 1916 - Father Ambrose Sirca (1916–1919) succeeded Friar Leo. He instituted the Holy Name Society that still functions today.
- 1919 - Father Placid Belavić, OFM was the third pastor at St. Jerome. He was pastor until 1921.*
- 1921 - Father Wenceslav Vukonić, OFM. He removed the original debt of the Church and purchased the present Church and rectory from Swedish Lutherans. The move took place was on Decoration Day in 1922. In the fall of 1922, Adorers of the Precious Blood of Jesus arrived to teach in the school of four grades. The first eighth grade graduation was in 1927 with 13 graduates.
- 1928 - Father Blasé Jerković, OFM was the fifth pastor at St. Jerome. Father Blasé purchased new bells for the Church and renovated the buildings. Due to the economic situation of the Depression, not much could be accomplished in the way of physical and financial prosperity. However, several parish societies flourished under Friar Blasé's direction: The Third Order of St. Francis (1929), Young Ladies Society (1930), Altar Society (1931), Children of Mary (1930), and a championship basketball team were all instituted under his guidance.

Father Blasé's assistants were Friar Gabro Cvitanović, Friar Ambrose Mišetić, Friar Anselm Slišković, Friar Hugolinus Feysz, and Friar Ferdinand Skoko. Bro. Aloysius Soldo was a member of the house staff.

- 1936 - Father Francis Čuturić, OFM succeeded Father Blasé. He was known for his eloquent sermons and purchasing the hall on 28th & Princeton. He also reduced the debt of the parish. During his pastorate Fathers T. Pehar, Bonaventure Bilandić, Cornelius Ravlić were his assistants.
- 1943 - Father Ferdinand Skoko. Because of the economic prosperity of the war years, the debt of the parish was cleared. After World War II, Catholic War Veterans and Ladies Auxiliary were formed under his pastorship. A new convent building was built and furnished in May 1953. Refacing of the Church was done in 1954. Assistants at this time were Charles Plese, Steve Raić, Berto Dragičević, Marcellus Čabo, and Dominic Čorić.
- 1955 - Father Serafin Vistica, OFM was pastor for one year.
- 1956 - Father Skoko was reappointed in 1956 with Father Vitomir Naletilić was his assistant.
- 1958 - Father Zvonko Mandurić's pastorate, he was faced with the deterioration of the school and hall and was the one to raise money to address his problem. During his tenure, permission was granted to the parish by Cardinal Meyer (1960) to build a new school, but Father Mandurić left St. Jerome before construction was to begin.
- 1961 - Father Naletilić. The old buildings were razed and the new school and hall was dedicated on September 24, 1961.
- 1965 - Father Steve Raić, OFM.
- 1967 - Father Theodore Benković.
- 1969 - Father Marko Kožina was named Pastor on June 20, 1969. He led the Church through the changes of Vatican II. The sanctuary of the Church was renovated with a large Crucifix suspended from the ceiling with a black marble altar. Through his guidance he added a fully equipped kitchen for school and hall use. Father Marko was known for his story-telling, a down to earth homiletic style, and his quick wit. He left St. Jerome as he was voted superior of the Croatian Franciscan Fathers. His associates were Ivan Bradvica, Ante Čuvalo, and Dominic Čorić.

Father Paul Maslač followed Fr. Mark. He endeared himself to the people with his easy going nature and willingness to work with people. Fr. Paul remodeled the rectory offices, made necessary changes for the kindergarten in the school, and placed new doors on the school. Fr. Leon Galić and Fr. Slavko Soldo were his associates.

- 1979 - Father Anthony Dukić became pastor. His gentle approach and kind words helped many parishioners. Under his administration, new doors with the Croatian Cross were placed on the Church, rooms were remodeled in the convent, and the Church underwent a new coat of paint. Fr Joe Čuić & Fr. Ljubo Krašić served as associates.
- 1982 - Father Jerome Kučan became pastor. He was known as being fair and social, and he continued with the necessary remodeling. He was also known for his sermons on the Church dogmas. Father Jerome was instrumental in receiving a statue of St. Leopold Amndić for the Church. The same year, Fr. Hrvoslav Ban (1982–1992), arrived as associate pastor. He was especially dedicated to the Croatian school, since he organized the Christmas and Mother's Day programs. His other responsibilities were preparing the "Catholic Messenger" (1986–1992) and the "Croatian Calendar" (1987–1992). In 1985, the keepsake book dedicated to Aloysius Stepinac, was published with the help of Fr. Ban and the teachers and school board. The book is quite valuable, since it has over 70 photographs of students of 1984/85, with their quotes about what it meant for them to be students of the Croatian school.
- 1985 - Father Matthew Ruyechan was appointed pastor. He was very close to his parishioners, especially the youth, because of his big heart and loving ways. Together with the associate pastor, Fr. Hrvoslav Ban, and the sisters, they prepared for the 75th anniversary of the parish in 1987. A keepsake book was published with photographs and information about the parish and its members since its founding. In 1992, the associate pastor Fr. Ban moved back to his beloved Croatia, and the associate pastors that followed him were Fr. Veselko Kvešić (1992), Fr. Miro Grubišić (1993–1994) and Fr. Marko Kožina (1994–1996). In 1995, Fr. Matthew took over as pastor at St Anthony's church in Sharon, Pennsylvania and Fr. Zvonimir Kutlesa became the new pastor until 1997. Upon his arrival, he brought his vast experience of remodeling the church facilities and most of the work is now complete. Father Jozo Grbeš became associate pastor in 1996. He is well known for his great energy and powerful homilies.
- 1997 - Father Jozo Grubišić became pastor and Father Zvonimir went to serve in Kitchener, Canada. The great task of remodeling the church awaited the two Fathers Jozos and the whole parish community. The plans were approved by the archdiocese. The work officially began in the summer of 1997 with the old stone being replaced and a new bell tower was erected. Above the center door the following was engraved: St. Jerome Croatian R.C. Parish.

Many special events took place during the time of the two Fathers Jozos. In September 1997, Father Jozo Zovko, from Međugorje, held a three-day retreat which culminated with the grand opening and blessing of the statue of Our Lady of Međugorje, which stands in the grotto between the school and convent. Other special events were the organization of a concert where guests from Samobor, Croatia put on a wonderful performance, the promotion of newly released books written by parishioners, a banquet and short program commemorating the 100th anniversary of the birth of Aloysius Stepinac, where Monsignor Juraj Batelja and Bishop Franjo Komarica from Zagreb honored the parish with their powerful presence for this special occasion.

- 2001 - Father Jozo Grbeš becomes pastor.
- 2013 - Fr. Ivica Majstorovic becomes pastor.
