= Calumet Fisheries =

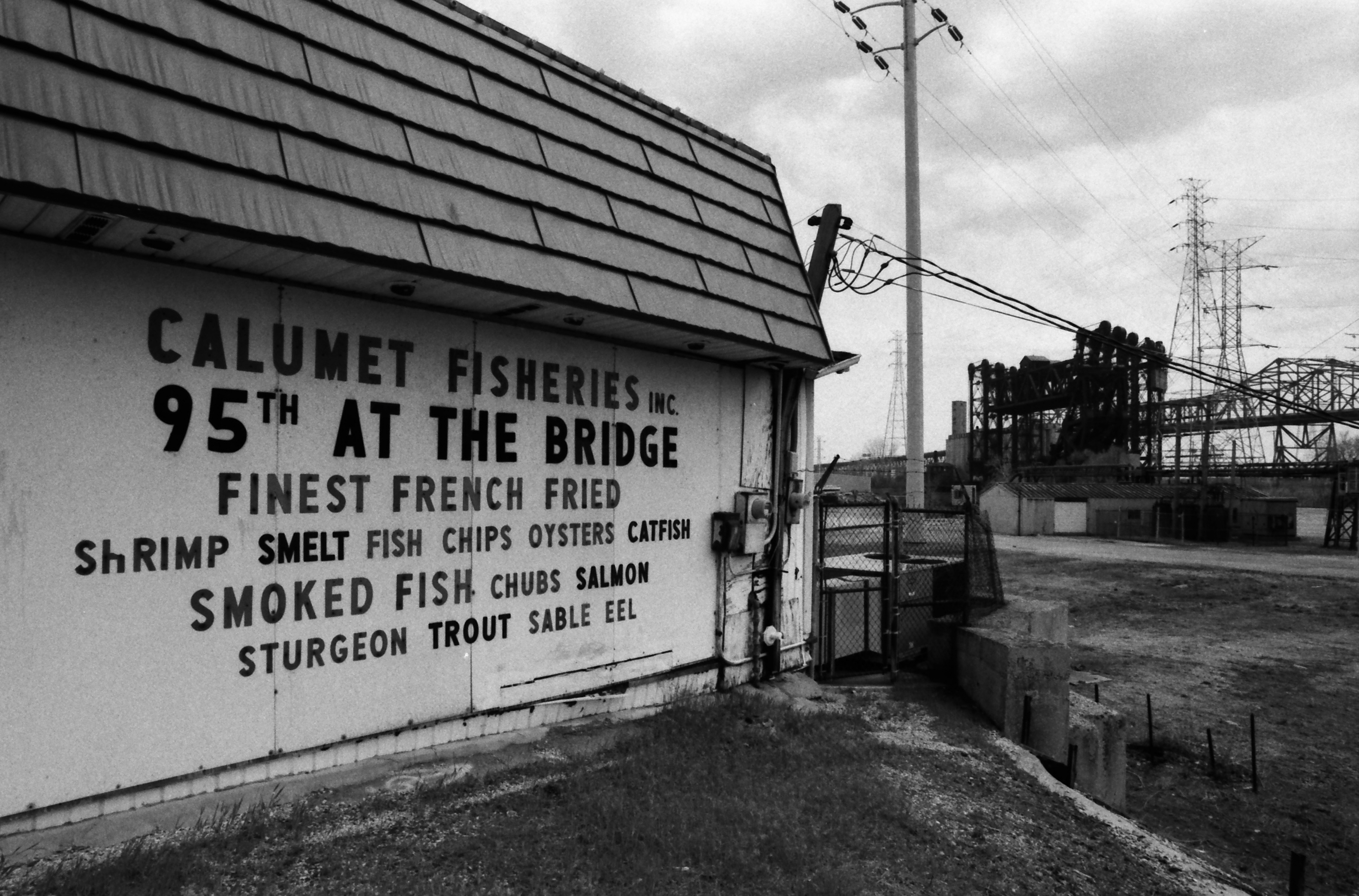
- Interactive map of Calumet Fisheries

Restaurant information
- Established: 1928
- Owner: Mark Kotlick
- Head chef: Javier Magallanes
- Chef: Christian Villarruel, Giovanni Rosas, Sergio Gonzalez
- Food type: Seafood
- Location: 3259 E. 95th Street, Chicago, Illinois, United States
- Coordinates: 41°43′21″N 87°32′38″W
- Website: www.calumetfisheries.com

Calumet Fisheries is a seafood restaurant in the South Deering neighborhood of Chicago, Illinois, United States, directly next to the 95th Street bridge (which appears in the 1980 film The Blues Brothers). It was originally established in 1928, and subsequently purchased in 1948 by Sid Kotlick and Len Toll. It serves smoked and fried fish, shrimp, and clams. The restaurant is often featured on TV shows and web series, such as Eater's Dining on a Dime and Anthony Bourdain: No Reservations. The building is a one-room shack with a counter and no seating. Patrons can take their food to go, or (more commonly) sit in their parked cars along 95th Street to eat.

== Smoking process ==
The restaurant uses a natural-wood smokehouse, which has been in use since establishment. The smoking process involves brining the fish overnight, before large fish (such as salmon, sturgeon, or sablefish) are usually cut into "steaks", threaded with string, and hung from a smoking rack. Some salmon are smoked whole. Wood fires are built in the bottom of the smokehouse and the fish are cooked with the doors open; when complete, the doors are closed and the fish are smoked. Shrimp, clam strips, and smaller fish such as lake chub are smoked by tacking to a plank.

== History ==
Smoked fish were popular in the 1940s and 1950s, when shipping and fishing boat traffic were heavy on Chicago's waterways. The business began a slow decline over the decades, as the neighborhood and economy changed, and fried seafood was introduced to generate more sales. Due to declining demand, the owners had considered ending smoking and focusing on frying, until they were featured on No Reservations; a few days after the episode aired, patrons were lined up out the door and down the street, and sales continue to increase.

The restaurant temporarily closed after an electrical fire in November 2023. It reopened in June 2024.

== Awards and honors ==
Calumet Fisheries was named by CNN as one of America's 10 best historic restaurants. In 2010, it received a James Beard Foundation Award.

== See also ==
- List of James Beard America's Classics
- List of seafood restaurants
