= Chicago Housing Authority Police Department =

Defunct police department within the Chicago Housing Authority

- Abbreviation: CHAPD

Agency overview
- Formed: October 30, 1989
- Dissolved: October 29, 1999

Jurisdictional structure
- Operations jurisdiction: Chicago, Illinois, U.S.
- Legal jurisdiction: Chicago Public Housing Developments
- Governing body: Chicago Housing Authority
- General nature: Civilian police

Facilities
- CHA Buildings: 365 W. Oak St. (Cabrini-Green Homes); 4848 S. State St. (Robert Taylor Homes); 4947 S. Federal St. (Robert Taylor Homes); 754 E. 37th Pl. (Ida B. Wells Homes); 1010 E. 132nd St. (Altgeld Gardens)

The Chicago Housing Authority Police Department (also known as the CHAPD) was created to provide police services to all Chicago Housing Authority public housing projects throughout the inner city of Chicago, Illinois and some suburban areas. It was formed as a supplement to the Chicago Police Department (CPD) to provide dedicated police services for low-income housing.

== History ==
The CHAPD was envisioned by Vince Lane, who had served as Chairman and Executive Director of the CHA from May 23, 1987 to May 26, 1995. During a television interview, Lane recalled how as a child he marveled at how well kept public housing was and remembered being envious of the conveniences residents enjoyed. As Chairman, Lane took a personal stance in rectifying the safety and living conditions of the residents by ushering in the repair of dilapidated low and high-rise buildings, combined with improved protective services for the inhabitants. Ensuring that his plan came to fruition did not come without obstacles. Lane's plan was in opposition to the Mayor's Advisory Council's report, which was printed by the Chicago Tribune in July 1988, and called for the razing of 8,000 units of family high-rise buildings over a ten-year period.

Complaints from the residents about the lack of police protection and presence of the Chicago Police Department, as well as the documented concerns of CPD officers who felt patrolling public housing was unsafe and dreaded answering calls for service there, went unanswered by the mayor, but were a major concern of Lane's.

Vince Lane's solution to combat the rampant gang-related drug sales and crime was to create his own police department to work within the system of the Chicago Police, but unhampered by the boundaries of CPD's assigned districts. Since public housing was spread throughout various neighborhoods and local suburbs, the CHAPD was endowed with a broader jurisdiction.

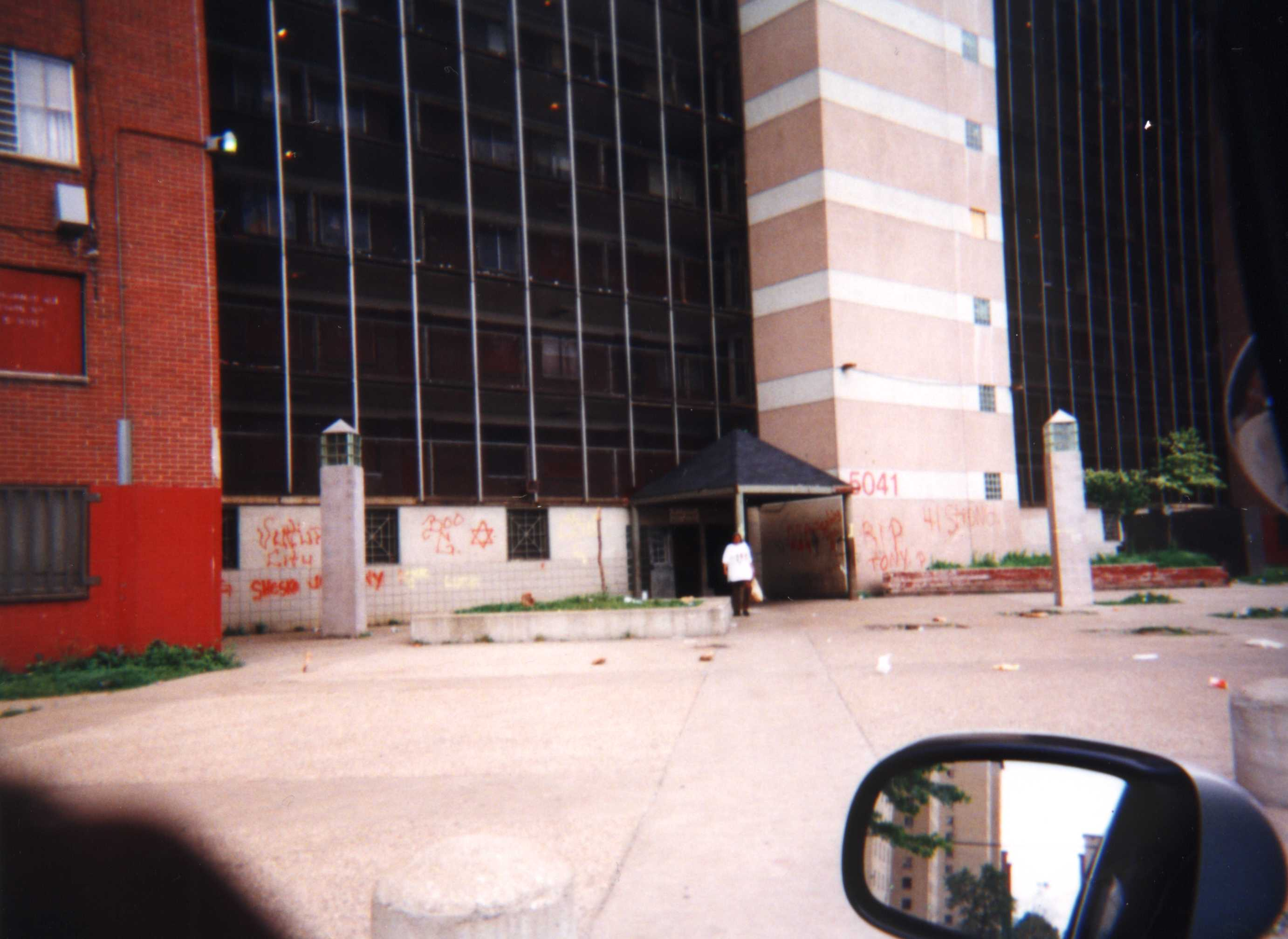
A CHAP officer on mobile patrol in the Robert Taylor Homes on the south side.

Previously the federal government paid the City of Chicago 13 million dollars a year for extra patrols to provide adequate protection for the residents of the CHA. The city posted CPD units within the building at 365 W. Oak Street for (Public Housing North) and 4848 S. State Street for (Public Housing South) almost twenty years prior to the coming of housing's own police. CHAPD's first station was located at 4947 S. Federal Street in CPD's 2nd District, which was also known as the "Deuce".

== Chiefs ==
There was a long line of leaders who served as chief from the department's beginnings in March 1989 until October 1999, as the Department grew and learned. Gary Gunther was named as CHAPD's first Chief of Police and was a retiree from the Illinois State Police. He was quickly followed by Madren Anderson, who was a District Commander for CPD's 2nd District, and Ira Harris. Both Gunther's and Anderson's reigns ended before the first class of police hit the street.

Harris served as chief until October 1991 and it was on his watch that CHAPD lost their only officer in the line of duty. Harris was succeeded by Hosea (Hosey) Crossley, who served from October 1991 to February 1994.

Crossley, former Commander of the Chicago Police Department's PHS unit, brought with him over twenty years of police experience and knowledge of the problems CPD faced in patrolling the housings environment. Although Hosey was respected and favored by his subordinates, he was in constant conflict with the Local Advisory Council (LAC) over officer safety issues.

Joe P. Mayo, Commander of CPD's Youth Division, served as Interim Chief from February 1994 to April 1994 and Commander of Administration under Chief George Murray of CHAPD.

Murray, a major with the Illinois State Police, took leave to become head of the CHAPD, was chief from April 1994 to November 1996. Murray established the Internal Investigations Unit and Youth Division within the CHAPD with Mayo's assistance. He expanded the C.O.P.S program by working with key leaders in the CHA which made a difference in improving community policing.

He was credited with reducing the budget and getting the CHA off the trouble public housing list in the United States by implementing a plan with dedicated policing prowess and positive sports programs; scouting, explorers, D.A.R.E., the Midnight Basketball league and softball teams, community events for residents. His tenure provided the most safety and harmony among residents. The Chicago Housing administration credited him for cleaning up the image of the CHAPD. However, there was always politics creating fires to be put out.

CPD Patrolman, Gang Crimes and PHS Tactical Team member Matthew Brandon also served as Deputy and Interim Chief from November to December 1996. Brandon had previously worked with many of the personnel he would later lead as chief and added to the CHAPD's aggressive edge in its war on gang violence.

On December 1, 1996, LeRoy O'Shield left his post as Commander of CPD's Austin District to become the eighth Chief of Police for the CHAPD. O'Shield's thirty years of experience, support for esteemed building programs for youth and community-oriented policing background led CHA Administration to believe that he would be instrumental in improving relations with the residents and serve as the bridge for better co-operation between the CHAPD and CPD, which proved not to be the case. LeRoy O'Shield and Harvey Radney were the last two to be appointed as Chief under the direction of the Mayor and control of CHA by the City of Chicago.

== Structure and Ranks ==
Chicago Housing Authority Police Department was divided into Operations Services, Administrative Services, Investigative Services and the C.O.P.S. Team. There were five police districts, (Robert Taylor, ABLA, Ida B. Wells, Altgeld Gardens and Cabrini–Green), each led by a Commander who oversaw their own stations. Commanders reported to the Deputy Chief, who reported to the Chief of Police who in turn was subject to the authority of the Chairman of Public Housing before the Mayor and the City of Chicago regained control in the later years.

- Chief of Police (Four Silver Five-Pointed Stars).
- Deputy Chief (Three Silver Five-Pointed Stars).
- Commander (Gold Oak Leaf).
- Captain (Two Silver Bars).
- Lieutenant, Inspector (One Silver Bar for Lieutenant).
- Sergeant (Three Chevrons).
- Corporal (Two Chevrons)
- FTO (Field Training Officer)
- Police Officer Assigned (as Patrol Specialist, Investigator, Gang Crime Specialist, COPS Team Member, Bike Patrol, ATV Unit Officer, K-9 Officer, Evidence and *Recovered Property Section Officer and basic Patrolman/Police Officer.)

=== Investigative Services and Patrol Division ===
Investigative functions were under the Internal Inspections Unit. Organized crime was combatted by the Narcotic and Gang Crimes Investigations members of the Tactical units, Special Operations unit, DEA, Warrant Unit, B.I.T.E., Bike Unit and FBI task force members. All CHAPD units coordinated their efforts of patrol within the following CPD detective areas: Area 1 (Wentworth) and Area 2 (Calumet) covers the south and southwest sides, while Area 3 (Belmont), Area 4 (Harrison) and Area 5 (Grand Central) covers the north, west and northwest sides of the city. The Patrol division included Vehicle and Foot Patrol, Patrol Specialists, COPS Team Members, D.A.R.E. Officers, Juvenile Officers, Bike Patrol, ATV Unit Officers, Abandon Auto Unit, ERPS Officers, B.I.T.E., Canine Unit and (prior to its demise) Warrant Unit.

== Demographics ==
=== Sex ===
- Male: 92%
- Female: 8%

=== Race ===
- White: 16%
- African-American/Black: 80%
- Hispanic: 3%
- Asian: 1%

== Community Oriented Policing Strategy (COPS) ==
Although the CPD is often credited for advancing community policing through the Chicago Alternative Policing Strategy, or (CAPS) program, it was the Chicago Housing Authority Police Department who pioneered the advance of these techniques in the City of Chicago through their Community Oriented Policing Strategy, or (COPS) program, in public housing years before it was implemented by Chicago Police Superintendent Matt L. Rodriguez. The COPS Team was created as a special unit to establish a rapport with the residents of public housing that the regularly assigned mobile and foot patrols units that answered calls for service could not.

Because of the design of the buildings, clusters of row houses, three story dwellings, or varying high-rise structures, CHAPD's COPS team members were encouraged to engage this densely populated community on a daily basis. It was the mandate of the COPS Team to instill a constant sense of security in the residents that would not end when patrol units left the area. The COPS Team was involved in sporting programs, monitored parks so kids could play, recreations such as the Midnight Basketball league, during and after school events, scouting, Explorer posts, trips with local youths and worked to build relationships unrelated to arrest and detainment. Bicycles and All Terrain Vehicles (ATV) were also utilized to place officers in close contact. The presence and accessibility of the COPS Team stop discourse between the community leaders and forced truces so the kids could play again. Relationships with the Local Advisory Council (LAC) improved, and better initiatives were implemented to deter crimes. The COPS Team regularly attended the CPD Beat Community Meetings to allow community members to become familiar and more comfortable with the officers in an attempt to make the police more approachable when they need to ask for help.

== Salaries ==
Starting salary for CHA police officers was $29,104 in 1990 and increased to $49,723 over the next eight years. The average patrolman's salary was $3,000 more a year than CPD's officers. Although it caused animosity between the two departments, the higher salary received by CHAPD officers proved to be a valuable tool when the Fraternal Order of Police union bargained for higher salaries for the CPD with the city. In 2017, a starting salary for the CPD is $48,078, increasing to $68,616 after one year.

== Line of Duty death ==
From October 30, 1989, to October 29, 1999, the CHAPD lost only one officer in the line of duty. On Saturday, August 17, 1991, Jimmie Lamar Haynes died after being fatally wounded by sniper fire from a high-powered rifle at the Robert Taylor Homes two days earlier. A massive manhunt, including early morning sweeps of several buildings, led to the arrest of three suspects; Ellean Nance, 20, Lorenzo Guye, 18 and a 13-year-old boy.

== See also ==
- List of law enforcement agencies in Illinois
