= Chicago Housing Authority =

Municipal corporation that oversees public housing in Chicago, Illinois, United States

Chicago Housing Authority (CHA)

Agency overview
- Formed: 1937; 89 years ago
- Jurisdiction: City of Chicago
- Headquarters: 60 E. Van Buren Street Chicago, Illinois, U.S.
- Annual budget: $976 million (2015)
- Agency executive: Keith Pettigrew, Chief Executive Officer
- Website: thecha.org

The Chicago Housing Authority (CHA) is a municipal corporation that oversees public housing within the city of Chicago. The agency's Board of Commissioners is appointed by the city's mayor, and has a budget independent from that of the city of Chicago. CHA is the largest rental landlord in Chicago, with more than 50,000 households. CHA owns over 21,000 apartments (9,200 units reserved for seniors and over 11,400 units in family and other housing types). It also oversees the administration of 37,000 Section 8 vouchers. The current CEO is Keith Pettigrew.

== History ==
The CHA was created in 1937 to own and operate housing built by the federal government's Public Works Administration. In addition to providing affordable housing for low-income families and combating blight, it also provided housing for industry workers during World War II and returning veterans after the war. By 1960, it was the largest landlord in Chicago. In 1965, a group of residents sued the CHA for racial discrimination. After the landmark court decision Gautreaux v. Chicago Housing Authority (see below), the CHA was placed in receivership, which would last for more than 20 years. Things continued to deteriorate for the agency and its residents, and by the 1980s, the high concentrations of poverty and neglected infrastructure were severe.

The Chicago Housing Authority Police Department was created in 1989 to provide dedicated policing for what had become one of the most impoverished and crime-ridden housing developments in the country, and was dissolved only ten years later. The situation was so dire that the entire CHA board of commissioners resigned in 1995, effectively handing over control of the agency to Housing and Urban Development. After an extensive overhaul, management of the CHA was returned to a new board of commissioners, including three residents appointed by resident groups, in 1999. The previously ordered receivership ended in 2010.

=== Chief Executive Officers (1937–present) ===
Chief Executive Officers
| Name | Term | Appointed by | Cite |
|---|---|---|---|
| Elizabeth Wood | 1937 – 23 August 1954 | Edward Kelly | |
| William B. Kean | 1 October 1954 – 14 August 1957 | Edward Kelly | |
| Alvin E. Rose | 1 September 1957 – 26 November 1967 | Richard J. Daley | |
| Clement Humphrey | 2 December 1967 – 1 July 1973 | Richard J. Daley | |
| Harry J. Schneider | 1 July 1973 – 1975 | Richard J. Daley | |
| G. W. Master | August 1975 – April, 1976 (acting); May 1976 – 1 October 1979 | Richard J. Daley | |
| Charles R. Swibel | 15 October 1979 – June 1981 | Jane Byrne | |
| Andrew Mooney | June 1981 – 26 July 1982 (acting); 1 August 1982 – 1 May 1983 | Jane Byrne | |
| Zirl N. Smith | 30 May 1983 – 7 January 1987 | Harold Washington | |
| Brenda J. Gaines | 7 January 1987 – 6 May 1988 (acting) | Harold Washington | |
| Vincent Lane | 6 May 1988 – 30 May 1995 | Eugene Sawyer | |
| Joseph Shuldiner | 30 May 1995 – September 1995 (acting); 16 October 1995 – 1 June 1999 | HUD | |
| Terry Peterson | 1 June 1999 – 30 August 2006 | Richard M. Daley | |
| Sharon Gist-Gilliam | 31 August 2006 – 16 January 2008 (acting) | Richard M. Daley | |
| Lewis Jordan | 16 January 2008 – 30 June 2011 | Richard M. Daley | |
| Charles Woodyard | 24 October 2011 – 15 October 2013 | Rahm Emanuel | |
| Michael Merchant | 16 October 2013 – 5 June 2015 | Rahm Emanuel | |
| Eugene Jones | 8 June 2015 – 10 September 2019 (acting CEO 8 June 2015 — 6 February 2016) | Rahm Emanuel | |
| James L. Bebley | 17 September 2019 – 30 March 2020 (acting) | —N/a | |
| Tracey Scott | 30 March 2020 – present | Lori Lightfoot | |

== Redevelopment ==
=== Plan for Transformation (2000) ===
In 2000, the CHA began its "Plan For Transformation", which called for the demolition of all of its gallery high-rise buildings and proposed a renovated housing portfolio totaling 25,000 units. While demolition began almost immediately, CHA was slow to develop mixed-income housing or provide Section 8 vouchers as planned.

=== Plan Forward (2013) ===
In April 2013, CHA created "Plan Forward"the next phase of redeveloping public housing in Chicago. The plan includes the rehabilitation of other scattered-site, senior, and lower-density properties; construction of mixed-income housing; increasing economic sales around CHA developments; and providing educational and job training to residents with Section 8 vouchers.

In 2015, the Secretary of Housing and Urban Development criticized the Chicago Housing Authority for accumulating a cash reserve of $440 million at a time when more than a quarter million people were on the agency's waiting list for affordable housing, and a large number of units (16%) remained vacant. By March 2017, only 8% of the 17,000 demolished households had been replaced with mixed-income units. Many lots remain vacant decades after demolition, and the CHA has been selling, leasing, or trading land in gentrifying neighborhoods to other government agencies and the private sector for less than market value. Land owned by the CHA has been used to build two Target stores, a private tennis complex, and government facilities at a time when over 30,000 people are awaiting mixed-income housing assistance from the CHA. One notable resident, Chicago alderwoman Jeanette Taylor, revealed that she applied for assistance as a single mother in 1993 and received an approval letter almost thirty years later in May 2022.

More than 20 years after the initial plan was announced, then-Chicago mayor Lori Lightfoot announced in June 2021 that finishing the redevelopment of Cabrini-Green alone will take at least another 12 years and could total upwards of $1 billion.

As of late 2024, the agency is still struggling to keep up with its pledges to rehab vacant homes and maintain their units. Reports of rodents, mold, water leaks, and broken equipment go unresolved for months or years, even after privatization of property management. Only a few dozen homes have been refurbished. The CHA has acknowledged they need to do better and has said their 2025 budget includes money for "investments in occupied public housing units, including updates to fixtures, flooring, appliances, hot water tanks, furnaces and appliances where replacements are required.”

== Demographics ==
From its beginning until the late-1950s, most families that lived in Chicago housing projects were Italian immigrants. By the mid-1970s, 65% of the agency's housing projects were made up of African Americans. In 1975, a study showed that traditional mother and father families in CHA housing projects were almost non-existent and 93% of the households were headed by single females. In 2010, the head of households demographics were 88% African American and 12% White. The population of children in CHA decreased from 50% in 2000 to 35% by 2010. Today on average, a Chicago public housing development is made up of: 69% African-American, 27% Latino, and 4% White and Other.

== Lawsuits ==
=== Gautreaux v. Chicago Housing Authority ===
In 1966, Dorothy Gautreaux and other CHA residents brought a suit against the CHA in Gautreaux v. Chicago Housing Authority. The suit charged racial discrimination by the housing authority for concentrating 10,000 public housing units in isolated Black neighborhoods. It claimed that the CHA and Housing and Urban Development (HUD) had violated the U.S. Constitution and the 1964 Civil Rights Act. It was a long-running case that in 1987 resulted in HUD taking over the CHA for over 20 years and the formation of the Gautreaux Project in which public housing families were relocated to the suburbs. The lawsuit was noted as the nation's first major public housing desegregation lawsuit.

On July 31, 2024 U.S. District Judge Marvin Aspen approved a jointly-proposed Amendment to the 2019 Settlement Agreement between the Chicago Housing Authority (CHA) and Impact for Equity (IFE) in the landmark 1966 Gautreaux v. Chicago Housing Authority federal lawsuit. With this joint Amendment, CHA and IFE have agreed and acknowledged that CHA has completed nearly all commitments from the 2019 Settlement Agreement.

The amendment outlines the remaining requirements at six CHA developments: Altgeld Gardens, Lakefront Properties, Madden/Wells, Rockwell Gardens, Stateway Gardens, and Robert Taylor Homes. At each of the six sites, certain terms of the 2019 Settlement Agreement will remain in place up to three additional years, or less time if the parties agree that CHA has completed the requirements sooner. All other terms expired on July 31, 2024.

=== Other lawsuits ===
In May 2013, The Cabrini–Green Local Advisory Council and former residents of the Cabrini–Green Homes sued the housing authority for reneging on promises for the residents to return the neighborhood after redevelopment. The suit claimed that the housing authority at the time had only renovated a quarter of the remaining row-houses, making only a small percentage of them public housing.

In September 2015, four residents sued the housing authority over utility allowances. Residents claimed the CHA overcharged them for rent and didn't credit them for utility costs.

In June 2023, Several groups including the Chicago Housing Initiative and the Lugenia Burns Hope Center sued CHA of illegally planning to lease public housing land at the former ABLA Homes to Joe Mansueto, one of then-Chicago Mayor Lori Lightfoot's campaign donors to build a training complex for his professional soccer team Chicago Fire.

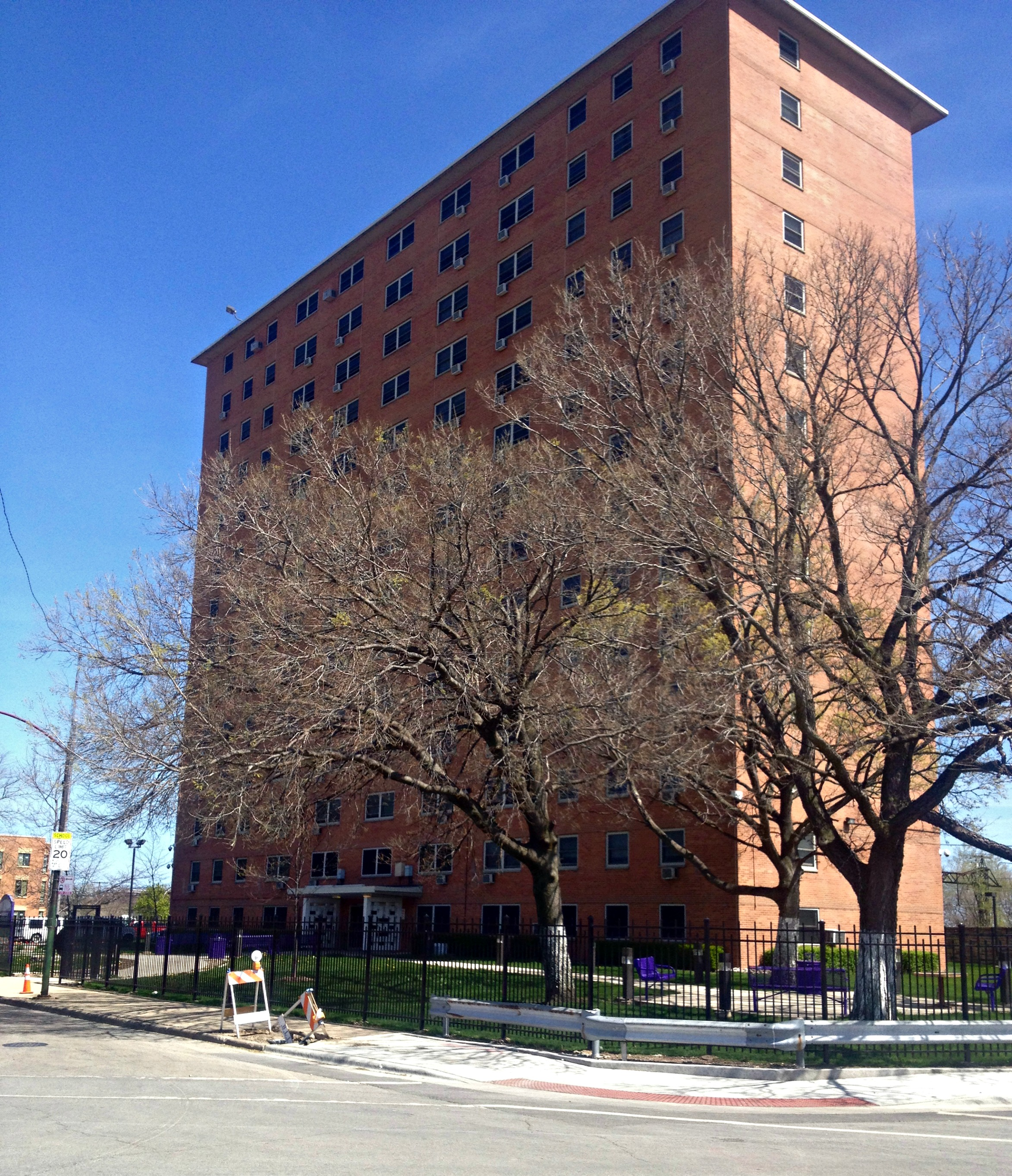
Harsh Apartments in the North Kenwood-Oakland neighborhood.

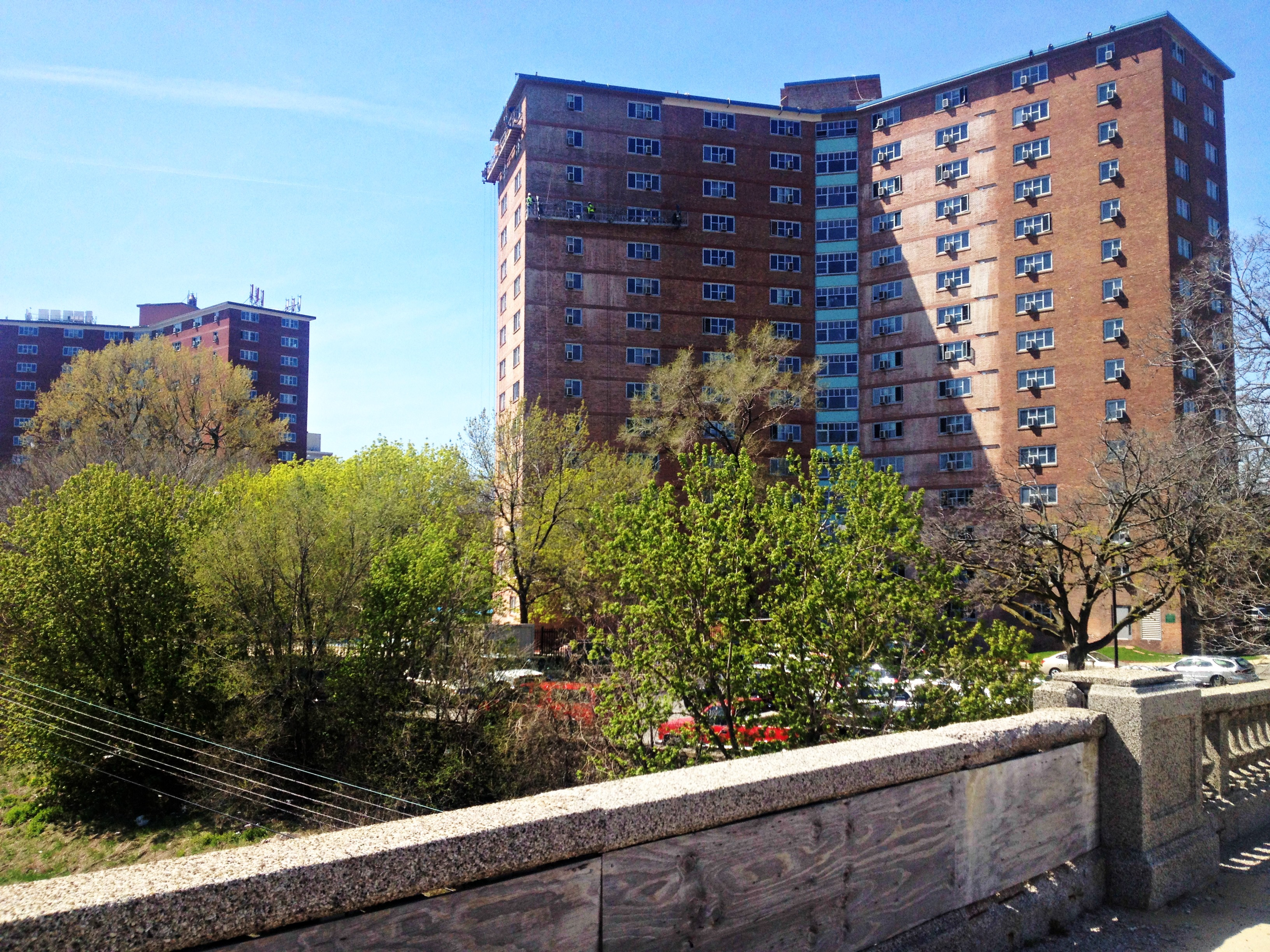
Lake Parc Place apartments high-rise buildings undergoing renovation.

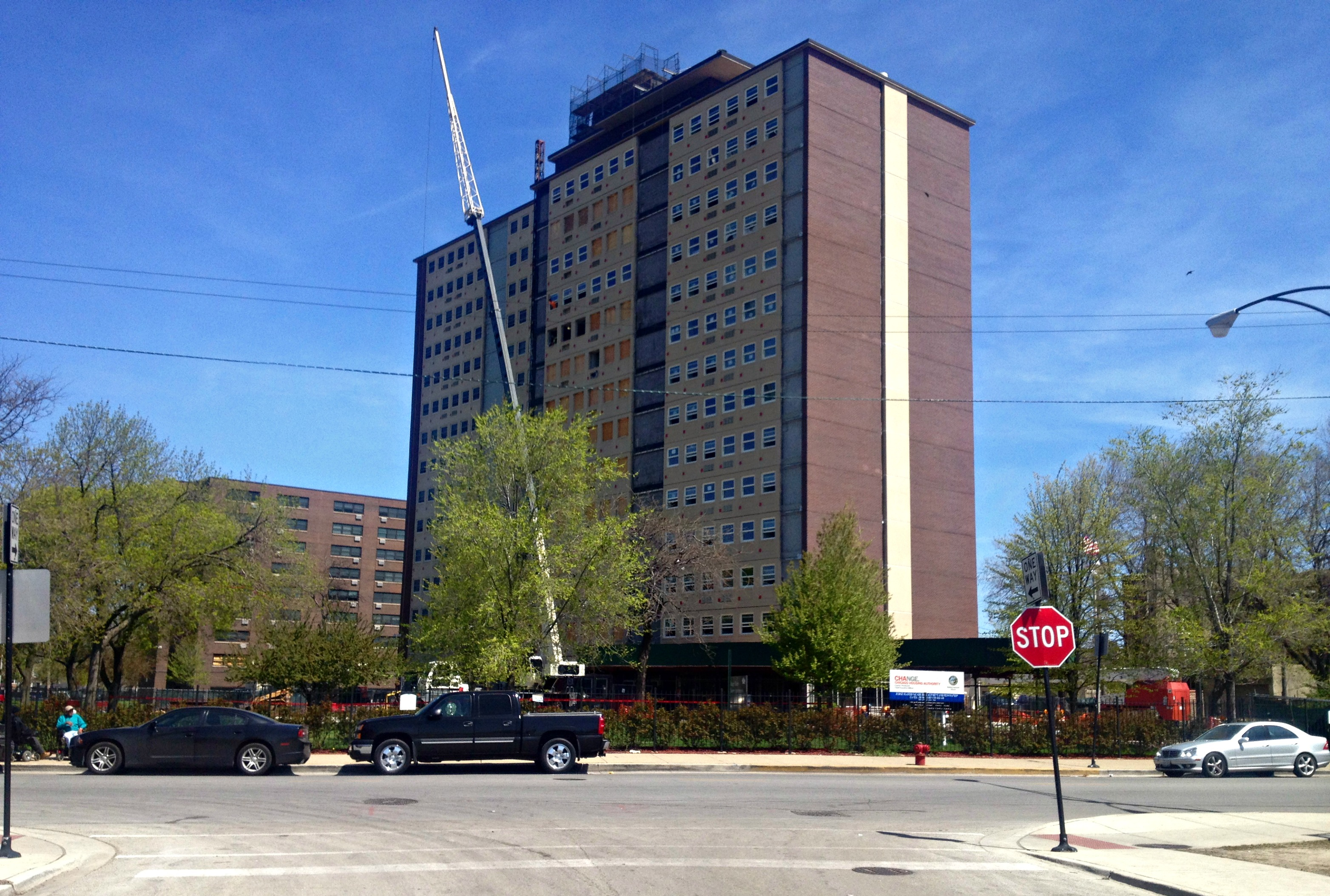
Judge Slater Apartments in the Bronzeville neighborhood.

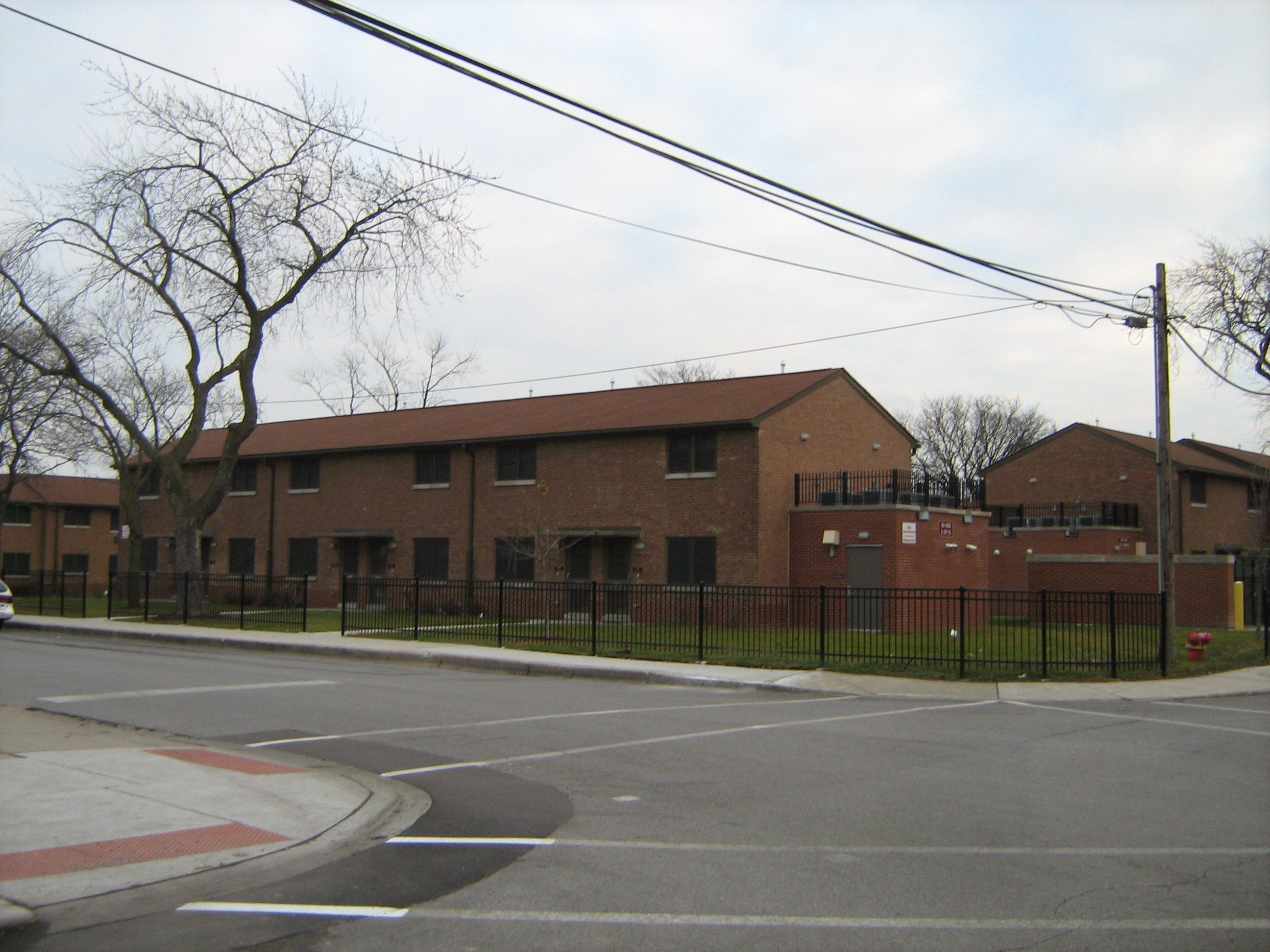
Altgeld Gardens Homes housing project in Riverdale, Illinois.

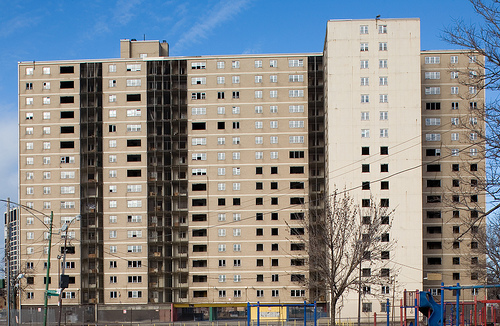
Stateway Gardens housing project in Bronzeville neighborhood.

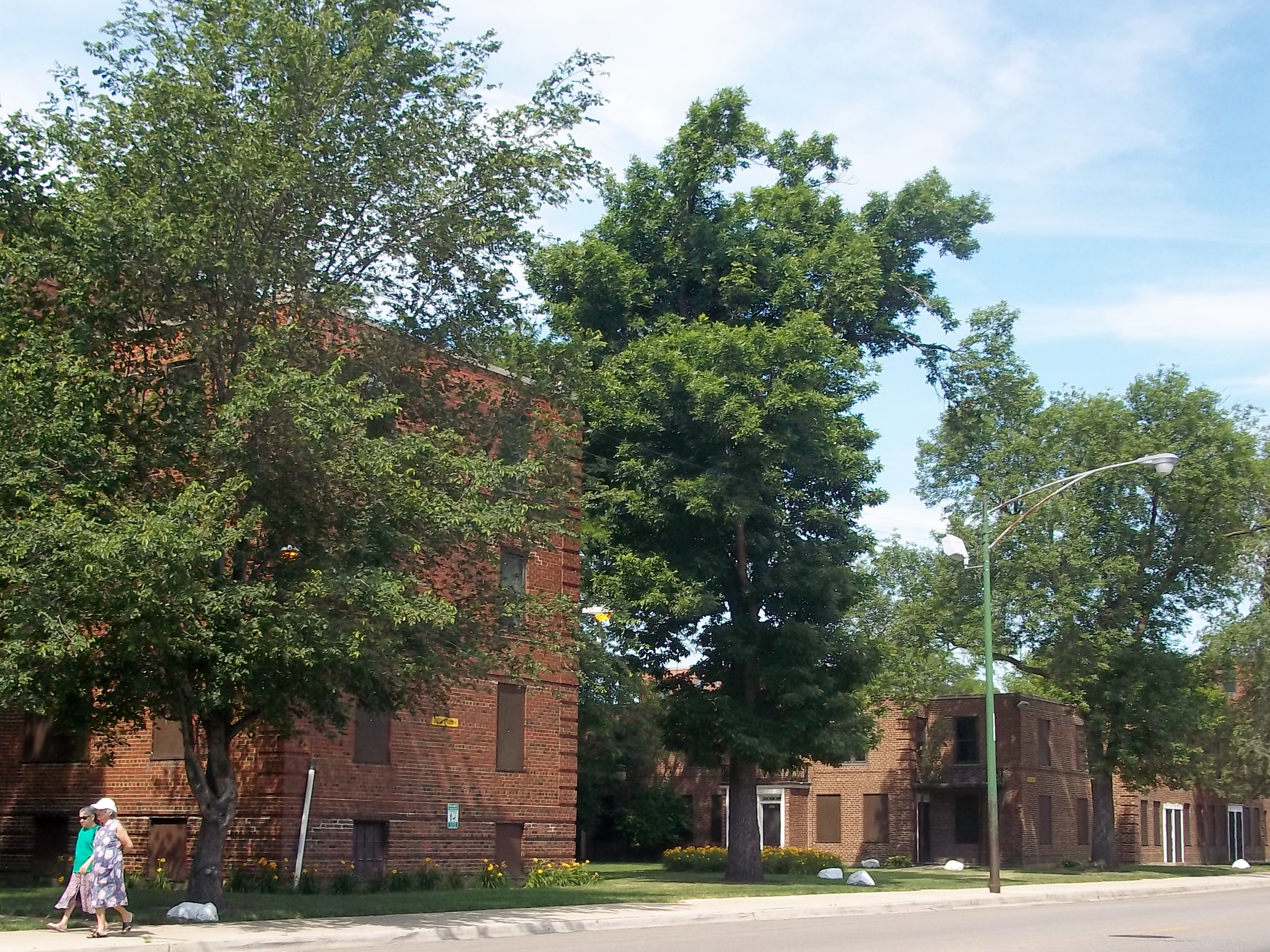
Lathrop Homes in the North Center neighborhood.

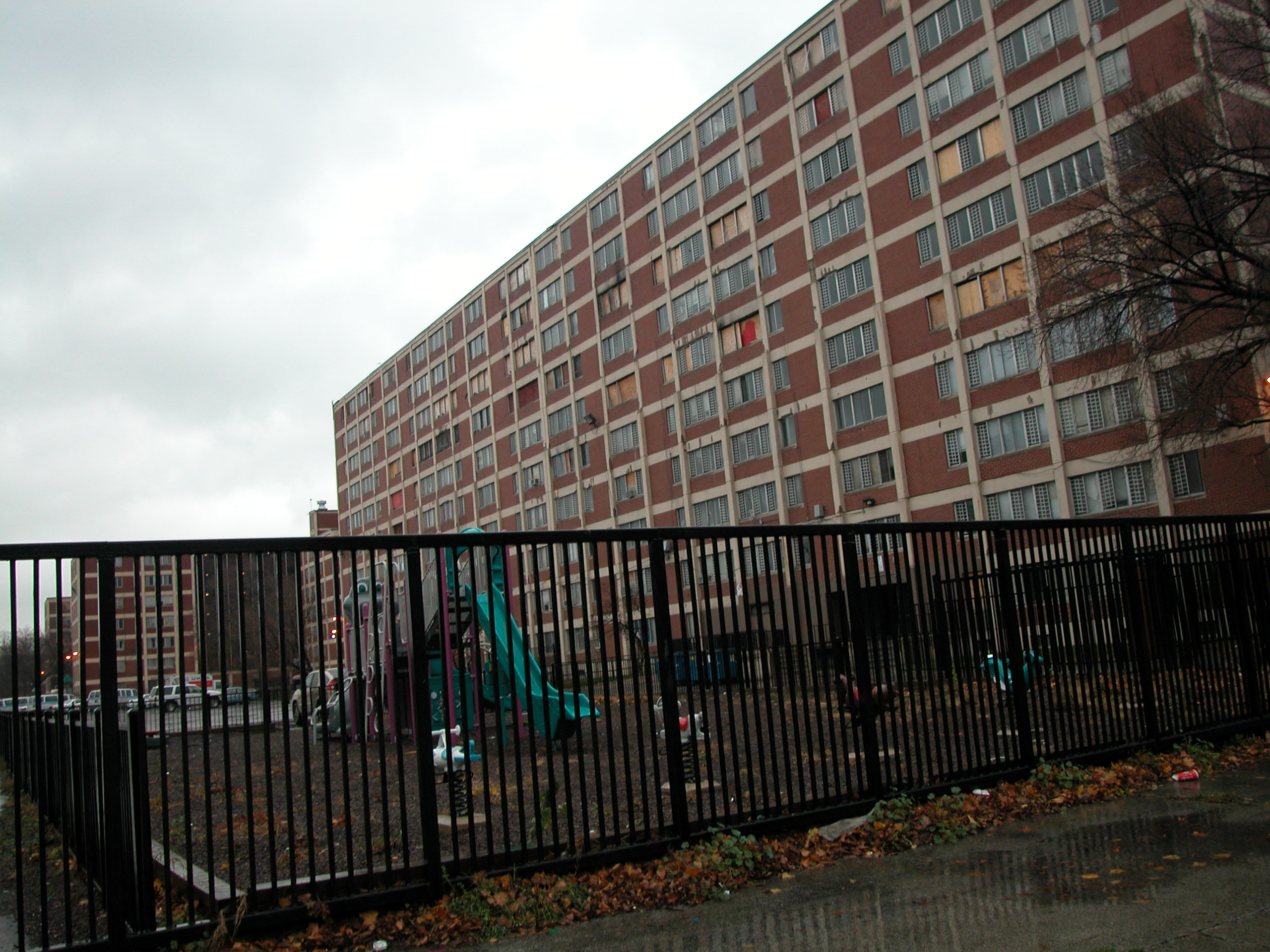
A Cabrini–Green housing project building in the Near-North neighborhood.

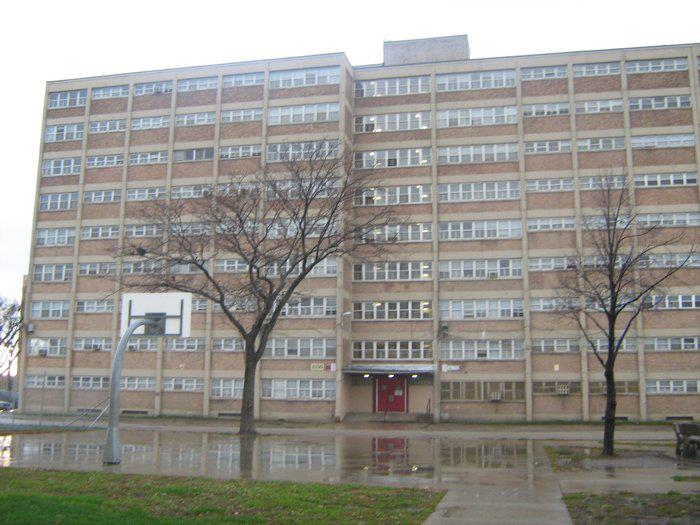
Harold Ickes Homes in the Near South Side neighborhood.

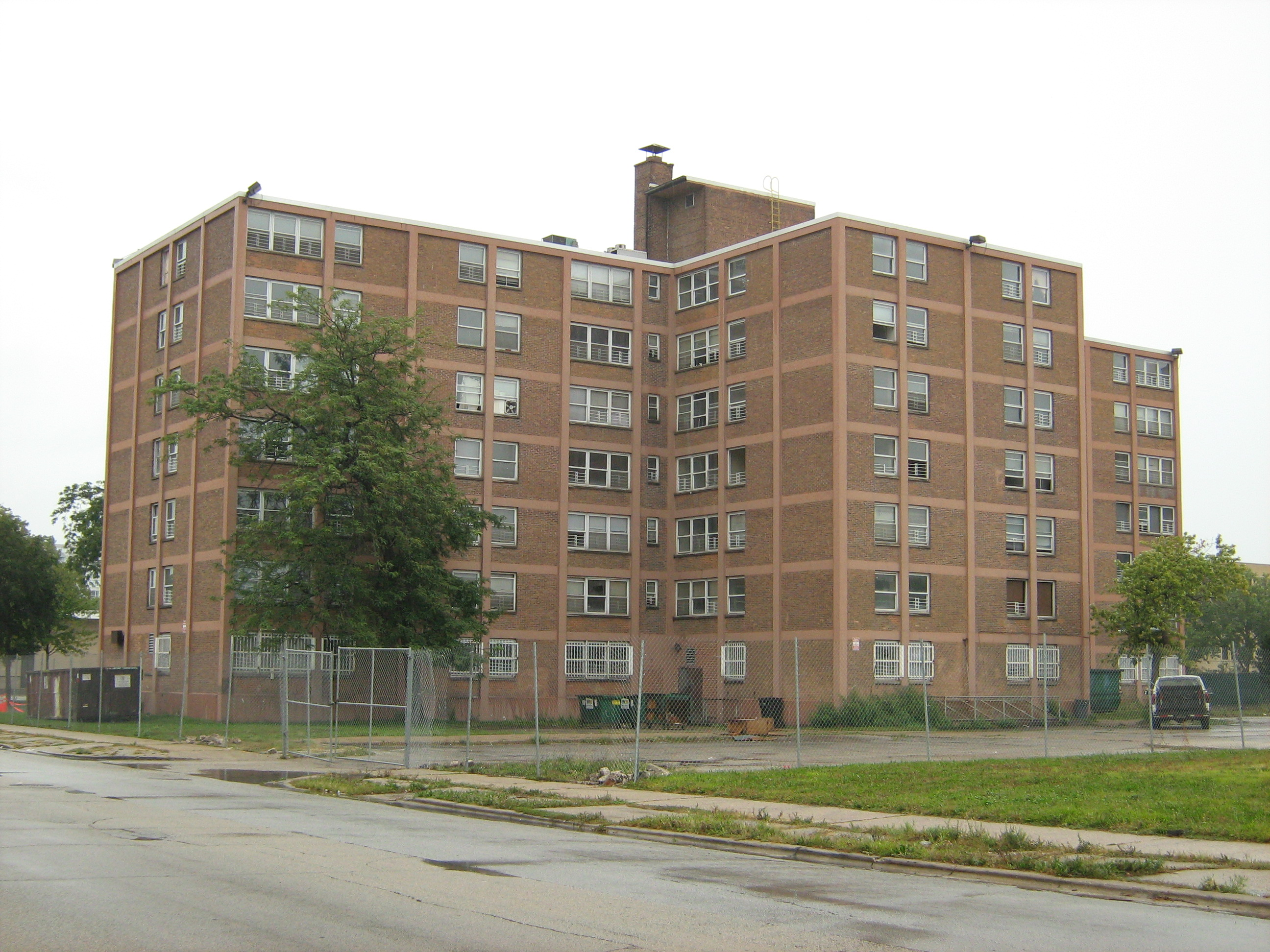
Ida B. Wells Homes extension building in the Bronzeville neighborhood.

== CEO Salary Increase and Land Lease Controversy ==
In the summer of 2023, the Chicago Housing Authority (CHA) board approved a significant salary increase for its CEO, Tracey Scott, raising her annual compensation to $300,000. This raise, supported by the CHA board, notably exceeds the federal salary cap for public housing authority executives, which is set at $176,300 according to the 2022 Appropriations Act. Lori Lightfoot, who had appointed Scott to the CEO position, was also involved in the decision. The approval of this substantial salary boost attracted considerable scrutiny due to its deviation from federal guidelines designed to regulate executive compensation within public agencies.

The controversy surrounding the raise was compounded by a related issue involving the Chicago Fire FC's lease of 23 acres on the Near West Side. The land, long reserved for housing by federal regulations, was leased to the Fire, which is owned by billionaire business leader and Lightfoot campaign donor Joe Mansueto, for at least 40 years to build a new soccer training facility. Federal law mandates that any such lease or sale must serve the "best interest" of low-income residents, raising questions about whether the deal aligned with this requirement and fueling broader criticism of the CHA's decisions and priorities.

== Developments ==
=== Housing projects ===
| Name | Neighborhood | Constructed | Notes/status |
|---|---|---|---|
| Altgeld Gardens Homes | Riverdale (Far South Side) | 1944–46; 1954 | Named for Illinois politician John Peter Altgeld and Labor movement leader Philip Murray. 1,971 units of 2-story row houses; renovated. |
| Bridgeport Homes | Bridgeport (Southwest Side) | 1943–44 | Named after its neighborhood location, consist of 115 units of 2-story row houses, renovated. |
| Cabrini–Green Homes | Near North Side | 1942–45; 1957–62 | Named for Italian nun Frances Cabrini and William Green. Consisted of 3,607 units, William Homes and Cabrini Extensions (demolished; 1995–2011), Francis Cabrini row houses (150 of 586 renovated; 2009–11). |
| Clarence Darrow Homes | Bronzeville (South Side) | 1961–62 | Named for American lawyer Clarence Darrow, consisted of 4 18-story buildings, demolished in late 1998. Replaced with Oakwood Shores, a mixed-income housing development. |
| Dearborn Homes | Bronzeville (South Side) | 1949–50 | Named for its location on Dearborn Street; consists of 12 buildings made up of mid-rise, 6 and 9-stories, totaling 668 units, renovated. |
| Grace Abbott Homes | University Village (Near West Side) | 1952–55 | Named for social worker Grace Abbott, consisted of 7 15-story buildings and 33 2-story row houses, totaling 1,198 units. Demolished. |
| Harold Ickes Homes | Bronzeville (South Side) | 1953–55 | Named for Illinois politician Harold L. Ickes; 11 9-story high-rise buildings, totaling 738 units; demolished. |
| Harrison Courts | East Garfield Park (West Side) | 1958 | Named after its street location; consists of 4 7-story buildings; renovated. |
| Ogden Courts | North Lawndale (West Side) | 1953 | Named after William B. Ogden; consisted of 2 7-story buildings; demolished. |
| Henry Horner Homes | Near West Side | 1955–57; 1959–61 | Named for Illinois governor Henry Horner, consisted of 16 high-rise buildings, 2 15-story buildings, 8 7-story buildings, 4 14-story and 2 8-story buildings, totaling 1,655 units; demolished. Replaced with West Haven, a mixed-income housing development. |
| Ida B. Wells Homes | Bronzeville (South Side) | 1939–41 | Named for African-American journalist Ida B. Wells, consisted of 1,662 units (800 row houses and 862 mid-rise apartments); demolished. Replaced with Oakwood Shores, a mixed-income housing development. |
| Jane Addams Homes | University Village (Near West Side) | 1938–39 | Named for social worker Jane Addams, consisted of 32 buildings of 2, 3, and 4 stories, totaling 987 units; demolished. Replaced with townhouses and condominiums under the name Roosevelt Square. |
| Julia C. Lathrop Homes | North Center (North Side) | 1937–38 | Named for social reformer Julia Lathrop, consists of 925 units made up of 2-story row houses, mid-rise buildings; renovated. |
| Lake Parc Place/Lake Michigan High-Rises | Oakland (South Side) | 1962–63 | Named after its location, consisted of 6 buildings; Lake Michigan high-rises (also known as Lakefront Homes; 4 16-story buildings; vacated in 1985 and demolished by implosion on 12/12/1998) and Lake Parc Place (2 15-story buildings; renovated) |
| Lawndale Gardens | Little Village (Southwest Side) | April–December 1942 | Named for its street location, consists of 123 units of 2-story row houses, renovated. |
| LeClaire Courts | Archer Heights (Southwest Side) | 1949–50; 1953–54 | Consisted of 314 units of 2-story row houses; demolished. |
| Loomis Courts | University Village (Near West Side) | 1951 | Named for its street location, consists of 2 7-story buildings, totaling 126 units. |
| Lowden Homes | Princeton Park (South Side) | 1951–52 | Named for Illinois governor Frank Lowden, consist of 127 units of 2-story row houses; renovated. |
| Madden Park Homes | Bronzeville (South Side) | 1968–69; 1970 | Consisted of 6 buildings (9 and 3 stories), totaling 279 units; demolished. Replaced with Oakwood Shores, a mixed-income housing development. |
| Prairie Courts | South Commons (South Side) | 1950–52 | Consisted of 5 7- and 14-story buildings, 230 units made up of row houses, totaling 877 units; demolished. Replaced with new development which was constructed between 2000–2002. |
| Racine Courts | Washington Heights (Far South Side) | 1953 | Named for its street location, Consisted of 122 units made up of 2-story row-houses. Demolished. |
| Raymond Hilliard Homes | Near South Side | 1964–66 | Consists of 3 buildings, 22-story building; 16-story building and 11-story building, totaling 1,077 units. Renovated in phases, Phase I: 2003–04; Phase II: 2006–07. |
| Robert Brooks Homes/Extensions | University Village (Near West Side) | 1942–43; 1960–61 | Consist of 835 row-houses (Reconstructed in phases: Phase I: 1997–99, Phase II: 2000), 3 16-story buildings (450 units; demolished between 1998–2001). |
| Robert Taylor Homes | Bronzeville (South Side) | 1960–62 | Named for the first African American chairman of the Chicago Housing Authority Robert Rochon Taylor, consisted of 28 16–story high rises, totaling 4, 415 units; demolished between 1998–2007. Replaced with Legends South, a mixed-income housing development. |
| Rockwell Gardens | East Garfield Park (West Side) | 1958–60 | Named for its street location; consisted of 1,126 units made up of 11 buildings (16- and 14-story); demolished between 2003–2007. Replaced with West End, a mixed-income housing development. |
| Stateway Gardens | Bronzeville (South Side) | 1955–58 | Named for its location along State Street, consisted of 8 buildings (13–17 stories); demolished between 1996–2007, replaced with Park Boulevard, a mixed-income housing development. |
| Trumbull Park Homes | South Deering (Far South Side) | 1938–39 | Consists of 434 units made up of 2-story row houses and 3-story buildings; renovated. |
| Wentworth Gardens | Armour Square (South Side) | 1944–45 | Named for its street location and the major league baseball team that used to play at its baseball field. Stretching from 39th & Wentworth to 37th and Wells. Consists of a 4 block area of 2-story row-houses, 3 mid-rise buildings; renovated. |
| Washington Park Homes | Bronzeville (South Side) | 1962–64 | Named for nearby Chicago Park District park and neighborhood, consisted of 5 17-story buildings located between 45th and 44th Streets, Cottage Grove Avenue and Evans Street; demolished between 1999 and mid-2002. |

=== Other housing ===
In addition to the traditional housing projects, CHA has 51 senior housing developments, 61 scattered site housing and 15 mixed-income housing developments.

== Notable residents ==
- R. Kelly – Ida B. Wells Homes
- Mr. T – Robert Taylor Homes
- Maurice Cheeks – Robert Taylor Homes
- Curtis Mayfield – Cabrini–Green Homes
- Eric Monte – Cabrini–Green Homes
- Jerry Butler – Cabrini–Green Homes
- Kirby Puckett – Robert Taylor Homes
- Deval Patrick – Robert Taylor Homes
- Marvin Smith – Robert Taylor Homes
- Lou Rawls – Ida B. Wells Homes

== See also ==
- Hills v. Gautreaux, a 1976 Supreme Court case
- Chicago Housing Authority Police Department
- Marshall Field Garden Apartments
