= ABLA Homes =

Public housing development in Chicago, Illinois, United States

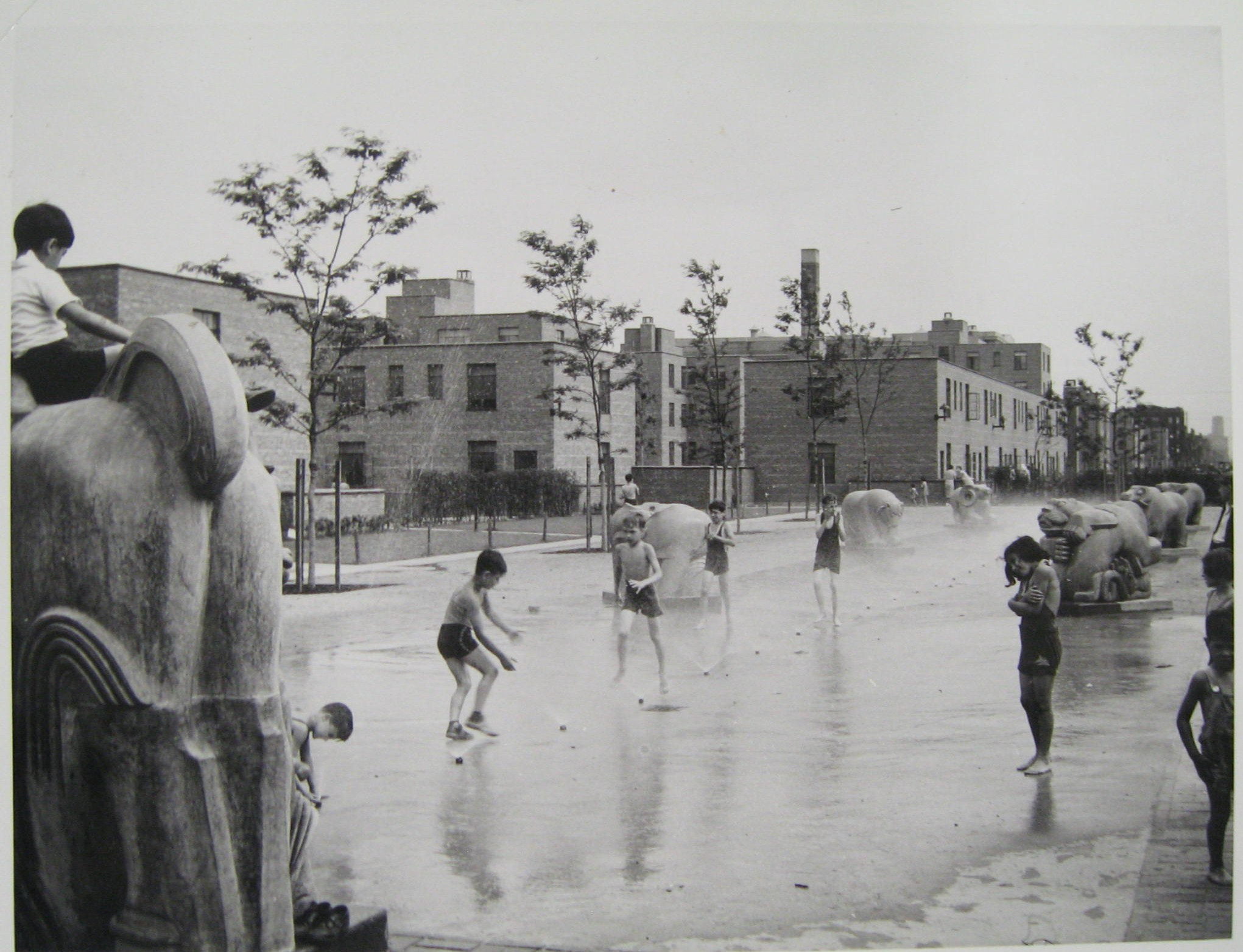
- Children playing at the fountain in the Jane Addams Homes
- Interactive map of ABLA Homes

General information
- Location: Bordered by Cabrini St. (North), Ashland Ave. (West), 15th St. (South), Blue Island Ave. (East); Chicago, Illinois, United States
- Coordinates: 41°51′58″N 87°39′35″W
- Status: 330 Units Remaining (Brooks Rowhouses; Renovated)

Construction
- Constructed: 1938–39; Addams Homes; 1942–43; Brooks Homes; 1960–62; Brooks Extensions; 1951; Loomis Courts; 1952–55; Abbott Homes

Listing
- Demolished: 2002–07 (Addams, Abbott, Loomis, and the Brooks Extensions)

Other information
- Governing body: Chicago Housing Authority

ABLA Homes (Jane Addams Homes, Robert Brooks Homes, Loomis Courts, and Grace Abbott Homes) was a Chicago Housing Authority (CHA) public housing development that comprised four separate public housing projects on the Near West Side of Chicago, Illinois. The name "ABLA" was an acronym for the names of the four different housing developments that together constituted one large site: Addams, Brooks (including the Robert Brooks Extension), Loomis, and Abbott, totaling 3,596 units. It spanned from Cabrini Street on the north end to 15th Street on the south end, and from Blue Island Avenue on the east end to Ashland Avenue on the west end. Most of the ABLA Homes have been demolished for the development of Roosevelt Square, a new mixed-income community by The Related Companies, with the renovated Brooks Homes being the only part left. For most of its existence, the ABLAs held more than 17,000 residents (though only 8,500 were officially on the lease), giving it the second largest population in the CHA. It was second only to the Robert Taylor Homes and Cabrini–Green in land area and had a higher occupancy than Cabrini–Green.

== History ==
=== Jane Addams and Grace Abbott Homes ===
The Jane Addams Homes (one of the first three public housing projects in Chicago) consisted of 32 buildings of 2, 3, and 4 stories (987 units) built in 1938 by Franklin D. Roosevelt's PWA Program. They housed hundreds of families over several decades until they were vacated in 2002. They were famous for their animal sculptures in the court area.

The buildings have largely been demolished. The one remaining building at 1322-24 West Taylor Street is being incorporated into plans for a new National Public Housing Museum, as part of the International Sites of Conscience. Originally made up of 7 15-story buildings and 33 2-story rowhouse buildings (1,198 units), the Grace Abbott Homes were built in 1955. In 2005, four of the high-rise buildings were demolished, and the rest were demolished by 2007. This property is planned to be redeveloped in Phases 3-6 of the new Roosevelt Square mixed-income community.

=== Robert Brooks Homes and Extensions/Loomis Courts ===
The Robert Brooks Homes were built in 1943 with 835 rowhouse units and was rebuilt in two phases between 1997 and 2000. The renovations reduced the housing density, resulting in 330 housing units. In 2005, the site was repurposed and became part of a new mixed-income development called Roosevelt Square.

The Robert Brooks extensions were built in 1961 and were made up of three 16-story buildings (450 units). One of the three buildings, Racine, was demolished in 1998. The remaining two buildings were demolished in 2001.

The Loomis Courts were built in 1951, and the 126-unit complex consisted of two seven-story buildings. Instead of coming from public housing funds, project funding came from city and state funds. In 2005, the CHA started a 2-phase rehabilitation process that preserved the property as affordable rental housing.

=== Cross Ashland ===
Just west of the ABLA's was a small neighborhood affectionately known as "'cross Ashland," named for the southern twang where many residents of the downtown and the projects pronounced its location. Bordered by Ashland Ave. to the east, Western Ave. on the west, the 15th Pl. train tracks to the south and Roosevelt Rd. on the north. This area originally went as far north as Polk, pre-dating the Medical district. Many black and Jewish people lived in the area through much of the 20th century until the late sixties when most Jews, Poles, and Italians moved away. Cross Ashland also extended east all the way to Halsted. Before the ABLA homes were constructed, many black people worked at the various rail yard companies at 15th St. until the companies all moved to foreign lands and the suburbs. They were proud to leave the oppressive south and work arduous hours to feed families and attend barbecues. In 2005, this community of roughly 10,000 in the fifties and 5,000 in the nineties was eventually brought to an end in a mass fire sale to land developers. Today the Cross Ashland area remains underdeveloped save for the new FBI building and University Police Station.

== Crime and violence ==
The housing projects were plagued by street gangs, drugs, and violent crimes. Most notably, the ABLA development was controlled by factions of the Black Gangster Disciples. In mid-1986, break-ins by entry through bathroom medicine cabinets began occurring in the Abbott buildings. The bathrooms in the apartments at the end of each floor were separated by only two feet of crawl space. Space was generally created for plumbers and janitors to have easy access to the pipes in the buildings.

=== Ruth Mae McCoy ===
On April 22, 1987, 52-year-old Ruth Mae McCoy was murdered by a person or persons who entered her 11th floor Abbott apartment (1440 W. 13th St.) through her bathroom cabinet sometime between 8:50 PM and 9:05 PM. McCoy called 9-1-1 at 8:45 that evening to report that someone in the apartment next door was coming through her bathroom cabinet. The 9-1-1 operator contacted the police, summarizing the situation as a "disturbance with a neighbor". The police did not arrive until after two more 9-1-1 calls came through between 8:50-9:04 PM about screaming and gunshots coming from McCoy's apartment. Police arrived around 9:10 PM, and after their knocks went unanswered, they attempted to enter the apartment using a key given to them by an attendant in the housing office, but left the premises when the key failed to work. The next evening, 9-1-1 received a call from McCoy's neighbor worried and concerned about her whereabouts, considering she had seen police at her door the night before and she still had not seen McCoy. Chicago Police and CHA security guards arrived back at McCoy's apartment. After the knocks and calls for McCoy went unanswered, officers suggested breaking the door down, but were cautioned not to by CHA security guards. The following evening, a CHA official arrived at McCoy's door with a carpenter who drilled the lock on the door. McCoy was found lying on her bedroom floor shot four times – in her left shoulder, left thigh, the right side of her abdomen, and right upper arm. Two men, Ted Turner, then aged 18, and John Hondras, 21, were charged with murder, home invasion, armed robbery, armed violence, and residential burglary. Witnesses claim that they saw the two men carrying McCoy's 19-inch color TV and rocking chair around the project in the early morning hours after her death. Due to lack of evidence, the charges against the two men were dropped after two years of the trial. The victim's daughter, Vernita McCoy, sued the Chicago Housing Authority for the cause of her mother's death in 1988. The murder may have partially inspired the idea for Candyman, the horror film.

== Existing conditions ==
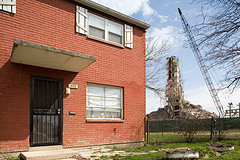
Photograph of one of the low-rise ABLA Homes (foreground) with the demolition of an ABLA high-rise (background), 2007.

ABLA once held over 17,000 residents but due to redevelopment, only 2,100 residents remain. Throughout the late 1990s and early 2000s, the Little Italy neighborhood (and inner city Chicago in general) underwent a significant period of gentrification resulting in almost all of the Chicago Housing Authority's projects being demolished or slated for redevelopment. The University Village redevelopment of the general Maxwell Street neighborhood and the expansion of the south campus of University of Illinois at Chicago also contributed to the end of ABLA.

== CHA Plan for Transformation ==
The CHA's redevelopment plan for ABLA is named Roosevelt Square and includes 1,467 public housing units, of which 329 units were completed in 2000 as part of a complete rehab of the Brooks Homes and 383 off-site CHA replacement units were newly constructed. Construction of the remaining 775 on-site mixed-income units at Roosevelt Square began in 2004. ABLA's new physical design includes traditional Chicago-style buildings including single family homes and six-flat structures. In June 2005, the Chicago Park District reopened Fosco Park, a 57,000-square-foot (5,300 m^{2}) community center which includes an indoor swimming pool, gymnasium, and a new daycare facility. A Jewel/Osco supermarket opened near ABLA in January 2002. The redevelopment plan also includes an integrated "campus" green space with Smyth School and Duncan YMCA. A new fire and police station was constructed near ABLA.

== In popular culture ==
The common nickname for the ABLA homes is "the village", or "the vill". Due to their proximity to downtown and the UIC Medical Center/University, the ABLAs can be seen in several films and television programs:

- The 80s police drama Hill Street Blues was set at a police station located two blocks east of ABLA. Stories from the show often involved situations there.
- In the 1987 film Next Of Kin many scenes were filmed in and around ABLA, most notably one in which Patrick Swayze hides from his pursuers inside the Robert Brooks Extension and bribes a young child to misdirect them.
- In the 2001 film Hardball, Keanu Reeves (who plays as Conor O'Neill) coaches a ragtag bunch of kids on an inner-city little league team. Almost half the film was shot at ABLA.
- Several episodes of ER, Chicago Hope and Early Edition have filmed scenes in and around the ABLA homes.
