= Helen Bernstein Book Award for Excellence in Journalism =

American literary award

The Helen Bernstein Book Award for Excellence in Journalism is an annual literary award for "a journalist whose work has brought public attention to important issues", awarded by the New York Public Library. It was established in 1987 in memory of journalist Helen Bernstein, and there is a cash award of $15,000.

== Winners ==
- 1988 – James Reston for fifty years of journalism
- 1989 – Judy Woodruff for television reporting of the Iran–Contra affair
- 1990 – Thomas Friedman for From Beirut to Jerusalem
- 1991 – Nicholas Lemann for The Promised Land: The Great Black Migration and How It Changed America
- 1992 – Alex Kotlowitz for There Are No Children Here: The Story of Two Boys Growing Up in the Other America
- 1993 – Samuel Freedman for Upon This Rock: The Miracles of a Black Church
- 1994 – David Remnick for Lenin's Tomb: The Last Days of the Soviet Empire
- 1995 – Joseph Nocera for A Piece of the Action: How the Middle Class Joined the Money Class
- 1996 – Tina Rosenberg for The Haunted Land: Facing Europe's Ghosts After Communism
- 1997 – David Quammen for The Song of the Dodo: Island Biogeography in an Age of Extinctions
- 1998 – Patti Waldmeir for Anatomy of A Miracle: The End of Apartheid and the Birth of the New South Africa
- 1999 – Philip Gourevitch for We Wish to Inform You That Tomorrow We Will Be Killed with Our Families: Stories from Rwanda
- 2000 Joint winner: – James Mann for About Face: A History of America's Curious Relationship with China, from Nixon to Clinton
- 2000 Joint winner: – Patrick Tyler for A Great Wall: Six Presidents and China: An Investigative History
- 2001 – Elaine Sciolino for Persian Mirrors: The Elusive Face of Iran
- 2002 – Nina Bernstein for The Lost Children of Wilder: The Epic Struggle to Change Foster Care
- 2003 – Keith Bradsher for High and Mighty: SUVs--The World’s Most Dangerous Vehicles and How They Got That Way
- 2004 – Dana Priest for The Mission: Waging War and Keeping Peace with America’s Military (W. W. Norton & Company)
- 2005 – Jason DeParle for American Dream: Three Women, Ten Kids, and a Nation's Drive to End Welfare (Viking)
- 2006 – George Packer for The Assassins' Gate: America in Iraq (Farrar, Straus and Giroux)
- 2007 – Lawrence Wright for The Looming Tower: Al-Qaeda and the Road to 9/11 (Alfred A. Knopf)
- 2008 – Charlie Savage for Takeover: The Return of the Imperial Presidency and the Subversion of American Democracy (Little Brown & Company)
- 2009 – Jane Mayer for The Dark Side: The Inside Story of How the War on Terror Turned into a War on American Ideals (Doubleday)
- 2010 – David Finkel for The Good Soldiers (Sarah Crichton Books/Farrar Straus and Giroux)
- 2011 – Shane Harris for The Watchers: The Rise of America's Surveillance State
- 2012 – Ellen Schultz for Retirement Heist: How Companies Plunder and Profit from the Nest Eggs of American Workers
- 2013 – Katherine Boo for Behind the Beautiful Forevers: Life, Death, and Hope in a Mumbai Undercity
- 2014 – Dan Fagin for Toms River: A Story of Science and Salvation
- 2015 – Anand Giridharadas for The True American: Murder and Mercy in Texas
- 2016 – Jill Leovy for Ghettoside: A True Story of Murder in America
- 2017 – Jane Mayer for Dark Money: The Hidden History of the Billionaires Behind the Rise of the Radical Right
- 2018 – Masha Gessen for The Future is History: How Totalitarianism Reclaimed Russia
- 2019 – Shane Bauer for American Prison: A Reporter's Undercover Journey into the Business of Punishment
  - No Turning Back: Life, Loss, and Hope in Wartime Syria by Rania Abouzeid
  - The Poisoned City: Flint's Water and the American Urban Tragedy by Anna Clark
  - Amity and Prosperity: One Family and the Fracturing of America by Eliza Griswold
  - Dopesick: Dealers, Doctors, and the Drug Company That Addicted America by Beth Macy
- 2020 – Rachel Louise Snyder for No Visible Bruises: What We Don’t Know About Domestic Violence Can Kill Us
  - She Said: Breaking the Sexual Harassment Story That Helped Ignite a Movement by Jodi Kantor and Megan Twohey
  - Charged: The New Movement to Transform American Prosecution and End Mass Incarceration by Emily Bazelon
  - A Good Provider Is One Who Leaves: One Family and Migration in the 21st Century by Jason DeParle
  - The Outlaw Ocean: Journey’s Across the Last Untamed Frontier by Ian Urbina
- 2022 – Andrea Elliott for Invisible Child: Poverty, Survival & Hope in an American City
  - The End of Bias: A Beginning: The Science and Practice of Overcoming Unconscious Bias by Jessica Nordell
  - The Inevitable: Dispatches on the Right to Die by Katie Engelhart
  - Made in China: A Prisoner, an SOS Letter, and the Hidden Cost of America’s Cheap Goods by Amelia Pang
  - Planet Palm: How Palm Oil Ended Up in Everything and Endangered the World by Jocelyn C. Zuckerman
- 2023 – Ben Rawlence for The Treeline: The Last Forest and the Future of Life on Earth
  - The Chaos Machine: The Inside Story of How Social Media Rewired Our Minds and Our World by Max Fisher
  - My Fourth Time We Drowned: Seeking Refuge on the World's Deadliest Migration Route by Sally Hayden
  - The Other Side of Prospect: A Story of Violence, Injustice, and the American City by Nicholas Dawidoff
  - Under the Skin: The Hidden Toll of Racism on American Lives and on the Health of our Nation by Linda Villarosa
- 2024 – Patricia Evangelista for Some People Need Killing: A Memoir of Murder in My Country
  - Crossings: How Road Ecology is Shaping the Future of our Planet by Ben Goldfarb
  - How to Make a Killing: Blood, Death, and Dollars in American Medicine by Tom Mueller
  - The Heat Will Kill You First: Life and Death on a Scorched Planet by Jeff Goodell
  - We Were Once a Family: A Story of Love, Death, and Child Removal in America by Roxanna Asgarian
- 2025 – Mix Hixenbaugh for They Came for the Schools: One Town's Fight Over Race and Identity, and the New War for America's Classrooms
  - Gaslight: The Atlantic Coast Pipeline and the Fight for America's Energy Future by Jonathan Mingle
  - On the Move: The Overheating Earth and the Uprooting of America by Abrahm Lustgarten
  - Power Metal: The Race for the Resources That Will Shape the Future by Vince Beiser
  - Systemic: How Racism is Making Us Sick by Layal Liverpool
- 2026 – Karen Hao for Empire of AI: Dreams and Nightmares in Sam Altman’s OpenAI
  - Bad Company: Private Equity and the Death of the American Dream by Megan Greenwell
  - There Is No Place for Us: Working and Homeless in America by Brian Goldstone
  - Unbearable: Five Women and the Perils of Pregnancy in America by Irin Carmon
  - We Are Eating the Earth: The Race to Fix Our Food System and Save Our Climate by Michael Grunwald
