= Atlas of AI =

2021 nonfiction book

- First edition
- Author: Kate Crawford
- Language: English
- Genre: Philosophy of artificial intelligence
- Publisher: Yale University Press
- Publication date: May 25, 2021
- Media type: Paperback, hardback
- Pages: 336 pp
- ISBN: 9780300209570

Atlas of AI: Power, Politics, and the Planetary Costs of Artificial Intelligence is a book by Australian academic Kate Crawford. It is based on Crawford's research into the development and labor behind artificial intelligence, as well as AI's impact on the world.

== Overview ==
The book is mainly concerned with the ethics of artificial intelligence. Chapters 1 and 2 criticise Big Tech in general for exploitation of Earth's resources, such as in the Thacker Pass Lithium Mine, and human labor, such as in Amazon warehouses and the Amazon Mechanical Turk. Crawford also compares "TrueTime" in Google's Spanner with historical efforts to control time associated with colonialism. In Chapters 3 and 4, attention is drawn to the practice of building datasets without consent, and of training on incorrect or biased data, with particular focus on ImageNet and on a failed Amazon project to classify job applicants. Chapter 5 criticises affective computing for employing training sets which, although natural, were labelled by people who had been grounded in controversial emotional expression research by Paul Ekman, in particular his Facial Action Coding System (FACS), which had been based on posed images; it is implied that Affectiva's approach would not sufficiently attenuate the problems of FACS, and attention is drawn to potential inaccurate use of this technology in job interviews without addressing claims that human bias is worse. In Chapter 6, Crawford gives an overview of the secret services' surveillance software as revealed in the leaks of Edward Snowden, with a brief comparison to Cambridge Analytica and the military use of metadata, and recounts Google employees' objections to their unwitting involvement in Project Maven (giving their image recognition a military use) before this was moved to Palantir. Chapter 7 criticises the common perception of AlphaGo as an otherworldly intelligence instead of a natural product of massive brute-force calculation at environmental cost, and Chapter 8 discusses tech billionaires' fantasies of developing private spaceflight to escape resource depletion on Earth.

== Reception ==
The book received positive reviews from critics, who singled out its exploration of issues like exploitation of labour and the environment, algorithmic bias, and false claims about AI's ability to recognize human emotion.

The book was considered a seminal work by Anais Resseguier of Ethics and AI. It was included on the year end booklists of Financial Times, and New Scientist, and the 2021 Choice Outstanding Academic Titles booklist.

Data scientist and MIT Technology Review editor Karen Hao praised the book's description of the ethical concerns regarding the labor and history behind artificial intelligence.

Sue Halpern of The New York Review commented that she felt the book shined a light on "dehumanizing extractive practices", a sentiment which was echoed by Michael Spezio of Science. Virginia Dignum of Nature positively compared the book's exploration of artificial intelligence to The Alignment Problem by Brian Christian.

== See also ==
- Empire of AI
