= Henry Horner Homes =

Public housing development in Chicago, Illinois, United States

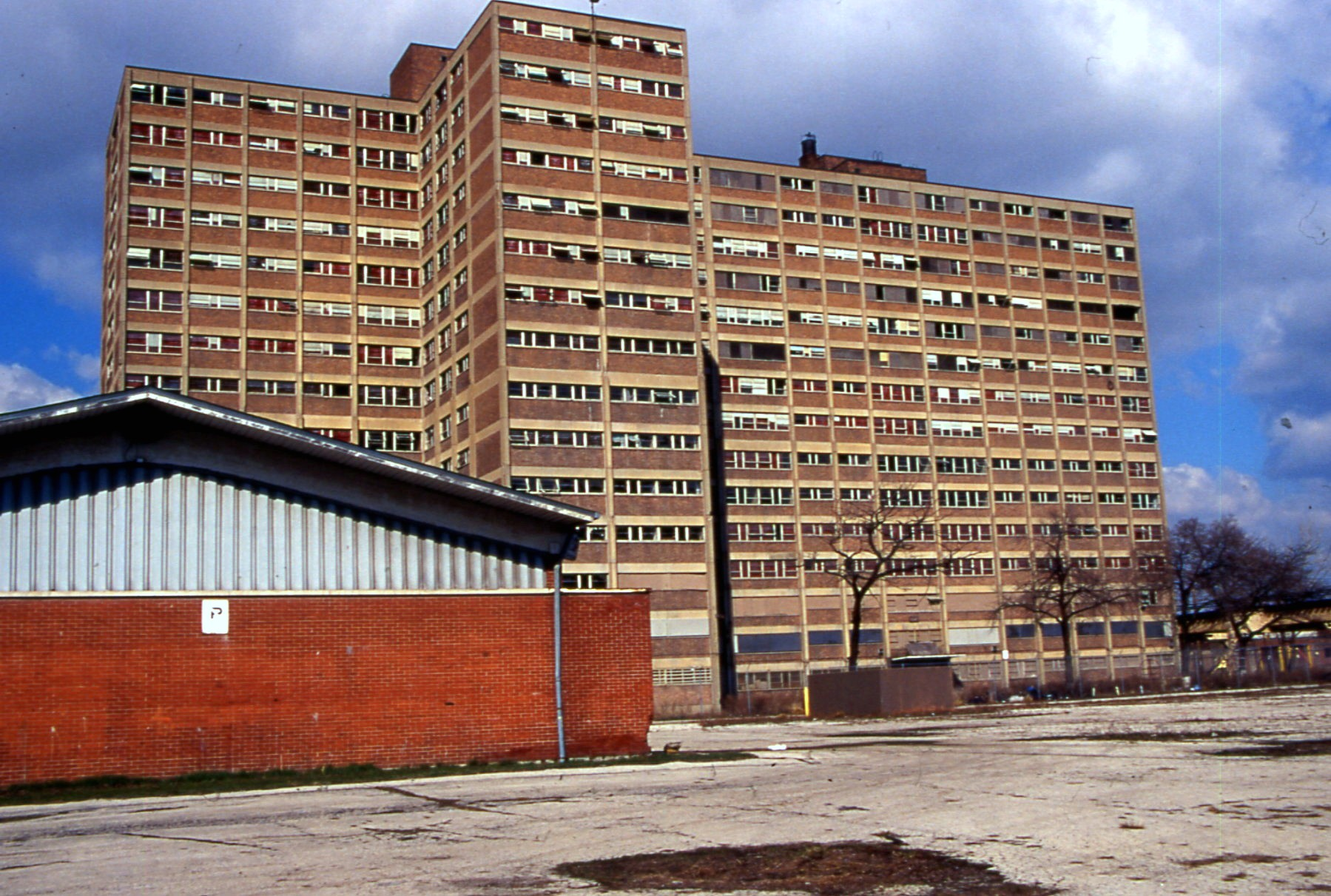
- 2002 photograph of a vacant remaining building in the housing project.
- Interactive map of Henry Horner Homes

General information
- Location: Near West Side, Chicago, Illinois
- Coordinates: 41°53′3″N 87°40′36″W
- Status: Demolished

Construction
- Constructed: 1957–1959; 1961–1963 (extension)

Listing
- Demolished: 1995–2008

Other information
- Governing body: Chicago Housing Authority (CHA)

Henry Horner Homes was a Chicago Housing Authority (CHA) public housing project located in the Near West Side community area on the West Side of Chicago, Illinois, United States. The original section of Henry Horner Homes was bordered by Oakley Boulevard to the west, Washington Boulevard to the south, Hermitage Avenue to the east, and Lake Street to the north near the United Center. A discontiguous section named Horner Annex was bordered by Honore Street to the west, Adams Street to the south, Wood Street to the east, and Monroe Street to the north. Constructed between 1957 and 1963, The housing project was named in honor of former Illinois governor Henry Horner.

== History ==
Henry Horner Homes originally consisted of 16 high-rise buildings along with low–rise buildings (920 units) and was completed in 1957. The Henry Horner Homes extension was added in 1961, which included 737 multi–story units. The original buildings consisted of two 15–story buildings and eight 7–story buildings, while the extension consisted of four 14–story buildings and two 8–story buildings all together totaling 1,656 units.

In 1983, Maurine Woodson, a resident of the housing project founded The Henry Horner Mother's Guild. The Mother's Guild was a community group to help mothers cope with life within the housing project. At its peak the group consisted of thirty mothers. The group received funds totaling $88,000 from charitable foundations throughout the city from 1986 to 1988. The funds were used for community schemes such as clean-up efforts within the housing project and programs for youth in the neighborhood.

=== Crime and gang violence ===
Gang activity plagued the housing project for decades, beginning in the mid–1970s. The gangs, such as the Blackstone Rangers (which became known later as El Rukn), asserted authority over the area and residents often engaged in gang warfare and criminal activity. By the mid–1980s, several gangs dominated the housing project; Gangster Disciples, Four Corner Hustlers, Traveling Vice Lords and Gangster Stones. In October 1969, 20–year old resident Michael Soto was shot to death by a Chicago police officer after being targeted, due to his protesting for a traffic light. Soto and a friend were chased by police after being falsely accused of robbing a man near the project, which led to a "shootout" between Soto and the officers. In the incident, ten police officers and a little girl were injured. In May 1975, Chicago police patrolman Joseph Cali was shot to death at the project by sniper fire while writing a ticket for an illegally parked vehicle; three men were charged with his death. Aside from gangs, the housing projects experienced issues with sexual assaults in high numbers; most notably the June 1985 rape and murder of a child resident. On June 10, 1985, five–year old Shavanna McCann was raped and killed by a 17–year old juvenile who visited the project. The assailant, Johnny Freeman, lured McCann to a vacant apartment on the 13th floor of the 2111 W. Lake Street building. Freeman raped her and threw her from a window to her death.

=== 1991 lawsuit and demolition ===
In May 1991, residents of the housing project and members of the Henry Horner Mother's Guild filed a class-action lawsuit against the Chicago Housing Authority for neglect. They argued that the CHA had let the buildings deteriorate, with rodent infestations, numerous plumbing, lighting, and other city code violations. The group created a video produced by the Chicago Video Project showing the living conditions at the housing project. Demolition began at the housing project in August 1995 by the Department of Housing and Urban Development (HUD) after taking control of the CHA high-rises six years prior. The last high–rise building was demolished in June 2005. The last building in the original projects, a mid–rise, was demolished in 2008.

== Redevelopment ==
A redevelopment project, referred to as the Plan for Transformation, is currently in progress to rehabilitate the existing buildings and create new mixed-income housing. The new neighborhood will be called "West Haven". The first phase of the project, which involved the building of 461 replacement housing units, was completed in 2001. The second phase will be worked on in three stages: public housing, affordable housing, and market rate housing.

== Pop culture ==
The housing project was the setting for the documentary film Legacy as well as the non–fiction book There Are No Children Here: The Story of Two Boys Growing Up in the Other America by Alex Kotlowitz. The book later became a television movie starring Oprah Winfrey in 1993, in which filming took place at the housing project. The housing project was also featured in the 1995 film Losing Isaiah, starring Halle Berry.

== See also ==
- Subsidized housing
- Housing subsidies
