= Michael Langan =

Michael Langan may refer to:

- Michael Langan (director), American film director
- Michael Langan (Gaelic footballer), Irish Gaelic footballer
