= Wholphin (DVD magazine) =

US magazine

- Editor: Brent Hoff
- Frequency: Quarterly
- First issue: December 2005
- Final issue: February 2012
- Company: McSweeney's
- Country: US
- Based in: San Francisco
- Website: Wholphin

Wholphin was a quarterly DVD magazine running 15 issues containing a selection of short films which had little or no exposure elsewhere. The magazine was created by Dave Eggers and Brent Hoff of McSweeney's publishing house. It was named after the marine animal of the same name, a rare hybrid of a false killer whale and a dolphin, which highlights its unusual nature.

Eggers and Hoff claim they were inspired to create it after the Cannes Film Festival, which is one of very few places at which many of these short films can ever be seen. Short films and documentaries have limited exposure to the general public because, in the words of Hoff, "they're too short to show on TV, and they don't play in theaters because they'd rather show some great trivia about Adam Sandler."

The first issue of Wholphin was released in December 2005, containing among others a documentary by Spike Jonze about Al Gore, by David O. Russell on U.S. soldiers in Iraq, films by Miguel Arteta and Miranda July, David Byrne and Selma Blair, Turkish sitcoms and Iranian animation. Issue 15, the last Wholphin, was published February 2012.

Issues 2, 3, and 4 each came with a bonus DVD of the three parts of the documentary The Power of Nightmares by Adam Curtis. The magazine did not include any advertisement.

== Issues ==
Issue 1 (2007)

- Al Gore Documentary by Spike Jonze
- Soldier's Pay (documentary) by David O. Russell
- Death of a Hen (animated) by Brian Dewan
- Are You the Favorite Person of Anybody? by Miranda July
- The Writer (animated) by Carson Mell
- The Big Empty by J. Lisa Chang & Newton Thomas Seigel
- The House in the Middle by National Clean Up, Paint Up, Fix Up Bureau
- The Delicious by Scott Pendergast
- Malek Khorshid by Ali Akbar Sadeghi
- Tatli Hayat ("The Sweet Life" aka "The Turkish Jeffersons"), sitcom, English subtitles provided by Jack Pendarvis, Rodney Rothman, Brian Reich, and A.G. Pasquella
- Stairway at St. Paul by Jeroen Offerman
- The Great Escape by Jeroen Offerman

Issue 2 (2007)

- The Movie Movie (An Excerpt) (Documentary, featuring Donald Trump) by Errol Morris
- Building No. 7 by Steven Soderbergh
- The Pity Card (unaired TV pilot featuring Zach Galifianakis) by Bob Odenkirk
- American Storage (Comedic Short with Martin Starr) by Andrew Jay Cohen
- Home, James, and Don't Spare the Horses by John Dolan
- More (Animated short) by Mark Osborne
- Sour Death Balls by Jessica Yu
- The Mysterious Geographic Explorations of Jasper Morello (Animated short) by Anthony Lucas
- The Mesmerist (recovered film featuring Boris Karloff) by Bill Morrison
- Oksuma Wa Majo (Bewitched), Japanese sitcom, resubtitled by Daniel Handler, Dan Kennedy, Rich Blomquist, Scott Jacobson, and Jason Reich
- How to Poke Pole a Monkey-Faced Eel (Instructional Video)

Issue 3 (2007)

- The Russian Suicide Chair (Explosive Performance Art) by Dennis Hopper
- The Passion of Martin by Alexander Payne
- A Stranger in Her Own City (Documentary) by Khadija Al-Salami
- A Bee and a Cigarette by Bob Odenkirk
- Funky Forest The First Contact by Naisu No Mori
- Never Like the First Time by Jonas Odell
- Kitchen by Alice Winocour
- Ballistic Jaw Propulsion of Trap-Jaw Ants (Scientific discovery)
- "Yeah Yeah, We Speak English. Just Serve." by Wholphin
- Flotsam/Jetsam by David Zellner & Nathan Zellner
- Tactical Advantage by Daren Rabinovitch
- Bobby Bird by Carson Mell

Issue 4 (2007)

- Two Cars, One Night by Taika Waititi
- High Falls by Andrew Zuckerman, screenplay by Alex Vlack
- Strange Culture by Lynn Hershman Leeson
- Heavy Metal Jr. by Chris Waitt
- Schastlivy Vmeste (Happy Together) (re-scripted Russian sitcom)
- Heavy Metal Drummer by Toby MacDonald and Luke Morris
- La Chatte Andalouse by Gérald Hustache-Mathieu
- Tom's War on Terror by Cameron Fay
- Cheeta (Original Wholphin short)
- Site Specific_Las Vegas 05 by Olivo Barbieri
- Bonus Disc: The Power of Nightmares Part III: The Shadows in the Cave by Adam Curtis

Issue 5 (2008)

- Death to the Tinman by Ray Tintori
- Drunk Bees by Wholphin
- House Hunting by Amy Lippman
- American Outrage by George Gage
- Madame Tutli-Putli by Chris Lavis and Maciek Szczerbowski
- Piece by Piece by West Side Filmworks
- Chonto by Carson Mell
- Echos Der Buchrücken (Parts I & III) by Cesar Velasco Broca
- One Day with the SLA by David Martinez and Shane Bauer
- Monument Valley Flight Attempt by Will Lamson
- John "Kung Fu" Wang by Dan Vest
- Shot Through by Tom Dale

Issue 6 (2008)

- Please Vote for Me by Weijun Chen
- Force 1 TD by Randy Krallman
- Silence is Golden by Chris Shepherd
- Safari & Safari Menus by Catherine Chalmers
- New Boy by Steph Green
- Darling Darling by Matthew Lessner
- Bigfoot: A Beast on the Run by David Thayer
- On the Assassination of the President by Adam Keker
- The Man in the Grey Suit by Roger Teich
- Lucky by Nash Edgerton

Issue 7 (2008)

- Refugee All Stars by Banker White and Zach Niles
- Cold & Dry by Kristoffer Joner
- The Discipline of DE by Gus Van Sant
- Nutkin's Last Stand by Nicholas Berger
- Field Notes from Dimension X by Carson Mell
- Choque by Nacho Vigalondo
- David Huggins: Experienced by Jeremy Vaeni
- The Even More Fun Trip by Bob Sabiston
- Glory at Sea by Benjamin Zeitlin
- Look at the Sun by Wholphin
- William Tell by William Lamson
- Fantaisie in Bubblewrap by Arthur Metcalf
- Bonus Disc: Select Your Intention by Aaron Michels

Issue 8 (2009)

- Short Term 12 by Destin Daniel Cretton
- Kids + Money by Lauren Greenfield
- My Friends Told Me About You by Carlos Dengler in collaboration with Daniel Ryan
- From Burger It Came by Dominic Bisignano
- Love You More by Sam Taylor-Wood, written by Patrick Marber
- Hidden by Hanna Heilborn, David Aronowitsch and Mats Johansson
- Great Man and Cinema by Jim Finn
- The Room Before and After (Original Wholphin short)
  - Part 1: by James Franco
  - Part 2: by Creed Bratton
  - Part 3: by Maria Bamford

Issue 9 (2009)

- Sparks by Joseph Gordon-Levitt
- La Corona produced and directed by Amanda Micheli and Isabel Vega
- The Creature Within & Melbourne Years by Spike Jonze
- Maurice at the World's Fair by Spike Jonze and Lance Bangs
- Acting for the Camera directed by Justin Nowell, written by Thomas Nowell
- Skhizein by Jérémy Clapin
- Jerrycan by Julius Avery
- The Unmaking of 'I Am a Sex Addict' by Caveh Zahedi
- Sister Wife by Jill Orschel
- Mompelaar by Wim Reygaert and Marc Roels
- Sunday, 6 April, 11:42am by Flatform
- Bearings Glocken by Kawase Kohske
- Motodrom by Jörg Wagner

Issue 10 (2009)

- Audience of One by Michael Jacobs
- I Love Sarah Jane by Spencer Susser
- He Was Once by Mary Hestand
- Teleglobal Dreamin' by Eric Flanagan
- The Astronomer's Dream by Malcolm Sutherland
- Eve by Natalie Portman
- Joe and Linda Flooded Out of Holy Cross by Jonathan Demme
- Ptchogastria. Spatulate by Brent Hoff
- Automatic Kite Drawings by William Lamson
- Alive Right Now, Somewhere (Original Wholphin short)
- Hunt and Gather by William Lamson

Issue 11 (2010)

- The Six Dollar Fifty Man by Mark Albiston and Louis Sutherland
- Bitch Academy by Alina Rudnitskaya
- Plastic Bag by Ramin Bahrani
- Can We Talk? by Jim Owen
- Wagah by Supriyo Sen
- Dock Ellis & The LSD No-No by James Blagden
- Wolf Ticket by Dugan Beach
- Out of Our Minds by Tony Stone
- Young Love by Ariel Kleiman
- Southern Exposure by Christopher Sheehy
- TJ Miller Auditions for Yogi Bear by Jordan Vogt-Roberts

Issue 12 (2010)

- Static No. 12 by Daniel Crooks
- Ride No. 2 by Daniel Crooks
- Pan No. 2 by Daniel Crooks
- Rob and Valentyna in Scotland by Eric Lynne
- Mi Amigo Invisible by Pablo Larcuen
- Woman in Burka by Jonathan Lisecki
- Miracle Fish by Luke Doolan
- I Don't Blame the Beautiful Game by Christopher Arcella
- Drunk History Vol. 3, created by Derek Waters, directed by Jeremy Konner
- Dynamic Tom: Portrait of a Cocksman by Andrew Cohn
- Here Comes Greatness by Matthew Lue & Greg Fiering
- The Armoire by Jamie Travis

Issue 13 (2011)

- Successful Alcoholics by Jordan Vogt-Roberts
- 'N Me For Myself by Giorgis Grigorakis
- Arsy-Versy by Miro Remo
- Crossbow by David Michôd
- The History of Aviation by Bálint Kenyeres
- Mosquito by Jeremy Engle
- The Unclothed Man in the 35th Century A.D. by Dash Shaw
- Delemeier Builds a Machine by Landon Zakheim
- We Are the Faithful by Michael Koch
- How to Explain It to My Parents (Arno Coenen) by Lernert & Sander

Issue 14 (2011)

- Quadrangle by Amy Grappell
- Please Say Something by David OReilly
- Pioneer by David Lowery
- I Am a Girl! by Susan Koenen
- Soft by Simon Ellis
- Feeder by Joseph Ernst
- Chicken Heads (Roos Djaj) by Bassam Jarbawi
- The Eagleman Stag by Mikey Please
- Inside Report from Fukushima Nuclear Reactor Evacuation Zone by Tetsuo Jimbo
- Styrofoam by Noah Sheldon
- Sasquatch Birth Journal 2 by David & Nathan Zellner

Issue 15 (2012)

- Gayby by Jonathan Lisecki
- Tord and Tord by Niki Lindroth von Bahr
- Buy It Now by Antonio Campos
- Mary Last Seen by Sean Durkin
- Animal Love by Mollie Jones
- How to Rid Your Lover of a Negative Emotion Caused by You! by Nadia Litz
- Kevin by Jay Duplass
- The Love Competition by Brent Hoff
- Heliotropes (Adaptation of poem by Brian Christian) by Michael Langan
- Shrine of Santa Muerte by Carter Gunn and Ross McDonnell
- B-Flat by Adam Frelin

== Best-of issues ==
Volume 1 (2008)

- Two Cars, One Night directed by Taika Waititi
- Heavy Metal Jr. directed by Chris Waitt
- The Pity Card directed by Bob Oedenkirk
- Chonto directed by Carson Mell
- American Outrage (excerpt) directed by George and Beth Gage
- Wallyball: "Yeah, Yeah, We Speak English. Just Serve." by Wholphin
- The Delicious directed by Scott Prendergast
- More directed by Mark Osborne
- A Stranger in Her Own City directed by Khadija Al-Salami
- Are You the Favorite Person of Anybody? directed by Miguel Arteta
- Untitled Patton/Byrne Piece by Wholphin
- Baby Squid, Born Like Stars by Wholphin
- Tactical Advantage directed by Daren Rabinovitch
