= The Alignment Problem =

2020 non-fiction book by Brian Christian

The Alignment Problem: Machine Learning and Human Values
- Hardcover edition
- Author: Brian Christian
- Language: English
- Subject: AI alignment
- Publisher: W. W. Norton & Company
- Publication date: October 6, 2020
- Publication place: United States
- Media type: Print, e-book, audiobook
- Pages: 496
- ISBN: 0393635821
- OCLC: 1137850003
- Website: brianchristian.org/the-alignment-problem/

The Alignment Problem: Machine Learning and Human Values is a 2020 non-fiction book by the American writer Brian Christian. It is based on numerous interviews with experts trying to build artificial intelligence systems, particularly machine learning systems, that are aligned with human values.

== Summary ==
The book is divided into three sections: Prophecy, Agency, and Normativity. Each section covers researchers and engineers working on different challenges in the alignment of artificial intelligence with human values.

=== Prophecy ===
In the first section, Christian interweaves discussions of the history of artificial intelligence research, particularly the machine learning approach of artificial neural networks such as the Perceptron and AlexNet, with examples of how AI systems can have unintended behavior. He tells the story of Julia Angwin, a journalist whose ProPublica investigation of the COMPAS algorithm, a tool for predicting recidivism among criminal defendants, led to widespread criticism of its accuracy and bias towards certain demographics. One of AI's main alignment challenges is its black box nature (inputs and outputs are identifiable but the transformation process in between is undetermined). The lack of transparency makes it difficult to know where the system is going right and where it is going wrong.

=== Agency ===
In the second section, Christian similarly interweaves the history of the psychological study of reward, such as behaviorism and dopamine, with the computer science of reinforcement learning, in which AI systems need to develop policy ("what to do") in the face of a value function ("what rewards or punishment to expect"). He calls the DeepMind AlphaGo and AlphaZero systems "perhaps the single most impressive achievement in automated curriculum design." He also highlights the importance of curiosity, in which reinforcement learners are intrinsically motivated to explore their environment, rather than exclusively seeking the external reward.

=== Normativity ===
The third section covers training AI through the imitation of human or machine behavior, as well as philosophical debates such as between possibilism and actualism that imply different ideal behavior for AI systems. Of particular importance is inverse reinforcement learning, a broad approach for machines to learn the objective function of a human or another agent. Christian discusses the normative challenges associated with effective altruism and existential risk, including the work of philosophers Toby Ord and William MacAskill who are trying to devise human and machine strategies for navigating the alignment problem as effectively as possible.

== Reception ==
The book received positive reviews from critics. The Wall Street Journal's David A. Shaywitz emphasized the frequent problems when applying algorithms to real-world problems, describing the book as "a nuanced and captivating exploration of this white-hot topic." Publishers Weekly praised the book for its writing and extensive research.

Kirkus Reviews gave the book a positive review, calling it "technically rich but accessible", and "an intriguing exploration of AI." Writing for Nature, Virginia Dignum gave the book a positive review, favorably comparing it to Kate Crawford's Atlas of AI.

In 2021, journalist Ezra Klein had Christian on his podcast, The Ezra Klein Show, writing in The New York Times, "The Alignment Problem is the best book on the key technical and moral questions of A.I. that I’ve read." Later that year, the book was listed in a Fast Company feature, "5 books that inspired Microsoft CEO Satya Nadella this year".

In 2022, the book won the Eric and Wendy Schmidt Award for Excellence in Science Communication, given by The National Academies of Sciences, Engineering, and Medicine in partnership with Schmidt Futures.

In 2024, The New York Times placed The Alignment Problem first in its list of the "5 Best Books About Artificial Intelligence," saying: "If you're going to read one book on artificial intelligence, this is the one."

== See also ==
- Effective altruism
- Global catastrophic risk
- Human Compatible: Artificial Intelligence and the Problem of Control
- Superintelligence: Paths, Dangers, Strategies
