= Murder of Derrion Albert =

2009 murder in Chicago, Illinois

- Location: Near Christian Fenger Academy High School; South Side (Chicago)
- Date: September 24, 2009
- Attack type: Battery; Homicide
- Victims: Derrion Albert, 16

Derrion Albert, a 16-year-old boy, was brutally beaten to death on September 24, 2009, near Christian Fenger Academy High School on Chicago's South Side, after walking near a violent confrontation where he was dragged into the fight and murdered. The murder was caught on camera and went viral, bringing attention to Chicago’s youth violence problem.

== Events of September 24 ==
Reports and video footage indicate that Albert was caught in a brawl between two factions of students at Christian Fenger Academy High school, from two neighborhoods, Altgeld Gardens and The Ville. His death occurred after he was brutally beaten by several boys with pieces of a railroad tie. Police initially arrested four individuals, Silvonus Shannon, Eric Carson, Eugene Riley, and Eugene Bailey, who were charged with first-degree murder. Charges were later dropped against Bailey after further investigations.

By 2011, five individuals had been convicted of Albert's death: Shannon, Carson, Riley, Lapoleon Colbert, and a minor whose name was not publicized. The older defendants received prison terms ranging from 26 to 32 years.

== Public response ==
The amateur video footage of the beating, obtained by Chicago television station WFLD, was widely broadcast in both traditional and online media. Largely resulting from the widespread circulation of this video, the story attracted much national attention within the United States, leading President Barack Obama to send U.S. Attorney General Eric Holder and Secretary of Education Arne Duncan to Chicago to discuss youth violence with Mayor Richard M. Daley. Secretary Duncan was also interviewed by Anderson Cooper on the cable news channel CNN regarding violence in Chicago.

The murder and its subsequent coverage form an important part of the 2011 Steve James documentary The Interrupters, which profiles the work of the antiviolence organization CeaseFire. Rapper Nas also wrote an open letter to the Chicago youth. The letter can be found on Rap Genius. The murder also inspired a 2014 short film--written, directed and executive produced by first-time film director Derrick Sanders--called Perfect Day. The film starred a young Daniel Kyri (Chicago Fire TV series) as a Derrion composite called Desmond, and was co-produced by Jessica Estelle Huggins, and co-executive produced by Chadwick Boseman. The film was dedicated to Derrion's memory.

== See also ==
- List of homicides in Illinois
- List of murdered American children
