= Tania Lombrozo =

American psychologist

- Education: Stanford University; Harvard University
- Scientific career
- Workplaces: University of California, Berkeley; Princeton University
- Thesis: Understanding explanation : studies in teleology, simplicity, and causal knowledge (2006)
- Doctoral advisor: Susan Carey

Tania Lombrozo is an American psychologist who is the Arthur W. Marks Professor of Psychology at Princeton University. She oversees the Concepts and Cognition Laboratory, which looks to understand the science that underpins cognition.

== Early life and education ==
Lombrozo is from the United States. She was an undergraduate student at Stanford University, where she earned an undergraduate degree in Symbolic Systems and Philosophy. During her undergraduate research, she worked with Peter Godfrey-Smith on the philosophy of science. She moved to Harvard University as a graduate student in psychology and stayed for a doctorate in psychology under the supervision of Susan Carey. Her thesis explored explanation and causal knowledge.

== Research and career ==
In 2006 Lombrozo joined the University of California, Berkeley, as an assistant professor. She was made the Class of 1944 Chair in the Department of Psychology in 2017.

Lombrozo was made the Arthur W. Marks Professor of Psychology at Princeton University in 2019. Her research looks to understand cognition. She is particularly interested in explanation and understanding, as well as folk epistemology.

She was a frequent contributor to NPR, where she wrote on psychology and cognitive science. She was also a contributor to Psychology Today. She has worked with the Association for Psychological Science to better engage the public in psychological research.

== Awards and honors ==
- 2010 Society for Philosophy and Psychology Stanton Prize
- 2011 James S. McDonnell Foundation Scholar Award in Understanding Human Cognition
- 2012 American Psychological Association Janet Taylor Spence Award
- 2014 Society of Experimental Psychologists Early Investigator Award
- 2016 American Psychological Association Distinguished Scientific Award for an Early Career Contribution to Psychology
- 2018 National Science Foundation CAREER Award
- 2020 American Psychological Foundation Joseph B. Gittler Award

== Selected publications ==
- Tania Lombrozo (2006). "The structure and function of explanations". Trends in Cognitive Sciences. 10 (10): 464–470. doi:10.1016/j.tics.2006.08.004. PMID 16942895. Wikidata Q36581851.
- Tania Lombrozo (2006). "Simplicity and probability in causal explanation". Cognitive Psychology. 55 (3): 232–257. doi:10.1016/j.cogpsych.2006.09.006. PMID 17097080. Wikidata Q44600638.
- Tania Lombrozo; Susan Carey (2005). "Functional explanation and the function of explanation". Cognition. 99 (2): 167–204. doi:10.1016/j.cognition.2004.12.009. PMID 15939416. Wikidata Q30350833.

== Personal life ==
Lombrozo is married to fellow Princeton psychology professor Tom Griffiths and has two daughters.
