= Empire of AI =

2025 book documenting OpenAI's origins

Empire of AI: Dreams and Nightmares in Sam Altman's OpenAI
- Author: Karen Hao
- Cover artist: Daniel Lagin
- Language: English
- Genre: Biography
- Publisher: Penguin Press (U.S.)
- Publication date: May 20, 2025
- Publication place: United States
- Media type: E-book, print (hardback), and audiobook
- Pages: 496 pp.
- ISBN: 978-0593657508

Empire of AI: Dreams and Nightmares in Sam Altman's OpenAI, is a 2025 non-fiction book by Karen Hao. The title makes reference to colonial empires of the 1800s. The book was positively reviewed and received two awards.

== Background ==
Hao visited OpenAI's offices and covered the company for the MIT Technology Review two years before ChatGPT was released in November 2022. The experience she had while visiting the company and reporting on "AI colonialism" for about seven years helped her while developing the book. The book includes interviews with a total of 300 people, correspondence, Slack conversations, and relevant documents. OpenAI declined to cooperate with Hao on her book and CEO Sam Altman has publicly criticised Hao's book on social media.

== Summary ==
Hao covers the departure of early investor Elon Musk, the reinstatement of Chief Executive Officer Sam Altman after being forced out by OpenAI's board, and reports from Colombia, the Philippines, Venezuela, and Kenya, where she interviews low-wage contract workers that categorized the severity of graphic content used to train ChatGPT. The book also covers OpenAI's former chief scientist Ilya Sutskever interest in developing artificial general intelligence (AGI) by summer 2023, while also becoming concerned about the way OpenAI was handling the technology it was developing.

== Reception ==
This book is one of two written about OpenAI that were released around the same time, the other being Keach Hagey's The Optimist: Sam Altman, OpenAI, and the Race to Invent the Future. Both authors used the majority of the same sources when they did their research. Hao's book is noted to be "broader and more critical of the two" and "darker", and "dispels any doubt that OpenAI’s belief in ushering in AGI to benefit all of humanity had messianic undertones". Some writers have compared Hao's book to historian William Dalrymple's The Anarchy: The Relentless Rise of the East India Company.

In November 2025, after fact-checking by Andy Masley and others, Karen Hao stated on her X account that the published version of the book mistakenly overestimates the water usage of a data center in Chile by a factor of 1,000x due to a unit conversion error. The discovery of this error was covered in media outlets such as Wired.

== Awards ==
Hao received the 2025 National Book Critics Circle Award for Nonfiction, and the 2026 New York Public Library’s Helen Bernstein Book Award for Excellence in Journalism for the book.

== See also ==
- Data colonialism
- Disaster capitalism
- Ethics of artificial intelligence
- Atlas of AI
- Feeding the Machine
- Appen – company covered by the book
- Mosacat – activist group covered by the book
