= Notes from Below =

UK-based socialist worker magazine

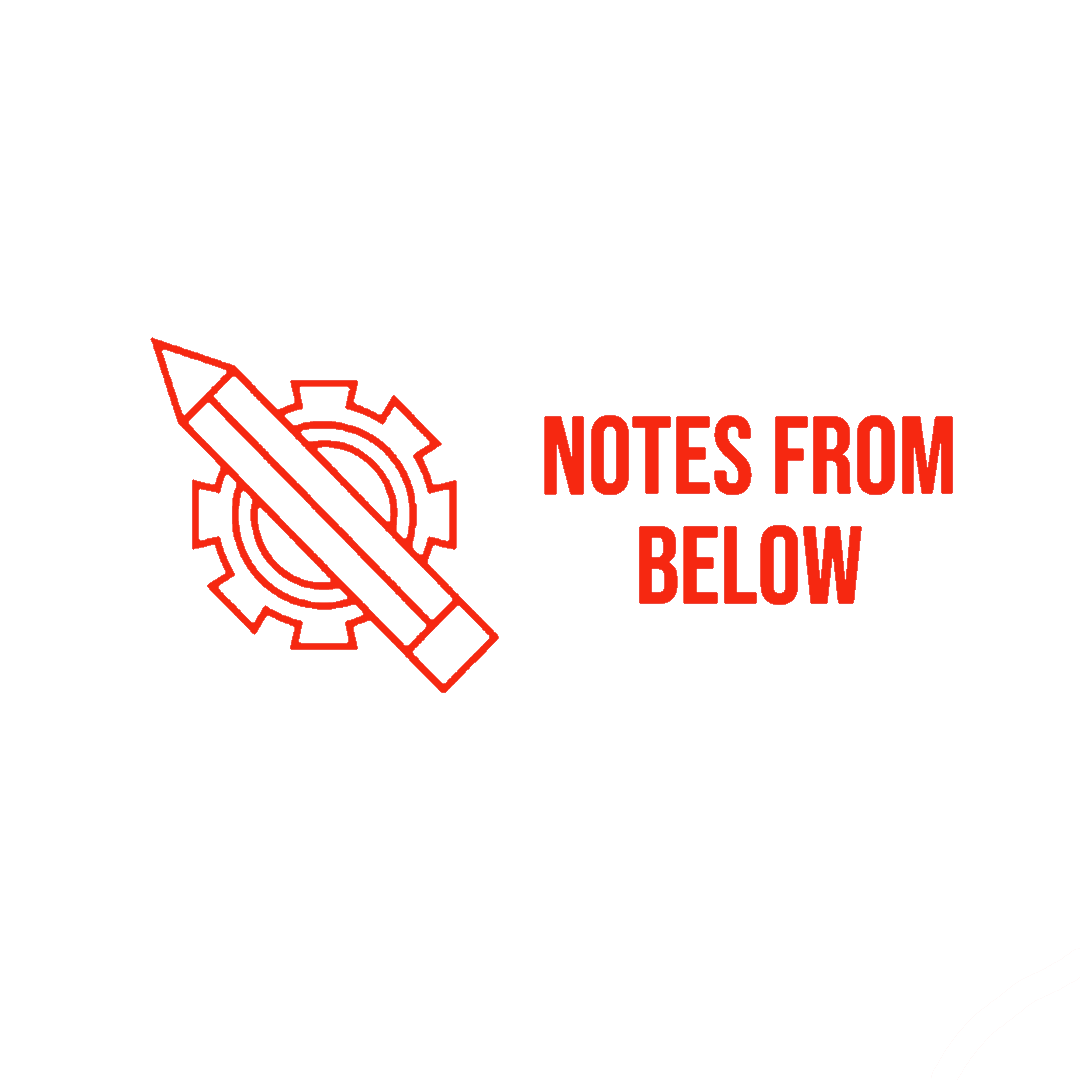
- Categories: Work, Politics, Class Struggle
- Frequency: Tri-annually
- Format: Digital, Print
- Founded: 2018
- Country: United Kingdom
- Language: English
- Website: notesfrombelow.org
- ISSN: 2631-9284

Notes from Below, founded in 2018, is a UK-based political project that publishes online-articles, a growing book series, a podcast called Workers' Inquiry, alongside a digital and print journal produced tri-annually. It publishes "workers' inquiries" and contemporary class analyses that uses class composition theory. The editors, including Jamie Woodcock and Callum Cant, have modeled their work after the Italian journal Quaderni Rossi, the US based Johnson–Forest Tendency, French collective Socialisme ou Barbarie, and early surveys about working conditions conducted by Karl Marx. Through the inquiries it publishes, the project promotes class composition analysis and workerism.

The inquiries featured in the journal have included workers in call centers, Amazon delivery centers, universities, tech companies, and pubs and its coverage has focused on small, militant unions like the Independent Workers' Union of Great Britain. It also publishes political writing, most explicitly in Issue 19 of the journal titled The Political Leap: Communist Strategy Today.

Notes from Below had contributed to a 2018 University and College Union (UCU) pension strike by publishing bulletins and circulating an open letter in support of the strike. It also hosts the bulletin The University Worker.

In 2020, Notes from Below was awarded a grant from the Barry Amiel & Norman Melburn Trust to produce a special issue. From April 2023, they began to publish their journal in print, with three issues being released a year.

In July 2026, Notes from Below published a special collaboration with Strike Map called Workers Make History.

== Bibliography ==
- Cant, Callum; Englert, Sai; Hughes, Lydia; Liu, Wendy; Marotta, Achille; Wheeler, Seth; Woodcock, Jamie (2020). "Notes from Below: A Brief Survey of Class Composition in the UK". In Ovetz, Robert (ed.). Workers' inquiry and global class struggle : strategies, tactics, objectives. London. pp. 174–194. ISBN 9781786806451.
- James Butler, Jessica Thorne, Callum Cant and Seth Wheeler (18 March 2018). Notes From Below: No Politics Without Inquiry!. Novara Media.

== See also ==
- Criticism of capitalism
- Critique of political economy
- Critique of work
- Historical Materialism (journal)
