= Algorithms to Live By =

2016 non-fiction book by Tom Griffiths and Brian Christian

- Author: Brian Christian and Tom Griffiths
- Publisher: Henry Holt
- Publication date: April 19, 2016
- Pages: 368
- ISBN: 978-1-62779-036-9

Algorithms to Live By: The Computer Science of Human Decisions is a 2016 non-fiction book by Brian Christian and Tom Griffiths.

== Synopsis ==
The book explores the heuristics underlying both human and computer decision making.

== Reception ==
Kirkus Reviews gave the book a positive review, describing it as "An entertaining, intelligently presented book for the numerate and computer literate.". Dale Farris, in Library Journal, praised the book, writing that its "moderately paced, TED Talk-style narration focuses listeners' attention throughout this fascinating exploration." Amber Tose, in the Berkeley Science Review, wrote that "Beyond revealing convenient heuristics for solving some of life’s annoyances, the text is laced with a sweet optimism regarding human behavior". Julian Humphreys reviewed the book in Philosophy of Coaching.
