= Feeding the Machine (book) =

2024 book

- Author: James Muldoon, Mark Graham and Callum Cant
- Publisher: Bloomsbury Publishing
- Publication date: August 6, 2024
- ISBN: 9781639734962

Feeding the Machine: The Hidden Human Labour Powering AI is a 2024 book by James Muldoon, Mark Graham and Callum Cant.

== Writing ==
The authors developed the concept for the book while doing fieldwork studying data annotation in developing countries in East Africa.

== Synopsis ==
The book examines the human input needed to develop and sustain AI ecosystems.

== Reception ==
The book received positive reviews. Rosalie Waelen of Capital & Class gave it a mostly positive review. Tim Hornyak of Literary Review praised it.

Kirkus Reviews called it "A sobering and timely—if sometimes distracted—study of AI.". Publishers Weekly gave the book a starred review, writing that "The grim real-life stories read like dystopian parables, such as the account of a European voice actor whose recordings were legally used without her consent to create an inexpensive synthetic clone whom she now competes with for business. Driven by striking reporting and finely observed profiles, this unsettles."

== See also ==
- Empire of AI
