= Robert Kotlowitz =

American author and television producer

Robert Kotlowitz (November 21, 1924 - August 25, 2012) was a television producer, documentary filmmaker, and writer. His 1972 novel Somewhere Else won the National Jewish Book Award. While a producer at WNET/THIRTEEN, he helped created a number of influential shows such as The MacNeil/Lehrer Report (later renamed PBS NewsHour) and Live at the Met, with the shows called "a high-water mark in American television."

== Life ==
Kotlowitz was born in 1924, in Madison, New Jersey. He was brought up in Baltimore. He was the son of Max and Debra Kotlowitz.

In the summer of 1943, he was drafted out of college and given basic training at Fort Benning. And after 13 weeks of basic training, he was sent off to the University of Maine in Orono to study engineering as part of the Army Specialized Training Program. In 1944, he was assigned to the 104th Infantry Regiment, 26th Infantry Division. After six months more training in Tennessee he sailed from New York Harbor on August 27, 1944, on the SS Argentina as part of a convoy of up to 100 ships. The 26th Infantry Division arrived in Cherbourg on September 7, 1944.

Kotlowitz served in the Lorraine Campaign and was part of an ill-fated American assault against German troops in France in October 1944, which he described in a 1995 article in The New York Times Magazine and in Before Their Time: A Memoir, published in 1999. In the book he tells the story of the massacre of his 46-man platoon, where he was one of only three survivors, and the only survivor who was not wounded.

After the war, Kotlowitz studied at Johns Hopkins University and the Peabody Conservatory of Music in Baltimore. He later worked as a managing editor of Harper's Magazine, being on the magazine's staff from 1959 to 1971, and as a television producer and senior vice president at WNET/THIRTEEN.

While at WNET/THIRTEEN, Kotlowitz helped create a number of influential shows such as The MacNeil/Lehrer Report (later renamed PBS NewsHour), Live at the Met, Dance in America and Brideshead Revisited. The shows Kotlowitz helped create "deeply influenced PBS programming" and have been called by The New York Times a "high-water mark in American television."

He was married to Billie Leibowitz Kotlowitz, who died in 1994. He had two sons, including author Alex Kotlowitz.

Kotlowitz died on August 25, 2012, in New York City.

== Writing career ==
Kotlowitz wrote five books, all of which have refer to his home city of Baltimore, Maryland. His novel Somewhere Else (1972) won the National Jewish Book Award in 1973.

== Bibliography ==
- Somewhere Else (1972)
- The Boardwalk (1977)
- Sea Changes (1986)
- His Master’s Voice (1992)
- Before Their Time: A Memoir (1999), a memoir of his war years.
