= Shane Harris =

American journalist and author

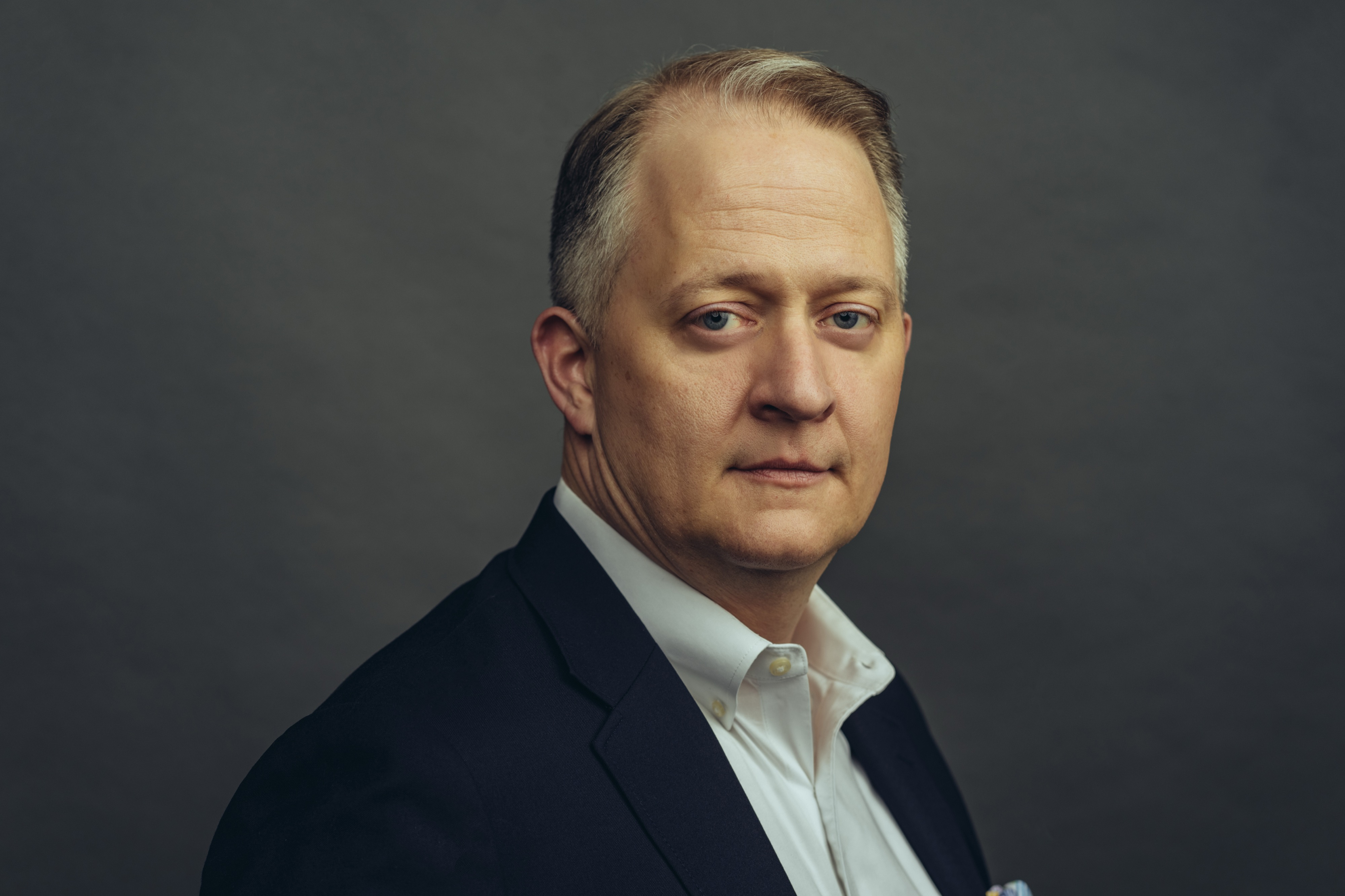
- Harris in 2025
- Education: Wake Forest University (BA)
- Occupation: Journalist
- Employer: The Atlantic
- Notable work: The Watchers

Shane Harris is an American journalist, author and staff writer of The Atlantic. He was a senior national security writer at the Washington Post. He specializes in coverage of America's intelligence agencies. He is the author of the books The Watchers: The Rise of America's Surveillance State and @War: The Rise of the Military-Internet Complex, about the impact of cyberspace as the American military's "fifth-domain" of war.

Harris is currently an ASU Future of War Fellow at the New America Foundation. He was also a co-host of the podcasts Rational Security and Chatter.

== Career ==
Shane Harris joined the Washington Post in January 2018, after having written for the Wall Street Journal. Harris was previously the Senior Intelligence and National Security Correspondent for the Daily Beast in 2014, a senior writer for Foreign Policy magazine, a senior writer for The Washingtonian, and a staff correspondent at National Journal from 2005-2010. In fall 2024, Harris became a staff writer for The Atlantic.

== Political views ==
Harris is known to be a strong opponent of the worldwide mass surveillance activities of the U.S. National Security Agency (NSA). In an interview with TIME magazine, Harris said that "We've crossed into this era where surveillance and surveillance capabilities in the government are just a reality", and expressed doubt that the United States Congress will limit the practice of mass surveillance in the United States.

== Journalism honors ==
In 2010, Harris received the 24th annual Gerald R. Ford Prize for "Distinguished Reporting on National Defense". In 2019, Harris and others at the Washington Post were finalists for the Pulitzer Prize for Public Service for their coverage of the assassination of Jamal Khashoggi by Saudi Arabia's Crown Prince Mohammed bin Salman. He was part of the team of reporters at the Washington Post that won the 2022 Pulitzer Prize for Public Service for coverage of the January 6 attack on the U.S. Capitol. In 2023, he co-reported the documentary "The Discord Leaks" with PBS Frontline, which was nominated for an Emmy for Outstanding Investigative News Coverage. His 2024 podcast "Bacon: The Best Kept Secret in Washington," was a finalist for the National Magazine Awards.

== Works ==
Harris is the author of The Watchers: The Rise of America's Surveillance State, which won the Helen Bernstein Book Award for Excellence in Journalism in 2011. The Economist named it one of several "Books of the Year" (2010). He is also the author of @War: The Rise of the Military-Internet Complex.

== See also ==
- Glenn Greenwald
- James Bamford
- Russian bounty program
