= Patricia Evangelista =

Filipina journalist and documentary filmmaker

Pat Evangelista
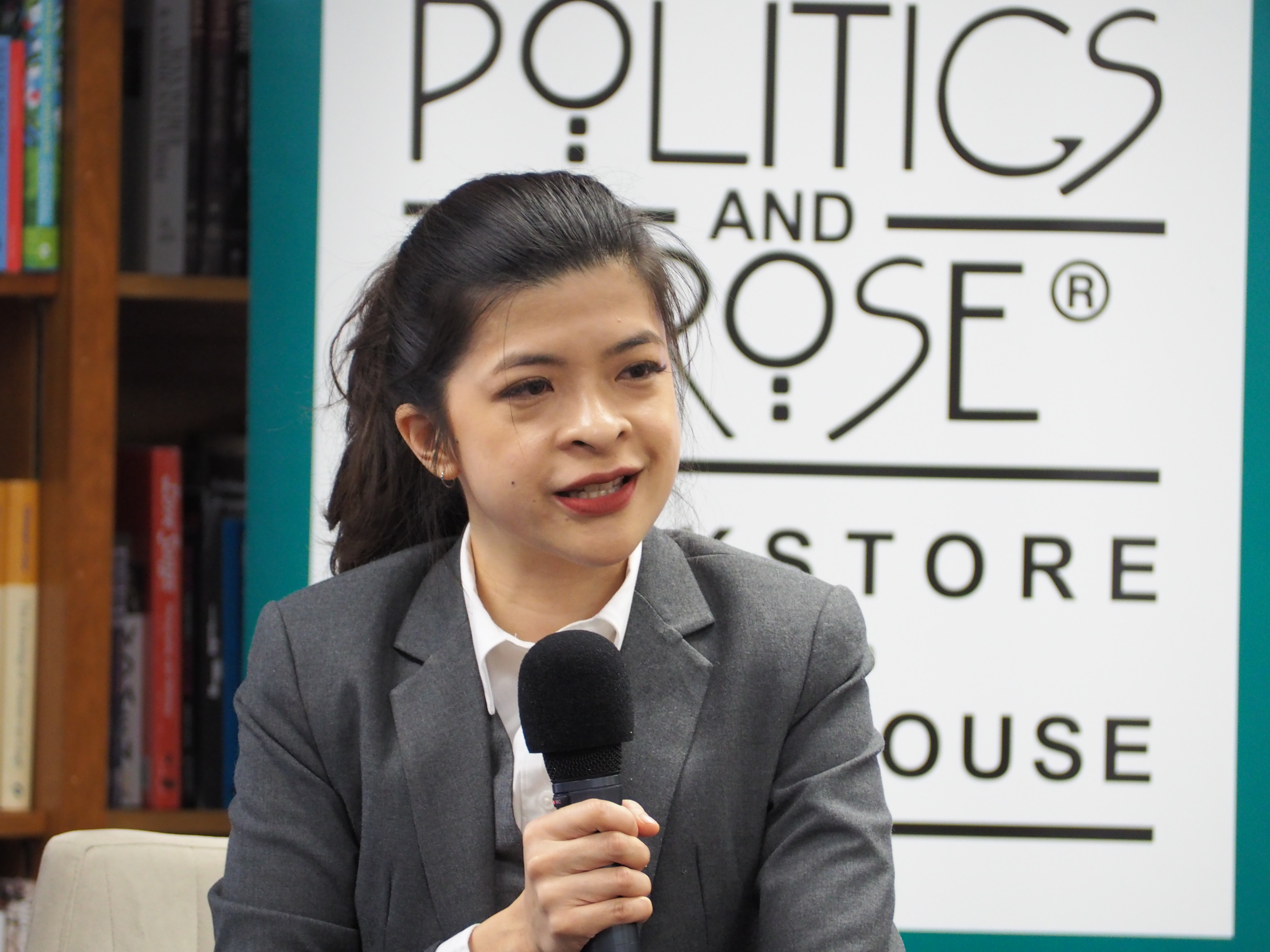
- Born: Patricia Chanco Evangelista
- Education: Saint Theresa's College of Quezon City; University of the Philippines Diliman (BA)
- Occupation: Journalist

Patricia Chanco Evangelista is a Filipina trauma journalist and documentary filmmaker based in Manila, whose coverage focuses mostly on conflict, disaster and human rights. She is a multimedia reporter for online news agency Rappler and is a writer-at-large for Esquire magazine. Her first book, Some People Need Killing, came out in 2023.

== Education ==
Evangelista finished high school at Saint Theresa's College of Quezon City. She graduated cum laude with a degree of BA Speech Communication from the University of the Philippines Diliman in 2006. She is an alumna of the UP Debate Society.

== Career ==
At the age of 19, in 2004, Evangelista first came to national attention when she became the first Filipino to win the London-based annual International Public Speaking Championships - an annual competition sponsored by the English-Speaking Union held in London. Her speech entitled Blonde and Blue Eyes for the theme Borderless World, bested 59 contestants from 37 countries.

=== Early career ===
She was first published as a youth columnist by The Philippine Star, and then went on to write a weekly column for the Philippine Daily Inquirer's opinion section that ran for nine years. She has written for Rogue magazine and UNO.

Evangelista had her start in television journalism as a production assistant for ABS-CBN News Channel (ANC). She went on to produce a number of programs and documentaries, including the groundbreaking narrative series, Storyline that ran over the ABS-CBN News Channel for five years. She also wrote and produced the short film series AmBisyon and Kinse. She was the executive producer behind ANC's Truths, a three-part investigative documentary on abortion, disaster, and human rights.

She is a fellow of the South East Asian Press Alliance (SEAPA), is a Titus Brandsma Awardee for Emergent Journalism and was part of Devex's 2012 40 under 40.

She is the co-founder of Storyline Productions with filmmaker Paolo Villaluna. Her various television projects have been recipients of a number of local awards including the Gawad Tanglaw, the Catholic Mass Media Award, as well as three New York Festivals medals.

Evangelista's short film on the aftermath of Supertyphoon Haiyan won the media prize at the Ministerial Conference for Disaster Risk Reduction in Thailand in 2014. She was also awarded the 2014 Kate Webb Prize for frontline journalism.

She is a field reporter for Rappler, producing documentary and news pieces as well as analysis for the Thought Leaders section. As a writer-at-large for Esquire magazine since its inception, Evangelista writes long-form journalism pieces and profiles politicians and newsmakers.

=== Some People Need Killing: A Memoir of Murder in My Country ===
In October 2023, Evangelista published a memoir, Some People Need Killing, about her time reporting on the drug war by former president Rodrigo Duterte in the Philippines. David Remnick called it a "journalistic masterpiece" in The New Yorker. The book was included on Time's The 100 Must Read Books of 2023 list, as well as The New York Times 10 Best Books of 2023 list. It was also longlisted for the 2024 Women's Prize for Non-Fiction, and won the 2024 Helen Bernstein Book Award for Excellence in Journalism.

== Bibliography ==
- Evangelista, Patricia (2023-10-17). Some People Need Killing. Random House. ISBN 978-0-593-13313-2.

== See also ==
- Maria Ressa
- Nicole Curato
- Paolo Villaluna
