= Tom Griffiths (cognitive scientist) =

American cognitive scientist

- Born: London, England
- Education: University of Western Australia; Stanford University
- Scientific career
- Fields: Psychology; Cognitive science
- Workplaces: University of California, Berkeley; Princeton University
- Thesis: Causes, coincidences, and theories (2005)
- Doctoral advisor: Joshua Tenenbaum

Thomas L. Griffiths (born c. 1978) is an Australian academic who is the Henry R. Luce Professor of Information Technology, Consciousness, and Culture at Princeton University. He studies human decision-making and its connection to problem-solving methods in computation. His book with Brian Christian, Algorithms to Live By: The Computer Science of Human Decisions, was named one of the "Best Books of 2016" by MIT Technology Review.

== Biography ==
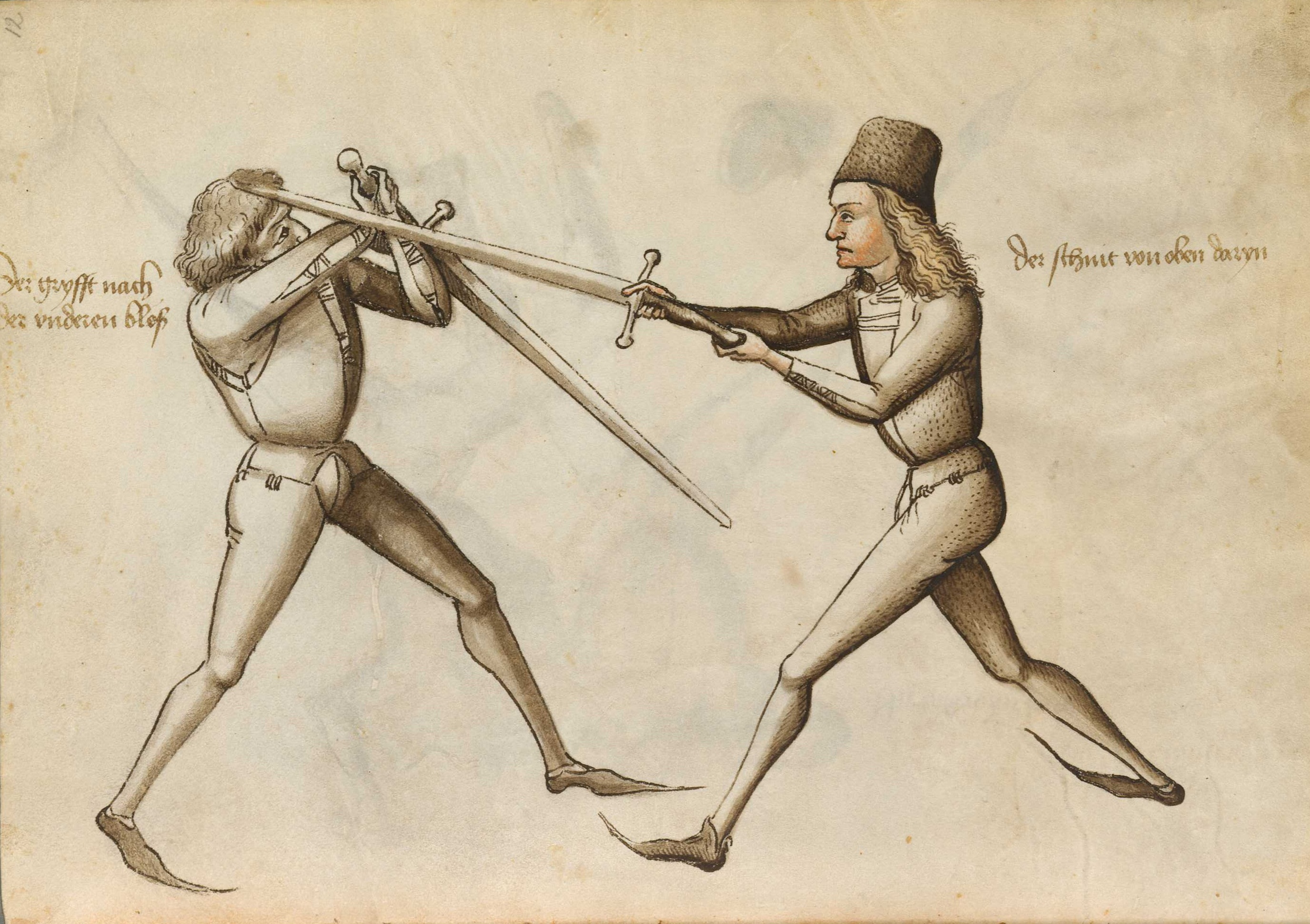
Fencing with longswords, from a fifteenth-century manual of fencing

Griffiths was born in London but moved with his family when he was eight to Perth, Australia.

Growing up, Griffiths enjoyed computer programming and online role-playing games. At twelve, he started fencing, which he says involves "interesting computational problems", becoming "an avid fencer". He developed a method to break down complex fencing moves into simpler ones that could be performed in sequence, but gave up on the theory after, he says, "I messed up the math and a longsword broke my right wrist."

Griffiths received his undergraduate degree in psychology from the University of Western Australia.

He applied to Stanford University for graduate school in psychology, hoping to work on mathematical models of human cognition with David Rumelhart or Roger Shepard, not realizing that both had just retired. Instead, Joshua Tenenbaum, who was working on Bayesian cognitive science, became his thesis advisor. His work with Tenenbaum used Bayesian statistics as well as principles from AI and machine learning and to explore topics in cognitive psychology, such as learning, memory, and categorization. When Tenenbaum left Stanford for MIT, Griffiths accompanied him, becoming an exchange student there. Griffiths earned master's degrees in both psychology and statistics from Stanford, as well as a Stanford Ph.D. in psychology in 2005.

After teaching briefly at Brown University, he moved to Berkeley in 2006 as an assistant professor in the Department of Psychology and Cognitive Science Program. In 2010, he became an associate professor and the director of Berkeley's Institute of Cognitive and Brain Sciences. He became a full professor at Berkeley in 2015.

In 2018, Griffiths was hired by Princeton, as a joint appointment by the Department of Computer Science and the Department of Psychology. At Princeton, he is the Henry R. Luce Professor of Information Technology, Consciousness, and Culture. On his Princeton webpage, Griffiths explains that his research explores the connection between human problem solving and related methods in computation and logic: "People solve challenging computational problems every day, making predictions about future events, learning new causal relationships, or discovering how objects should be divided into categories. My research investigates how this is possible, first identifying the nature of the underlying computational problems, and then examining whether we can explain aspects of human behavior as the result of approximating optimal solutions to those problems."

== Awards ==
In 2011 the Association for Psychological Science awarded Griffiths its Janet Taylor Spence Award for Transformative Early Career Contributions, recognizing his work exploring "mathematical models of human cognition".

In 2012 he won American Psychological Association's Award for Distinguished Scientific Early Career Contributions to Psychology "for bringing mathematical precision to the deepest questions in human learning, reasoning, and concept formation."

In 2014, Griffiths received a Cognitive Science Society Award. At that time, he was "director of the Computational Cognitive Science Lab and the Institute of Cognitive and Brain Sciences at the University of California, Berkeley." In 2019, the National Academy of Sciences awarded Griffiths its $75,000 Troland Research Award "for his research into how people and machines make decisions."

In 2017, while at Berkeley, Griffiths was awarded a John Simon Guggenheim Memorial Foundation fellowship, an award given "on the basis of prior achievement and exceptional promise." Berkeley described his work at that time as follows: "His research explores connections between human and machine learning, using ideas from statistics and artificial intelligence to understand how people solve the challenging computational problems they encounter in everyday life."

== Publications ==
In 2016, Griffiths co-authored a book, Algorithms to Live By: The Computer Science of Human Decisions, with Brian Christian. Kirkus Reviews described it as "An entertaining, intelligently presented book for the numerate and computer literate." David DiSalvo, author of What Makes Your Brain Happy and Why You Should Do the Opposite, called Algorithms to Live By a "surprisingly useful book that travels from computer science to human decision-making ... a dense primer on the algorithms of decision-making and a tip-filled guide for making better decisions."

In The Guardian, Oliver Burkeman wrote that he "wasn't predisposed to love Algorithms To Live By" but by the end of the book was convinced that "computing algorithms could be a surprisingly useful way to embrace the messy compromises of real, non-Vulcan life." MIT Technology Review listed it as one of their "Best Books of 2016."

Griffiths released The Laws of Thought: The Quest for a Mathematical Theory of the Mind in 2026. Siobhan Roberts describes it as "a rigorous and captivating account of how cognition can be modeled via three mathematical frameworks: logic, artificial neural networks (“mathematical systems that emulate the operation of the brain”) and probability theory."

== Personal life ==
Griffiths is married to fellow Princeton psychology professor Tania Lombrozo. and has two daughters.
