= My Friends Told Me About You =

- Directed by: Daniel Ryan
- Written by: Carlos Dengler; Daniel Ryan
- Produced by: Carlos Dengler; Todd Eckert; Lara Khajetoorians Larkin
- Starring: Carlos Dengler; Risa Sarachan; Frederic Stone
- Cinematography: Daniel Ryan
- Edited by: Daniel Ryan; Josh Diamond
- Music by: Carlos Dengler
- Release date: February 2008
- Running time: 25'31"
- Country: United States
- Language: English

My Friends Told Me About You is a short film written, produced, and scored by lead actor Carlos Dengler who is the former bassist of the band Interpol. It is co-written and directed by Daniel Ryan and co-produced by Todd Eckert of award-winning Joy Division biopic, Control. The cast also includes Risa Sarachan as Belle and Fredric Stone as Stanley. The film was shot on digital video tape, in and around the Chicago area during 2007 and 2008. Its narrative employs non-linear, surrealistic techniques influenced by Mulholland Drive, Buffalo 66, and The Limey. The film is included on the DVD magazine Wholphin No. 8.

== Synopsis ==
My Friends Told Me About You charts the journey of a man at the beginning of a downward spiral. Paranoia, confusion, and anger start to color all that he knows to be true and as reality blurs with his subconscious fears, an alternate world propelled by violence and mistrust begins to take over. As sonic as it is visual, Dengler also composed the original score for My Friends Told Me About You in collaboration with acclaimed English clarinettist Ian Mitchell.

== Music ==
Carlos Dengler composed the original score for the film which includes the contribution of English clarinettist Ian Mitchell.
