= Some People Need Killing =

2023 book by Patricia Evangelista

- Author: Patricia Evangelista
- Language: English
- Subject: Philippine drug war
- Genre: Nonfiction
- Publisher: Random House
- Publication date: 2023
- Publication place: Philippines
- Pages: 448
- ISBN: 9780593133132

Some People Need Killing: A Memoir of Murder in My Country is a 2023 book by journalist Patricia Evangelista, published by Random House. The book documents the thousands of Filipinos killed by extrajudicial death squads and vigilantes during the administration of the president of the Philippines, Rodrigo Duterte.

== Synopsis ==
The book documents some of the extrajudicial killings of Philippine citizens that occurred during the presidential tenure of Philippine president Rodrigo Duterte from 2016 to 2022, with many killings being conducted by death squads which were emboldened by the president. The Philippine National Police estimates the death toll of the extrajudicial killings at 8,000, with higher estimates of dead as high as 30,000. Duterte had admittedly employed death squads (Davao Death Squad) to kill low level criminals, drug dealers, and drug users during his more than two-decade tenure as mayor of Davao City. During his successful presidential run in 2016, he campaigned on his plan to kill suspected criminals. Evangelista interviewed families of the victims, as well as members of the death squads. The title comes from a quote from a perpetrator describing his actions as making his neighborhood safer for his children by killing suspected criminals: "I'm not all bad. Some people need killing".

== Publication ==
Some People Need Killing was first published by Random House on October 17, 2023. It was her debut book. An audiobook was published as well, read by Corey Wilson.

== Reception ==
Writing for The New York Times, Jennifer Szalai stated that Evangelista vividly documented the killings, portraying the grief experienced by her and others due to such senseless killings. Szalai stated: "She pays close attention to language, and not only because she is a writer. Language can be used to communicate, to deny, to threaten, to cajole. Duterte’s language is coarse and degrading. Evangelista’s is evocative and exacting." The book was named one of the ten best books of 2023 by The New York Times as well as being one of the 100 must read books of 2023 according to Time magazine.

The book has been translated into Spanish and Catalan, and has also been favorably reviewed by critics reviewing both translations. Reviewing the Spanish translation for El Economista, Ana Gómez Viñas described it as a "true crime in the exercise of combative journalism which reminds us of the importance of asking uncomfortable questions", while Carlos Garfella, reviewing the Catalan translation for El País, wrote that Some People Need Killing "has reminded me of some of the best literary journalism", comparing Evangelista to the likes of Oriana Fallaci and Svetlana Alexievich.

== Awards ==
The book was longlisted for the 2024 Women's Prize for Non-Fiction, and won the 2024 Helen Bernstein Book Award for Excellence in Journalism.
