= Callum Cant =

British academic

- Born: Basingstoke, Hampshire, England
- Education: Warwick University; Sussex University; University of West London
- Occupations: Author, researcher, lecturer
- Writing career
- Subjects: Gig economy and left-wing politics
- Website: www.strategyofrefusal.com

Callum Cant is a British author, researcher and labour rights advocate known for his contributions regarding workers in the gig economy. He is a lecturer in management at Essex Business School.

== Early life and education ==
Cant was born in Hampshire and privately educated at Lord Wandsworth College, the universities of Warwick and Sussex, and the University of West London, where he completed his PhD. His thesis, titled "'We are a service class': a workers’ inquiry into the class composition of service commodity production during the unreal interregnum", focused on understanding the class composition of young, precarious, disorganised, and low-paid service sector workers in the UK.

== Career ==
Cant was the head of communications at Momentum during the 2019 general election. Upon leaving Momentum, he returned to research and completed a postdoctoral position at the Oxford Internet Institute, University of Oxford, collaborating on the 'Fairwork AI' project with the Global Partnership on Artificial Intelligence.

Cant has contributed over 100 articles to publications such as The Guardian, The Independent and Novara Media. From 2018 to 2019, he penned a column 'Stay Classy' for Vice, focusing on strikes in the UK.

Currently, Cant is a senior lecturer in management at Essex Business School as well as an editor for Notes from Below, for which he hosts a podcast called, Workers' Inquiry.

=== Research and publications ===
Cant's research interests include artificial intelligence, platform capitalism, algorithmic management, workers’ inquiry, class composition, trade unions, and industrial relations. He has written a book, Riding for Deliveroo: Resistance in the New Economy which investigates class conflict in platform capitalism. In 2024 he published Feeding the Machine: The Hidden Human Labour Powering AI with James Muldoon and Mark Graham, an investigation into people exploited by AI. He has co-authored academic articles such as "Fast Food Shutdown: From disorganisation to action in the service sector" in Capital & Class and "Digital workerism: Technology, Platforms, and the Circulation of Workers’ Struggles" in tripleC: Communication, Capitalism & Critique. In 2026, he authored The Future in our Past: The General Strike, 1926/2026 with Matthew Lee, which covers the 1926 United Kingdom general strike.
