= Patrick Tyler =

American journalist (born 1951)

- Born: November 6, 1951 (age 74); St. Louis, Missouri, U.S.
- Education: University of South Carolina
- Occupation: Journalist
- Employer(s): The New York Times (1990—2004); The Washington Post (1979–1990)

Patrick E. Tyler is an author and formerly chief correspondent for The New York Times. He is the author of four books: Fortress Israel: The Inside Story of the Military Elite Who Run the Country -- and Why They Can't Make Peace, A World of Trouble: The White House and the Middle East from the Cold War to the War on Terror, A Great Wall: Six Presidents and China (a history of China–United States relations since the 1972 opening by President Richard Nixon) and Running Critical: The Silent War, Rickover and General Dynamics, a history of the United States nuclear submarine program under Admiral Hyman G. Rickover.

== Early newspaper and television experience ==
Tyler studied physics at the University of Texas in 1969–70 and transferred to journalism at the University of South Carolina, graduating in 1974. He edited two weekly newspapers in South Carolina, worked as a reporter for The Charlotte News and the St. Petersburg Times, and then joined The Washington Post in 1979. He spent nearly a year hosting Congressional Outlook, a national public affairs television program on the Public Broadcasting System (PBS) that examined issues before Congress. The program was a joint venture between Congressional Quarterly and WCET-Cincinnati.

== Libel suit ==
While at the Post, he worked under Bob Woodward, then Metropolitan Editor, and in his first year at the newspaper wrote a story critical of William P. Tavoulareas, then president of Mobil Oil Corp, which led to a $50-million libel suit against the newspaper. The story alleged that Tavoulareas and Mobil had not adequately disclosed under the related-party transaction rules of the Securities and Exchange Commission a series of transactions that enriched Tavoulareas' son, Peter, who was a young shipping clerk in London until the dealings of his firm with Mobil made him an overnight millionaire due to the exclusive, no-bid contracts Mobil granted the firm to manage ships under a Mobil-Saudi joint venture. The article suggested that Tavoulareas had been guilty of nepotism and failure to disclose the dealings with his son's firm to shareholders in installing his son as chairman. Mobil sued The Washington Post and secured a 2 million dollar verdict, which was overturned by the trial judge, who entered a judgment in favor of The Washington Post notwithstanding the verdict.

The trial judge's verdict was later reversed by a three-judge panel of the United States Court of Appeals in the District of Columbia, whose split (2–1) verdict against the newspaper led to an appeal to the full Court of Appeals. The Appellate Court ruled 7–1 in favor of the Post, citing the truthfulness of every major assertion in the Post's article. The Post's case was argued by a team of lawyers under Edward Bennett Williams. The Appellate Court included then Appellate Court judges Antonin Scalia, Ruth Bader Ginsburg and Kenneth Starr. Tyler later praised the Post, commenting "I had thought my career was over, and so their determination to take the case all the way to the Supreme Court if necessary was one of the most singular acts of editorial courage ... that I had ever witnessed."

== Transition to The New York Times ==
External videos
- Booknotes interview with Tyler on A Great Wall, October 31, 1999, C-SPAN

In 1986, he published his first book, Running Critical, an exposé of the massive cost-overruns that afflicted the building of the Los Angeles class nuclear attack submarine fleet. Tyler conducted extensive interviews with Admiral Rickover and other senior United States military officers, as well as executives of General Dynamics, owners of Electric Boat Division.

Tyler continued to write for the Post until 1990, when he left to join The New York Times. While at the Times he wrote his second book, A Great Wall: Six Presidents and China: An Investigative History, which received the Lionel Gelber Prize in 2000. He has served in various posts at the Times, including as chief of the Beijing, Moscow, Baghdad and London news bureaus. He was promoted to chief correspondent in 2002 by then executive editor Howell Raines, and in 2003 he traveled to Kuwait to prepare and anchor the newspaper's coverage of the invasion of Iraq. After the fall of Saddam Hussein, he established the Times bureau in Iraq. Tyler moved to London in 2004, where he served as bureau chief until he resigned from the newspaper in December of that year to write a diplomatic history of American policy in the Middle East. He signed a contract in 2005 with Farrar, Straus & Giroux to produce A World of Trouble. In 2008, he signed a second contract with the same New York publisher to produce a political biography of Israel's leadership class.
