= Michael Langan (director) =

American film director (born 1984)

Michael Langan (born Providence, RI 1984) is an American film director. He grew up in Montgomery, Alabama, where he began his artistic career as a professional stage actor, and is a graduate of Rhode Island School of Design.

Langan's films typically involve technical experimentation, particularly the manipulation of time. Surreal sequences appear frequently in his films. He is known for his use of the experimental animation technique, pixilation, and his adaptation of the historical photographic technique, chronophotography.

His artistic influences include singer/composer Bobby McFerrin and filmmakers Norman McLaren, Zbigniew Rybczyński, Steven X. Arthur, and Jan Švankmajer. Notable awards include a Student Academy Award nomination, Most Promising Filmmaker at Ann Arbor Film Festival, and Best Experimental Short at Slamdance Film Festival.

== Short films ==
Langan's first student film, Snail, premiered at Ann Arbor Film Festival in March 2007. His undergraduate thesis film, Doxology, has received widespread acclaim, winning fourteen awards at over eighty film festivals worldwide.

Slamdance Film Festival commissioned Langan to complete a short film in 2008. The resulting film, Dahlia, which premiered at the festival the following year, has since screened at film festivals around the world and appeared on Showtime. The film is a three-minute portrait of San Francisco, Langan's home at the time, featuring a musical score composed by the filmmaker.

In 2010, Langan collaborated with author Brian Christian on a short film adaptation of Christian's poem, Heliotropes. The film was featured at twenty film festivals in 2011 and premiered online with The Atlantic on September 1, 2011. Heliotropes later appeared in the final edition of Wholphin (DVD) in February 2012.

Langan collaborated with Harvard lecturer Terah Maher on the 2011 dance film, Choros, building on the chronophotography work of Eadweard Muybridge, Etienne Jules Marey, and Norman McLaren. The film is scored with the 1976 composition Music for 18 Musicians by minimalist composer Steve Reich.

Langan returned to pixilation with his 2013 short film, Butler, Woman, Man (L'homme, la femme et le majordome), a French co-production of Paprika Films and Arte. The film premiered on French and German television broadcast in March, 2013.

== Music videos ==
In March 2014, Skrillex's Owsla record label released Hundred Waters - Cavity, a music video for the single by indie band Hundred Waters, directed by Michael Langan. The music video was premiered by NPR's Jacob Ganz, and subsequently covered by Pitchfork Media and The Huffington Post.

== Filmography ==
- Butler, Woman, Man (2013)
- Choros (2011)
- Heliotropes (2010)
- Dahlia (2008)
- Doxology (2007)
- Snail (2005)
