= Jeff Goodell =

American author and journalist

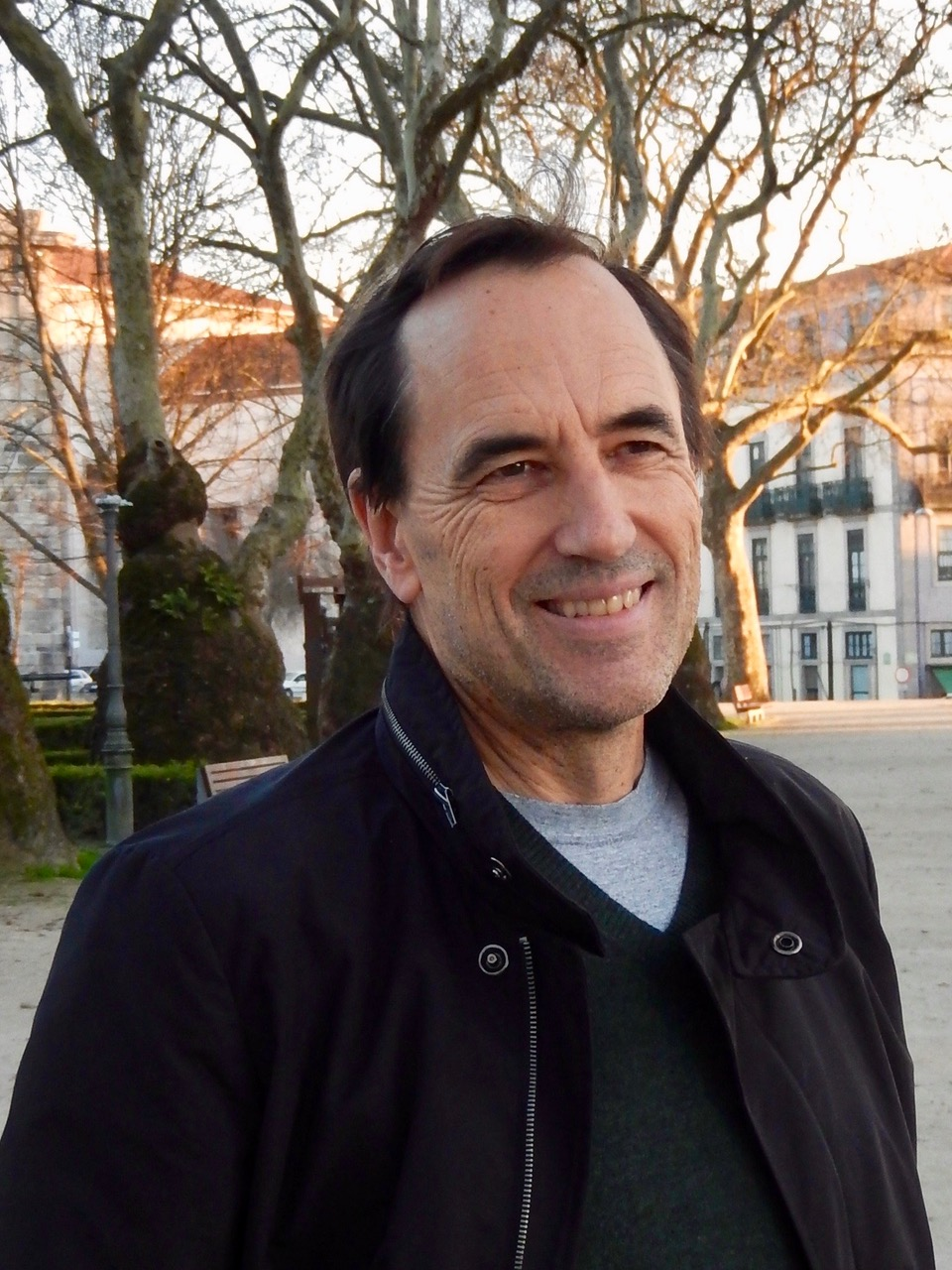
- Goodell in 2017
- Born: Palo Alto, California
- Occupations: Author, editor, journalist, writer
- Years active: 1990–present
- Known for: Contributing Writer to Rolling Stone
- Notable work: The Heat Will Kill You First: Life and Death on a Scorched Planet

Jeff Goodell is an American author of seven non-fiction books and a longtime contributing writer to Rolling Stone. Goodell's writings are known for a focus on energy and environmental issues. He is Senior Fellow at the Atlantic Council and a 2020 Guggenheim Fellow.

== Youth and education ==
Jeff Goodell was born in Palo Alto, California. He grew up in Sunnyvale and worked briefly at Apple Computer in the early 1980s. He graduated from University of California, Berkeley, in 1984, and then helped edit Zyzzyva, a literary magazine in San Francisco. He moved to New York City and attended graduate school at Columbia University, where he received an M.F.A. in 1990.

== Career ==
Goodell started his journalism career at 7 Days, a Manhattan weekly founded and edited by Adam Moss. He covered cops, crime, AIDS, and politics. In 1990, 7 Days won a National Magazine Award for General Excellence. After freelancing for a few years, Goodell became a contributing editor at Rolling Stone in 1995. Since then, he has written hundreds of pieces for the magazine, including cover stories about climate politics, Steve Jobs, and President Barack Obama.

Goodell has published seven books, including Sunnyvale (2000) a personal memoir about growing up in Silicon Valley and the breakdown of his family; Our Story: 77 Hours That Tested Our Friendship and Our Faith (2002), about the Pennsylvania Quecreek Mine Rescue of nine trapped coal miners in 2002 that was a New York Times Best Seller; and Big Coal: The Dirty Secret Behind America's Energy Future (2006) that the New York Times called "a compelling indictment of one of the country's biggest, most powerful and most antiquated industries...well-written, timely, and powerful".

In 2010, he published How to Cool the Planet: Geoengineering and the Audacious Quest to Fix Earth’s Climate about geoengineering, global warming, and climate change mitigation. The book discusses ideas by Ken Caldeira, James Lovelock, David Keith, Raymond Pierrehumbert, Stephen Salter, and Lowell Wood, among others. In 2011, How to Cool the Planet won the Grantham Prize (Award of Special Merit).

In 2017, he published The Water Will Come: Rising Seas, Sinking Cities, and the Remaking of the Civilized World that describes visits to places likely to be inundated by rising sea levels. It was a New York Times Critics Top Book of 2017 and selected by the Washington Post as one of the 50 best non-fiction books of 2017.

In 2023, he published The Heat Will Kill You First: Life and Death on a Scorched Planet. The book was a New York Times bestseller and selected by NPR and The Economist as one of the best books of 2023.

As a commentator on energy and climate issues, Goodell has appeared on NPR, MSNBC, CNN, CNBC, ABC, Fox News, and The Oprah Winfrey Show.

== Awards and honors ==
- 2011 Grantham Prize (Award of Special Merit)
- 2012 Sierra Club David R. Brower Award for excellence in environmental journalism
- 2020 American Meteorological Society Louis J. Battan Author's Award
- 2021 Covering Climate Now Journalism Award
- 2022 New York Press Club, "Feature: Science Medicine & Technology National" for "Deadly Climate" in Rolling Stone

== Fellowships ==
- 2016-2017 New America National Fellow
- 2020 Atlantic Council Senior Fellow
- 2020 Guggenheim Fellow

== Works ==
Books

- The Cyberthief and the Samurai: The True Story of Kevin Mitnick-And the Man Who Hunted Him Down (1996) ISBN 978-0-440-22205-7
- Sunnyvale: The Rise and Fall of a Silicon Valley Family (2000) ISBN 978-0-679-77638-3
- Our Story: 77 Hours That Tested Our Friendship and Our Faith (2002) ISBN 978-1-4013-0055-5
- Big Coal: The Dirty Secret Behind America's Energy Future (2006) ISBN 978-0-618-87224-4
- How to Cool the Planet: Geoengineering and the Audacious Quest to Fix Earth’s Climate (2010) ISBN 978-0-618-99061-0
- The Water Will Come: Rising Seas, Sinking Cities, and the Remaking of the Civilized World (2017) ISBN 978-0-316-26024-4
- The Heat Will Kill You First: Life and Death on a Scorched Planet (2023) ISBN 978-0316497572

Anthologies

- Best Business Writing 2012 (Columbia Journalism Review Books, 2012) ISBN 0231160739
- Best American Science Writing 2012 (Ecco, 2012) ISBN 0062117912
- Best American Science And Nature Writing 2022 (Mariner, 2022) ISBN 9780358615293

Audiobooks

- The Big Melt: A Journey to Antarctica's Doomsday Glacier
