= Brian Christian =

American non-fiction author and researcher

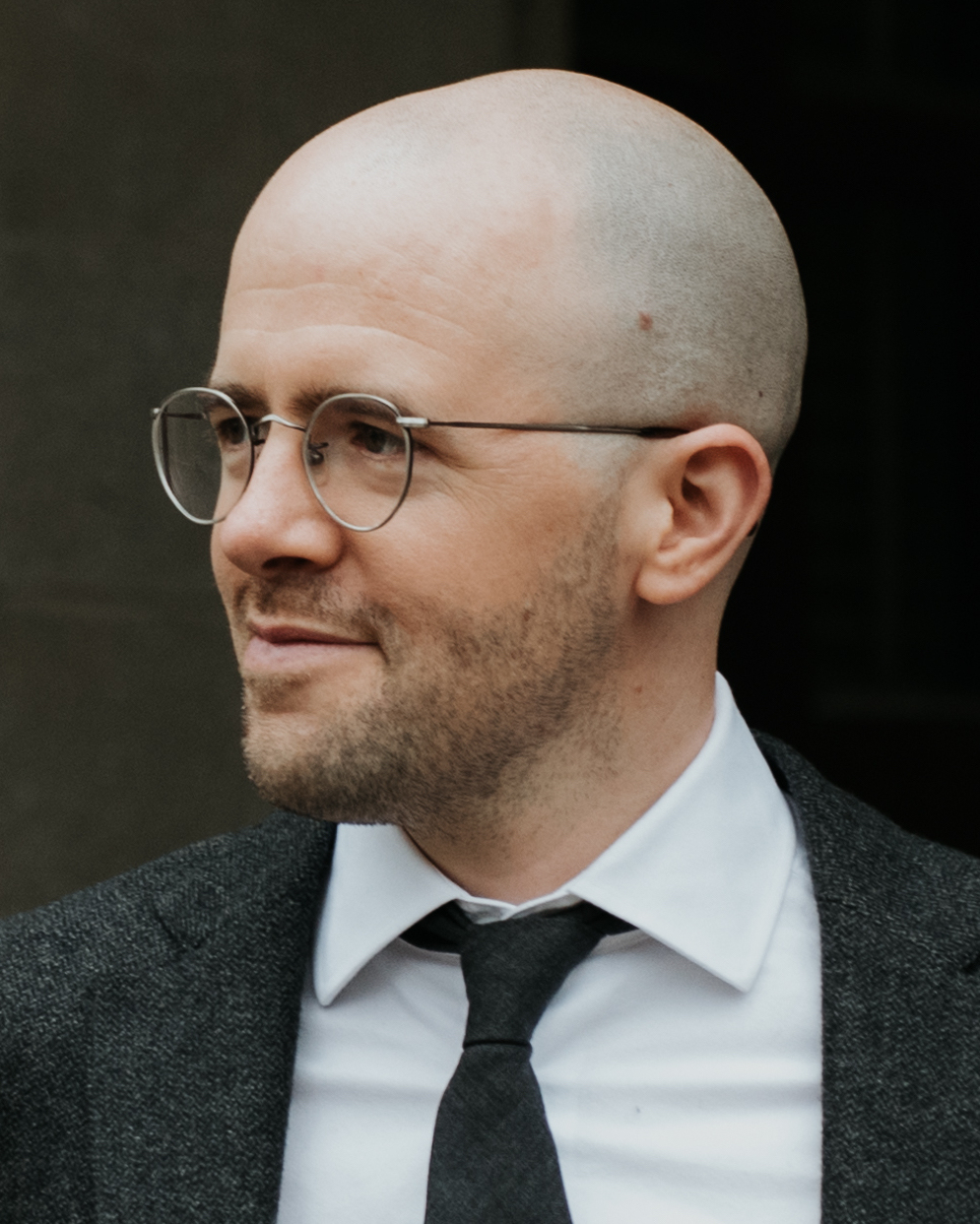
- Christian in 2019
- Born: 1984 (age 41–42); Wilmington, Delaware, US
- Education: Brown University (AB); University of Washington (MFA); University of Oxford (DPhil)
- Writing career
- Language: English
- Notable works: The Most Human Human (2011); Algorithms to Live By (2016); The Alignment Problem (2020)
- Scientific career
- Fields: Computational cognitive science, AI alignment
- Thesis: What Humans Want: Models of Preference, Choice, and Reward in Minds and Machines (2026)
- Doctoral advisor: Christopher Summerfield
- Website: brianchristian.org

Brian Christian (born 1984 in Wilmington, Delaware) is an American non-fiction author, researcher, poet, and programmer, best known for a bestselling series of books about the human implications of computer science, including The Most Human Human (2011), Algorithms to Live By (2016), and The Alignment Problem (2020).

== Early life and education ==
Christian is a native of Little Silver, New Jersey. He attended high school at High Technology High School in Lincroft, New Jersey.

Christian holds a degree from Brown University in computer science and philosophy, and an MFA in poetry from the University of Washington.

== Research and academic work ==
Beginning in 2012, Christian has been a visiting scholar at the University of California, Berkeley. At UC Berkeley, he is affiliated with a number of research groups, including the Institute of Cognitive and Brain Sciences, the Center for Information Technology Research in the Interest of Society, the Center for Human-Compatible Artificial Intelligence, and the Simons Institute for the Theory of Computing.

In 2023, he was awarded a Clarendon Scholarship to pursue a doctorate in experimental psychology, with co-supervision in engineering science, at Lincoln College at the University of Oxford.

Christian's research spans computational cognitive science and AI alignment, examining how formal systems in computer science intersect with human-centered questions in philosophy and psychology. Christian's work investigates topics including the computational structure of decision-making, reinforcement learning from human feedback (RLHF), and how reward models operationalize human preferences.

Christian has an Erdős number of 3.

== Books and publications ==
=== The Most Human Human ===
Christian competed as a "confederate" in the 2009 Loebner Prize competition, attempting to seem "more human" than the humans taking the test, and succeeded. The book he wrote about the experience, The Most Human Human, became a Wall Street Journal best-seller, a New York Times editors' choice, and a New Yorker favorite book of the year. He was interviewed by Jon Stewart on The Daily Show on March 8, 2011.

=== Algorithms to Live By ===
In 2016, Christian collaborated with cognitive scientist Tom Griffiths on the book Algorithms to Live By, which became the #1 bestselling nonfiction book on Audible and was named an Amazon best science book of the year and an MIT Technology Review best book of the year.

=== The Alignment Problem ===
In 2020, Christian published his third book of nonfiction, The Alignment Problem, which looks at the rise of the ethics and safety movement in machine learning through historical research and the stories of approximately 100 researchers. The Alignment Problem was named a finalist for the Los Angeles Times Book Prize for best science and technology book of the year. The New York Times in 2024 named The Alignment Problem one of the "5 Best Books About Artificial Intelligence," writing: "If you're going to read one book on artificial intelligence, this is the one."

=== Other writing ===
In 2025, Christian wrote the introduction for the 75th anniversary edition of Norbert Wiener's seminal work The Human Use of Human Beings, which explores the societal implications of cybernetics and automation.

== Software development and technical work ==
Christian worked in web development beginning in the 1990s, and has contributed to open-source projects such as Bundler and Ruby on Rails. From 2013 to 2022, he served as Director of Technology at McSweeney's Publishing, where he oversaw the successful launch of a new version of McSweeney's Internet Tendency in 2016 and its first audio issue, in collaboration with Radiotopia, in 2021.

== Influence and impact ==
In 2010, film director Michael Langan adapted Christian's poem "Heliotropes" into a short film of the same name, which was published in the final issue of Wholphin magazine.

In 2014, Vanity Fair magazine reported that The Most Human Human was the "night-table reading" of Elon Musk.

Reading The Most Human Human inspired the playwright Jordan Harrison to write the play Marjorie Prime. The play was a finalist for the Pulitzer Prize and was released as a feature film in 2017.

The Most Human Human also inspired filmmaker Tommy Pallotta's 2018 documentary More Human Than Human, in which Christian appears.

In 2018, Algorithms to Live By was featured as an answer on the game show Jeopardy!.

In 2021, Microsoft CEO Satya Nadella wrote in Fast Company that The Alignment Problem was one of the "5 books that inspired" him that year.

Writer Peter Brown has cited The Most Human Human as an inspiration for his book series The Wild Robot, which was adapted into the 2024 film of the same name.

== Bibliography ==
- The Most Human Human, 2011, Doubleday, ISBN 978-0307476708
- Algorithms to Live By, 2016, Henry Holt, ISBN 978-1250118363
- The Alignment Problem, 2020, Norton, ISBN 978-0393635829

== Awards and honors ==
Christian's awards and honors include:

- Eric and Wendy Schmidt Award for Excellence in Science Communication from The National Academies of Sciences, Engineering, and Medicine, given by in partnership with Schmidt Futures, for The Alignment Problem (2022)
- Clarendon Scholarship from the University of Oxford (2023)
- Publication in The Best American Science and Nature Writing (2012)
- Named a Laureate of the San Francisco Public Library (2016)
- Fellowships at the Bread Loaf Writers' Conference, Yaddo, and MacDowell (2008-2017)
- Award from the Academy of American Poets (2008)
