= The Chaos Machine =

2022 book by Max Fisher

The Chaos Machine: The Inside Story of How Social Media Rewired Our Minds and Our World
- Author: Max Fisher
- Language: English
- Publication date: 2022
- Publication place: United States
- Media type: Print

The Chaos Machine: The Inside Story of How Social Media Rewired Our Minds and Our World is a 2022 book by New York Times reporter Max Fisher, which explores how social media algorithms, designed to exploit human psychology and maximize engagement, have led to global polarization, misinformation, and violence.
