= The Heat Will Kill You First =

2023 book by Jeff Goodell

- Author: Jeff Goodell
- Language: English
- Publisher: Little, Brown, and Company
- Publication date: 2023
- Publication place: United States
- Pages: 400
- ISBN: 978-0316497572

The Heat Will Kill You First: Life and Death on a Scorched Planet is a 2023 book by environmental journalist Jeff Goodell that is published by Little, Brown, and Company. The book details the dangers to the environment from rising global temperatures due to global warming, particularly the devastating effects on human health.

== Narrative ==
In the book, Goodell criticizes use of the term global warming because it fails to convey the urgency associated with the climate crisis. Goodell decried the term global warming as sounding "gentle and soothing, as if the most notable impact of burning fossil fuels will be better beach weather". Goodell supports naming heat waves (similarly to how many governments name hurricanes) in order to convey to the public that the occurrences may be momentous and deadly.

The book details how heat waves caused by global warming have had disastrous effects on society including the 2003 European heat wave that killed 72,000 people, including 15,000 people in Paris alone. The author explains that the city of Paris developed during a more temperate time, and as the planet warmed in the late twentieth and twenty-first centuries, the city, with its famous tin roofs and other features, was poorly suited to such sweltering temperatures. The author also details the 2021 Western North American heat wave in which 1400 people died, including 600 people dying in British Columbia, Canada, a region that is usually temperate. That heat wave also lead to the destruction of the town of Lytton, British Columbia as the urban area and local ecosystem were ill-prepared for such extreme temperatures. Massive losses of wildlife occurred as well.

Throughout the book Goodell describes the deleterious effects of extreme heat, both on societies and the environment, as he travels to or reports about Baffin Island in the Canadian Arctic Circle, Antarctica, the Great Barrier Reef, Chennai, India (which at the time was struggling with critical water shortages), the tropics, and various cities. Goodell reported from the American Southwest as he went for a grueling one-day hike in the Sonoran Desert (a desert on the Mexico-United States Border in which thousands of migrants have died while trying to make an arduous five-to-six-day long crossing).

Goodell dedicates some of the book to discussing air conditioning and how this technology has allowed people to live in hotter climates but also has become a major contributor to global warming. Goodell explains how societies have become over-reliant on air conditioning, with 20% of all total electricity used by buildings coming from the units and he notes that the number of air conditioning units worldwide is expected to skyrocket from 1 billion in 2023 to more than 4.5 billion units by 2050. Goodell explains how this vicious cycle of reliance on air conditioning contributes to global warming: as the planet warms due to global warming caused by the use of fossil fuels, air conditioning becomes a necessity, allowing people to live in or migrate to extremely warm climates. But as the use of air conditioning grows exponentially as more people have access to the technology and are exposed to extreme heat facilitating increased use, so does its contribution to global warming with increasing electricity use and greenhouse gas emissions. And as Goodell explains, as society has become more dependent on air conditioning, more climate-friendly and historically used building cooling practices such as improved airflow in buildings, thicker walls with better insulation, or heat reflective roofing have been de-prioritized.

The book also goes into intimate, tragic details of everyday people who died in extreme heat. It details the deaths of Jonathan Gerrish, Ellen Chung, their one-year-old baby, and the family dog. The couple were young and healthy, but as they went for a hike near their home in Mariposa, California they perished as temperatures rose to 109 degrees Fahrenheit (43 °C) on the trail. Goodell also details the death of Sebastian Perez, an undocumented worker who died during the 2021 Western North American heat wave as he was working in a field of shrubs during 107 °F (42 °C) temperatures. At the time of Perez's death, there were no regulations in place to protect migrant workers from extreme heat despite migrants having lobbied for such regulations. Local measures aimed at protecting workers from extreme heat did pass shortly after Perez's death, but as of 2023, there are no national federal laws in the United States concerning protecting workers from heat and dehydration.

== Reception ==
Writing for the New York Times, critic Jennifer Szalai stated that Goodell's straightforward, stripped-down style of writing is well suited to convey the urgency of global warming and the effect it has on human and environmental health. Szalai stated: "This is a propulsive book, one to be raced through; the planet is burning, and we are running out of time." Writing for the Washington Post, Shannon Osaka commended the author for his ability to vividly portray the deleterious effects of extreme heat on the human body and how swiftly this may lead to death, stating: "Goodell is at his most effective when he describes how heat affects the human body." Writing for The Guardian, Nina Lakhani commended Goodell for his incisive reporting, in which he detailed how racist policies or a lack of urgency in the United States disregarded the needs of many people of color such as migrants, farm workers, and other laborers.
