= William Lamson =

American artist

- Born: 1977 (age 48–49); Arlington, Virginia
- Known for: Installation art, performance Art
- Movement: Generative art

William Lamson (born 1977) is an American installation artist, performance artist, and generative artist. He was born in Arlington, Virginia, and currently lives and works in Brooklyn, New York. Within his artistic career, he works both in the natural world and in his studio. His playful interaction with his environment includes small performances and actions that are captured on video.

== Education ==
Lamson received his undergraduate education at Dartmouth College and graduated with his B.A. in 2000. Soon after, he went on to pursue his M.F.A. at Bard College, graduating in 2006.

== Career achievements ==
Over his career, Lamson's work has appeared in Artforum, frieze, The New York Times, the Los Angeles Times, The New Yorker, Harper's, and The Village Voice. Lamson was named a 2014 Guggenheim Fellow, a MacDowell Fellow, and received grants from the Shifting Foundation and the Experimental Television Center.

== Artistic process and technique ==
As an interdisciplinary artist, Lamson uses a wide range of mediums, including video, photography, performance, and sculpture. In many of his projects, he creates an apparatus or props for the actions within the projects, as well as a set of tools for filming the action too. Despite significant logistical challenges, Lamson says the benefit of working this way is that he knows how everything works once they're ready to shoot the video. He builds the props and tools, and operates the camera himself, and budgets multiple days for careful shooting with only one or two assistants. Lamson's thoughtfulness when it comes to the viewer's experience and the function of the camera makes an impact in his work that shows through.

Set in landscapes as varied as New York's East River and Chile's Atacama Desert, his projects reveal the invisible systems and forces at play within these sites. In all his projects, Lamson's work represents a collaboration with forces outside of his control to explore systems of knowledge and belief.

In an interview with Dina Deitsch, a curator, Lamson said that his work is perhaps "a move from performing in front of the camera to performing inside of the image-making system itself."

== Exhibitions ==
Lamson's work has been exhibited widely in the United States and Europe. He's been exhibited in the Brooklyn Museum, The Moscow Biennial, P.S.1 MOMA, Kunsthalle Erfurt, the Museum of Contemporary Art in Denver, and Honor Fraser Gallery in Los Angeles. In addition, he has produced site-specific installations for the Indianapolis Museum of Art, the Center For Land Use Interpretation, and Storm King Art Center. His work is in the collections of the Brooklyn Museum, the Dallas Museum of Art, the Indianapolis Museum of Art, the Museum of Fine Arts in Houston, and a number of private collections.

== Work ==
=== Automatic (2009) ===
Lamson's work, Automatic (2009), is composed of 3 parts, each harnessing either the forces of wind or the sea. He does so by constructing kinetic contraptions that enlist those natural forces to generate pencil or black-pen drawings. Along with the resulting drawings, a video documents the movement of each apparatus responding to their landscape. Together, Sea Drawings, Kite Drawings, and the resulting 7:41 minute video makes up the project Automatic.

Lamson records each drawing's creation date, location, and duration of the work's making, in addition to the volume of water in the bottles, as though Lamson were conducting a physics experiment, where exact data is crucial. The precision in his process and documentation suggesting the precariousness of these contraptions, the meticulousness needed to produce a satisfactory outcome.

Molino Drawing captured the power of the wind by harnessing the movement of a wind turbine. A string connects a graphite pencil to a moving component of the turbine.

Kite Drawing also harnessed the power of the wind through the use of a kite. For this drawing, a marker is attached to a water bottle, which acts a weight for the marker. The kite's string is threaded through a rough wooden tripod, which acts as an anchor for the setup, so that when the wind blew the kite, the marker is moved across sheets of paper taped to a board underneath the setup. The results yielded an expressive pencil or black-pen drawings. Lamson channels nature's indeterminacy, offering the absurd yet fantastical suggestion that the wind is able to draw.

Sea Drawings were created in Coliumo, Chile on a cliff side overlooking the Pacific Ocean. Lamson created these drawings by harnessing the power of the sea below, capturing the energy in the rise and fall of waves. To do so there is a water bottle hanging down the side of the cliff being lifted up and down by the swells in waves, this, in turn, interacts with a pulley system of sorts connected to a graphite pencil. Close-ups of the apparatus in action show that the pencil's movements appear oddly purposeful, as if a consciousness were driving the mark-making; but in shots from afar, the mechanical process is clear.

=== A Line Describing the Sun (2010) ===
A Line Describing the Sun, 2010

His work A Line Describing the Sun (2010) is a two-channel video that documents Lamson melting the desert floor with a Fresnel lens into a line of black glass. He follows the path of the sun moves through the sky, hence the chosen title. With the help of a single assistant, the filming process involved performing this event over five days, capturing everything from wide high-angle shots to macro shots of the melting earth.

=== Solarium (2012) ===
In the site-specific installation structure Solarium (2012), was located at the Storm King Art Center in Mountainville, New York. The installation structure with three species of citrus trees grown inside. The 82 sq ft experimental structure is a functional greenhouse constructed of a steel frame and panels of caramelized sugar. To create the panels in an "amazing spectrum" of hues, Lamson concocted recipes he made himself, simply boiling refined white sugar until it turned specific shades. The resulting shades vary from clear to opaque black, with saffron, flame orange, primrose, and deep burgundy in between.

Lamson believes that when you approach Solarium up Storm King's grassy hill, you experience the Andrew Wyeth sensibility of "the sanctuary in the landscape." From the outside the structure gives the impression of a chapel of stained glass, and once they are inside, the viewer is able to understand the color of the panels better. These panels also create a colorized frame through which to view the landscape. There is a shifting experience between the unique color and texture of panels themselves as they age and change in the sun.

The structure is centered on a miniature lemon and orange trees symbolizing his interest in sugar as a fundamental requirement for life. All plants create sugars through photosynthesis. Lamson was interested in how the red-yellow light coming through the caramelized panels would affect the plants themselves and wanted to see if they would one day bear fruit. This possibility suggested a recursive materiality at play between the color of the light and the color of the fruit that the trees might produce.

=== Untitled (Walden) (2015) ===
The group exhibition Walden, revisited (2015) was a curation of fifteen projects by Dina Deitsch at the deCordova Sculpture Museum and Sculpture Park, a contemporary art museum in Lincoln, Massachusetts. Lamson's piece, Untitled (Walden) is both an installation piece as well as a video. The project is a poetic re-envisioning of the iconic cabin and watery landscape of Henry Thoreau's book Walden.

The Walden Pond is largely influenced by Henry Thoreau's naturalist and philosophical writings. Walden, published in 1854, is a book that details his deliberate escape into the woods to live a life simplified to "only the essential facts" in the now-iconic, self-built, one-room cabin on the shores of the pond. The book infused nature writing with the philosophical underpinnings of Transcendentalism, exalting self-reliance and direct experience of nature as the very marrow of existence. The Walden, revisited exhibition sets out to examine the complicated and evolving legacy of the book against Walden Pond's current landscape, today a state park and popular swimming hole.

To create the video, Lamson built a small-scale model of Thoreau's cabin re-imagined as an artist studio and entirely in white. The model floated on the lake inside of an eight-by-eight-foot cabin-shaped tent that functioned as a camera obscura. The resulting video captures the projected image of the inverted lake landscape as it moves slowly over the interior of the model cabin, illuminating the walls, furniture, and tools within this constructed space.

Lamson's sensitivity to the environmental conditions is critical to how his performative action unfolds and how his video work eventually comes together. The landscape operates as both the subject matter and a set of changing physical parameters that affect how he, the artist, responds to it.

The installation experience is a darkened space where the video is projected across the back wall of the gallery. The video is clips of the camera obscura phenomena in motion. Instead of the viewers seeing the floating cabin on Walden's pond from the shoreline, the camera obscura documentation creates a compression of time, space, and multiple perspectives of the landscape all within the eighteen-minute duration of the piece.
