= Karen Hao =

American journalist and data scientist

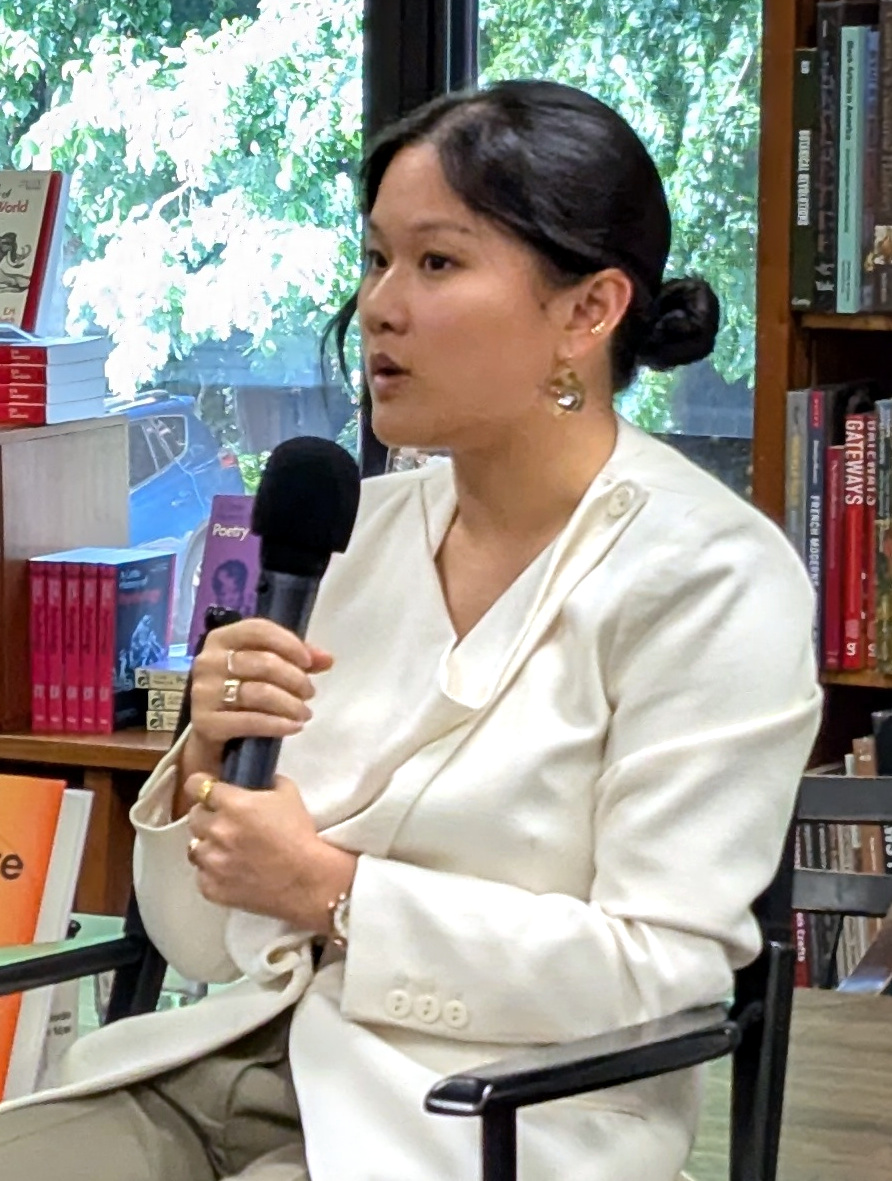
- Hao giving a talk at Politics and Prose in 2025
- Education: Massachusetts Institute of Technology (BS)
- Occupations: Journalist; engineer
- Notable credit(s): The Atlantic (2023–2024); The Wall Street Journal (2022–2023); MIT Technology Review (2018–2022); Quartz (2017–2018)
- Awards: Helen Bernstein Book Award for Excellence in Journalism (2026)
- Website: karendhao.com

Karen Hao
- Simplified Chinese: 郝珂灵
Transcriptions
Standard Mandarin
- Hanyu Pinyin: Hǎo Kēlíng

Karen Hao (born c. 1993) is an American journalist and author. She is currently a freelance reporter and previously worked as a foreign correspondent based in Hong Kong for The Wall Street Journal and senior artificial intelligence editor at the MIT Technology Review. She has written extensively on topics including AI research, technology ethics, and the social impact of AI. Hao also co-produced the podcast In Machines We Trust and wrote the newsletter The Algorithm.

Previously, she worked at Quartz as a tech reporter and data scientist and was an application engineer at the first startup to spin out of X Development. Hao's writing has also appeared in Mother Jones, Sierra Magazine, The New Republic, and other publications.

== Early life and education ==
Born in the United States, Hao is the daughter of Chinese immigrant parents, and grew up in New Jersey. She is a native speaker of both English and Mandarin Chinese. She graduated from The Lawrenceville School in 2011. She then studied at the Massachusetts Institute of Technology (MIT), graduating with a B.S. in mechanical engineering and a minor in energy studies in 2015.

== Career ==
Hao’s writing has spanned research and issues regarding big tech data privacy, misinformation, deepfakes, facial recognition, and AI healthcare tools.

In March 2021, Hao published a piece that uncovered previously unknown information about how attempts to combat misinformation by different teams at Facebook using machine learning were impeded and constantly at odds with Facebook's drive to grow user engagement. Upon its release, leaders at Facebook including Mike Schroepfer and Yann LeCun immediately criticized the piece through Twitter responses. AI researchers and AI ethics experts Timnit Gebru and Margaret Mitchell responded in support of Hao's writing and advocated for more change and improvement for all.

Hao also co-produced the podcast In Machines We Trust, which discusses the rise of AI with people developing, researching, and using AI technologies. The podcast won the 2020 Front Page Award in investigative reporting.

Hao has occasionally created data visualizations that have been featured in her work at the MIT Technology Review and elsewhere. In 2018, her "What is AI?" flowchart visualization was exhibited as an installation at the Museum of Applied Arts in Vienna.

She has been an invited speaker at TEDxGateway, the United Nations Foundation, EmTech, WNPR, and many other conferences and podcasts. Her TEDx talk discussed the importance of democratizing how AI is built.

In March 2022, she was hired by The Wall Street Journal to cover China technology and society, while being based in Hong Kong. She left the WSJ in 2023.

In May 2025, Hao released the book Empire of AI: Dreams and Nightmares in Sam Altman's OpenAI. The book became a New York Times Bestseller and was named a Book of the Year by the Financial Times. In December 2025, after criticism from readers, Hao issued a correction to her book where she had previously overestimated the water consumption of a data center in Chile compared to the community's water consumption by factor of 1,000, due to an error in a government document. In April 2026 the book won the New York Public Library's Helen Bernstein Book Award for Excellence in Journalism.

=== Selected awards and honors ===
- 2019 Webby Award nominee for best newsletter, as a writer of The Algorithm
- 2021 Front Page Award in investigative reporting, as a co-producer for In Machines We Trust
- 2021 Ambies Award nominee for best knowledge and science podcast, as a co-producer for In Machines We Trust
- 2021 Webby Award nominee for best technology podcast, as a co-producer for In Machines We Trust
- 2024 American Humanist Media Award
- 2025 TIME100 AI, named by TIME magazine as one of the 100 most influential people in artificial intelligence
- 2026 New York Public Library's Helen Bernstein Book Award for Excellence in Journalism
- 2026 Whiting Award in Non-fiction
