= There Are No Children Here =

1992 book by Alex Kotlowitz

There Are No Children Here: The Story of Two Boys Growing Up in the Other America
- Author: Alex Kotlowitz
- Language: English
- Genre: Biography, Non-fiction
- Publisher: Doubleday
- Publication date: 1992
- Publication place: United States
- Awards: The Helen Bernstein Award for Excellence in Journalism, The Christopher Award, The Carl Sandburg Award

There Are No Children Here: The Story of Two Boys Growing Up in the Other America is a 1992 biography by Alex Kotlowitz that describes the experiences of two brothers growing up in Chicago's Henry Horner Homes. It won the Carl Sandburg award.

== Overview ==
=== Rivers family structure ===
The Rivers brothers, like many in the Henry Horner Homes, live with their mother, LaJoe. The boys' father, Paul, drifts in and out of the apartment; however, his income mostly supports his drug habit and alcoholism. Together, they have eight children, their first being born when LaJoe was 14.

- LaShawn, the oldest, who financially supports her drug addiction with prostitution.
- Paul, (named after his father) the oldest boy, also called Weasel.
- Terence, Lafeyette and Pharoah's favorite brother. Terence often supports his little brothers with advice to stay away from gangs and drugs. Terence, however, winds up in prison by 1990, for his involvement in two robberies; the book claims he only participated in one, but was convicted of both.
- Lafeyette, who is the most dependable child, helps his mother care for the younger children. He and Lajoe have an exceptional bond, one LaJoe originally found in Terence. Terence faded from his mother, and lost his bond with her; LaJoe worries the same may happen between her and Lafeyette. Much of her story revolves around her work to salvage and sustain their relationship.
- Pharoah, the most precocious boy, who finds solace in literature and spelling. An extremely sensitive and reflective child, Pharoah often shields himself from his unstable environment by refusing to acknowledge it. Pharoah is by far the most successful student of the children; he participated in spelling bees and is honored with multiple awards. He develops a stutter, which he spends most of his time trying to defeat, due to his stress.
- The triplets, Timothy, Tammie, and Tiffanie, who are only four at the beginning of the book.

LaShawn and Weasel (the oldest son) are not close with the other children (despite living with them), and are mentioned very little in the book. The triplets occupy most of Lafeyette's time, as he watches out for them when his mother does not. Though most members of the family are close, they each have different ways of expressing their love.

== Themes ==
The story presents a dark part of American society. The story mentions that children as young as thirteen years old are already engaged in violence, gang membership, and drug dealing. There are several points that are useful in understanding the social context of the urban youth in American society.

First, the story explores the causes of domestic violence. Kotlowitz points out that the young people are robbed of their innocence by their dysfunctional social environments. Their attitudes are molded by the violence that they encounter day to day and the kind of life they are born into in the projects. Any fear of committing violent actions is replaced by their desire to maintain their own safety and fulfill their own needs.

Secondly, the story presents the idea that the children could succeed if given a chance. Pharoah exemplifies this by excelling when given the chance to study.

The story also reveals gross violations of human rights, depriving most of the youths of chances of successful futures. The city officials who are supposed to maintain peace and order as well as look after the welfare of the people in the project are the ones who corrupted the budget intended for the betterment of the building occupants. The Chicago Housing Authority personnel are depicted as largely responsible for the horrendous living conditions in the housing project, particularly in the Rivers' building.

== Research and writing process ==
Kotlowitz spent three years with Lafeyette and Pharoah and their family and friends. Through numerous interviews, discussion, and reflections he compiled, There Are No Children Here brings the different views, worries, and opinions from the members of the Rivers family. There Are No Children Here is a combination of reporting, urban nonfiction, and biographical writing.

=== Title ===
The title comes from a quote by LaJoe Rivers commenting on the bleakness of her children's livelihood.

But you know, there are no children here. They've seen too much to be children.

- LaJoe Rivers, 1988

== Awards ==
The book won the Helen Bernstein Book Award for Excellence in Journalism, the Christopher Award, and the Carl Sandburg Award.

== Adaptation ==
In 1993, the book was adapted into a television film of the same name starring Oprah Winfrey as LaJoe, Keith David, and Maya Angelou in a performance "that crackles with power."
