= The Watchers: The Rise of America's Surveillance State =

2010 book by Shane Harris

- Author: Shane Harris
- Language: English
- Media type: Print (hardback & paperback)

The Watchers: The Rise of America's Surveillance State is a non-fiction book by American journalist Shane Harris, published in 2010. It details the rise of surveillance programs in the U.S. Author Harris had previously served as a writer for outfits such as Foreign Policy, National Journal, and The Washingtonian.

The book has received critical praise from various reviews, with Booklist commenting that "Harris sifts through a confusing array of acronyms, fascinating characters, and chilling operations to offer an absorbing look at modern spying technology and how it impacts average Americans". As well, Publishers Weekly described the book as having an "informative and dramatic narrative". Alexandra Silver of Time remarked that the book "reads like a spy novel".

Beyond its stylistic appeal, critics have highlighted the work's historical depth; The New York Times noted that Harris effectively traces the evolution of the surveillance state from its Cold War roots to the post-9/11 era.^([4]) Writing for The Washington Post, Barton Gellman praised Harris's ability to demystify complex technical subjects, stating that the book serves as an essential primer for understanding the "invisible infrastructure" of domestic intelligence.^([5])

Harris writes that mass surveillance in the U.S. accelerated due to the aftermath of the September 11th attacks, while the impetus behind it goes back decades to the Reagan Administration. Then, as Harris recounts, the National Security Agency's Director, Michael Hayden, spearheads a successful secret campaign to persuade the rest of the Bush administration to expand the efforts made previously under the Total Information Awareness (TIA) program. The NSA organizes a massive undertaking to sort through the vast data cloud of e-mails, phone calls, and the like that it can collect; its work expands and expands over the years.

== Background and contents ==
Harris has worked as a writer for the publications Foreign Policy, National Journal, and The Washingtonian, discussing issues such as government intelligence and cyber-security.

Harris traces back modern counter-terrorist efforts through surveillance to the reaction to the 1983 Beirut barracks bombing, in which U.S. intelligence networks failed to piece together the numerous clues about militant activity against Americans inside the Lebanese Civil War. Facing the sudden challenge of suicide bombings and threats of more attacks, the administration of President Ronald Reagan adopted a war-centered posture against militant groups, trying to re-organize the U.S. federal government upon the task, such as by tracking down and then freezing terrorist assets. The terminology of a 'war on terrorism' becomes used for about for the first time.

Shocked by the death of a full 241 Marines in the aforementioned attack, John Poindexter, then President Reagan's National Security Advisor, comes up with a grand vision of collecting real-time intelligence data in a massive federal government system. Despite his skill in both technical know-how as well as managing state funds, his reach exceeds his grasp. Still, even decades later with Poindexter's reputation tainted due to his role in the Iran-Contra Scandal, other Washington insiders have the same dream.

Harris also details how the advance of the digital age put the National Security Agency (NSA) at a crossroads, with past tactics such as direct tapping of phone lines becoming a thing of the past. Still, though the U.S. become more and more important as a global tele-communications hub for the rest of the world, U.S. law strictly put limits on domestic spying by agencies such as the NSA meant to look outward. He states that while nobody in the intelligence service that he looked at had any ill intentions or felt dismissive of privacy concerns, they still operated in a world where their bureaucracies' actions snowballed.

As stated before, he writes that mass surveillance in the U.S. accelerated due to the aftermath of the September 11th attacks. The NSA's Director, Michael Hayden, spearheads a successful secret campaign to persuade the rest of the Bush administration to expand the efforts made previously under the Total Information Awareness (TIA) program, which itself ended in 2003 due to Congressional opposition. Hadyen and his allies take a widely expansive interpretation of the law around executive branch authority. As Harris details, the NSA organizes its own internal efforts to sort through the vast data cloud of e-mails, phone calls, and the like that become codified and bureaucratized as the years go on.

== Reviews and reception ==
Booklist gave the work critical praise, stating that "Harris sifts through a confusing array of acronyms, fascinating characters, and chilling operations to offer an absorbing look at modern spying technology and how it impacts average Americans." Also, Publishers Weekly remarked that "Harris carefully examines how the nexus between terrorism and technology" and lauded the book's "informative and dramatic narrative". Alexandra Silver of Time remarked that the book "reads like a spy novel".

The publication Library Journal called the book "controversial" and "important" while also comparing it to the fictional thriller The Bell Ringers.

== See also ==
- 2010 in literature
- John Poindexter
- Mass surveillance in the United States
- National Security Agency
  - NSA electronic surveillance program
- Stellar Wind (code name)
- Total Information Awareness (TIA)
