= Alex Kotlowitz =

American journalist, author, and filmmaker (born 1955)

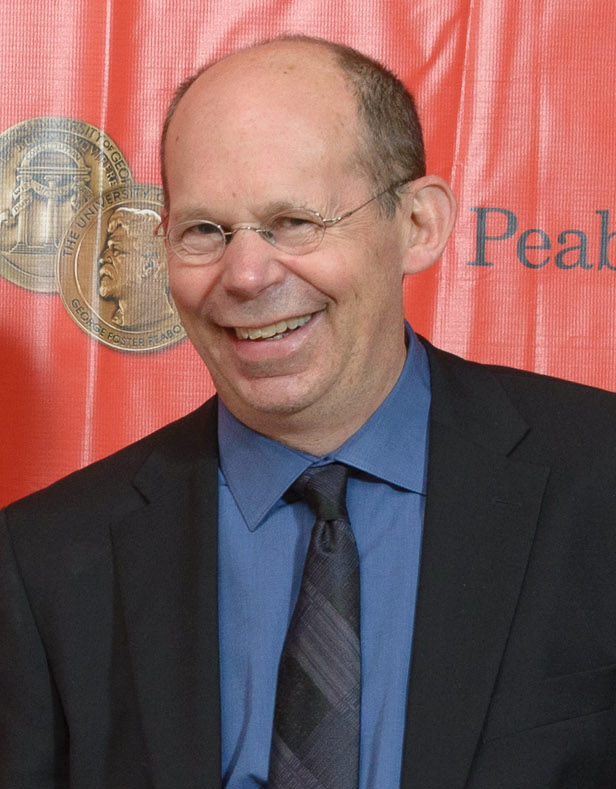
Alex Kotlowitz at the 73rd Annual Peabody Awards

Alex Kotlowitz (born March 31, 1955) is an American journalist, author, and filmmaker. His 1991 book There Are No Children Here was a national bestseller and received the Christopher Award and Helen Bernstein Award. He is a two-time recipient of both the Peabody Award and the Dupont Award for journalism. He co-produced the 2011 documentary The Interrupters, based on his New York Times Magazine article, which received an Independent Spirit Award and Emmy Award.

== Biography ==
Kotlowitz was raised in New York City, the son of former New York public television executive and former Harper's Magazine editor Robert Kotlowitz. Kotlowitz received his undergraduate degree from Wesleyan University and is an alumnus of the Ragdale Foundation. His first journalism job was at a small alternative weekly in Lansing, Michigan. He currently lives in Chicago with his wife and two children.

== Writing ==
Kotlowitz is the author of four books, including An American Summer, which was awarded the J. Anthony Lukas Book Prize.

Kotlowitz is also the author of There Are No Children Here: The Story of Two Boys Growing Up in the Other America, The Other Side of the River: A Story of Two Towns, a Death and America's Dilemma and Never a City So Real, among other works. There Are No Children Here, a national bestseller, is the winner of the Carl Sandburg Award, a Christopher Award, and the Helen B. Bernstein Award for Excellence in Journalism. The New York Public Library selected this work as one of the 150 most important books of the twentieth century. In 1993, it was adapted as a television movie produced by and starring Oprah Winfrey. The Other Side of the River received the Heartland Prize for Nonfiction.

Kotlowitz, a Wall Street Journal staff writer from 1984 to 1993, has contributed to The New York Times Magazine, The New Yorker, and This American Life. His articles have also appeared in Granta, The Washington Post, The Chicago Tribune, Rolling Stone, The Atlantic and The New Republic. His work has also been included in numerous anthologies—and on PBS's Frontline, NPR's All Things Considered and Morning Edition, and WBEZ. His 2016 podcast, Written Inside, a collection of essays by inmates at a maximum security prison, was picked as one of the top ten podcasts of the year by NPR's Lauren Ober. His play, An Unobstructed View (co-authored with Amy Drozdowska), premiered in Chicago in June 2005.

He has been awarded honors for his print and broadcast journalism, books, and films. His journalism honors include two Peabody Awards, two Columbia duPont Awards, an Emmy, the Robert F. Kennedy Journalism Award and the George Polk Award. In 2019, he received the Harold Washington Literary Award. He's been a Distinguished Visitor at the John D. and Catherine T. MacArthur Foundation, and is the recipient of John LaFarge Memorial Award for Interracial Justice given by New York's Catholic Interracial Council.

== Film ==
Kotlowitz's documentary The Interrupters, co-produced with filmmaker Steve James, debuted at the Sundance Film Festival in January 2011 to widespread critical acclaim. The project was inspired by Kotlowitz's 2008 New York Times Magazine article, "Blocking the Transmission of Violence." For the film, Kotlowitz and James received an Emmy, the Independent Spirit Award for Best Documentary Feature, and a Cinema Eye Award; it was selected by numerous publications, including The New Yorker and Entertainment Weekly, as one of the top ten films of 2011. In 2012, it aired on PBS's Frontline as a two-hour special.

== Academia ==
Kotlowitz is a professor at the Medill School of Journalism and has been a visiting professor at the University of Notre Dame and at Dartmouth College. He also has been a writer-in-residence at the University of Chicago. He is the recipient of eight honorary degrees.

== Bibliography ==
- There Are No Children Here: The Story of Two Boys Growing Up in the Other America. 1991. ISBN 978-0-30781-428-9.
- The Other Side of the River: A Story of Two Towns, a Death, and America's Dilemma. 1998. ISBN 978-0-30781-429-6
- Never a City So Real: A Walk in Chicago. 2004. ISBN 978-0-22661-901-9.
- "Khalid". Granta (108): 47–66. Autumn 2009.
- An American Summer: Love and Death in Chicago. 2019. ISBN 978-0-80417-091-8.
