= Douglas, Chicago =

Community area in Chicago, Illinois

Douglas
- Community area
- Community Area 35 - Douglas
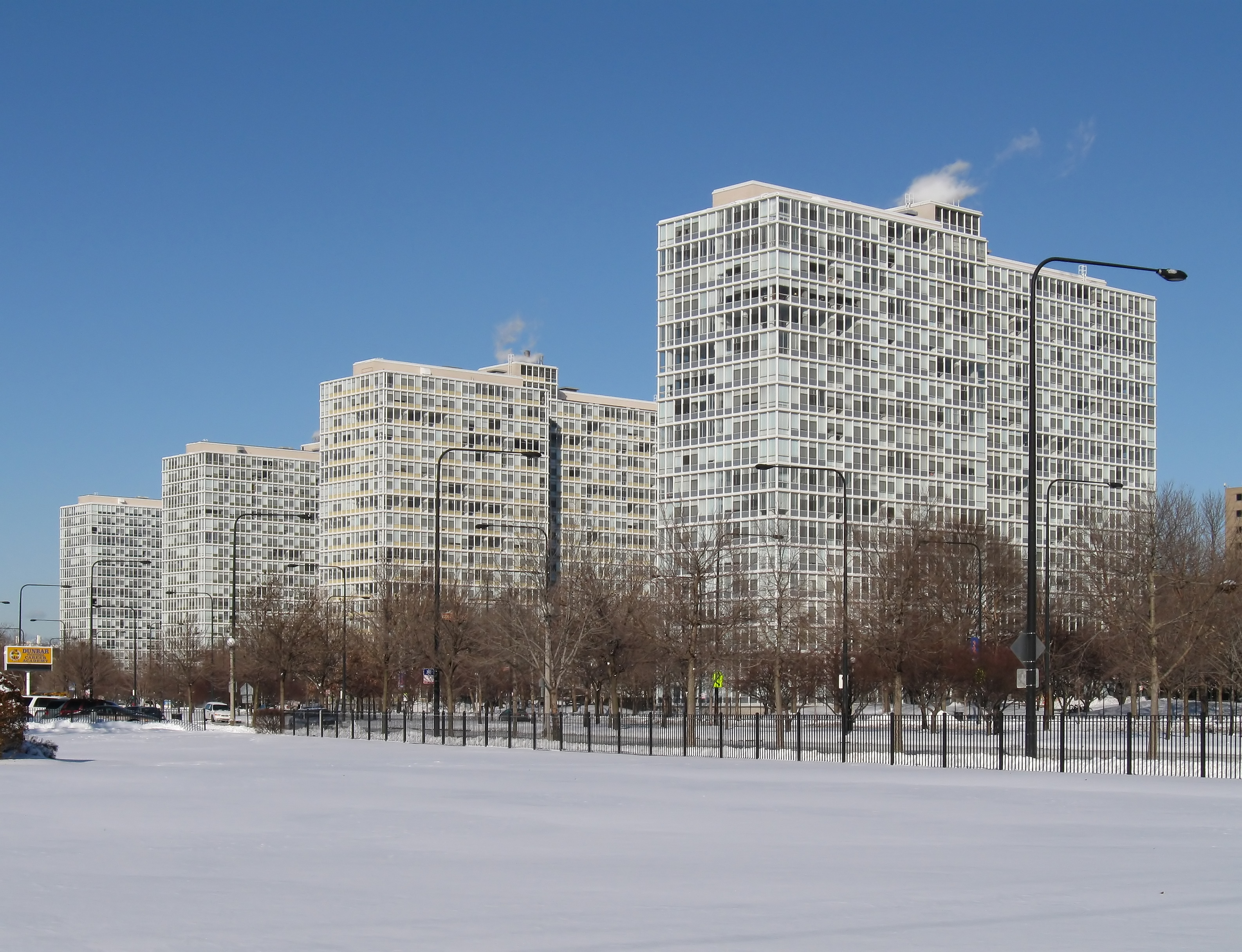
- Prairie Shores in Bronzeville

- Location within the city of Chicago
- Coordinates: 41°50′05″N 87°37′05″W
- Country: United States
- State: Illinois
- County: Cook
- City: Chicago
- Named for: Stephen A. Douglas

Area
  - Total: 1.67 sq mi (4.33 km^{2})
- Elevation: 597 ft (182 m)

Population (2024)
  - Total: 21,088
  - Density: 12,600/sq mi (4,870/km^{2})

Demographics 2024
  - White: 10.5 %
  - Black: 64.1%
  - Hispanic: 7.8%
  - Asian: 12.9%
  - Other: 4.7%
- Time zone: UTC-6 (CST)
  - Summer (DST): UTC-5 (CDT)
- ZIP Codes: parts of 60609, 60616 and 60653
- Median household income 2023: $44,426
- Source: U.S. Census, Record Information Services

Douglas is one of the 77 community areas of Chicago in Illinois, United States, located on the South Side of Chicago.

The Douglas community area stretches from 26th Street, south to Pershing Road along the Lake Shore, including parts of the Green Line, along State Street and the Metra Electric and Amtrak passenger railroad tracks, which run parallel to Lake Shore Drive. Burnham Park runs along its shoreline, containing 31st Street Beach. The community area also contains part of the neighborhood of Bronzeville, the historic center of black culture in the city, since the early 20th century and the Great Migration.

The neighborhood is named for Stephen A. Douglas, Illinois politician and Abraham Lincoln's political foe, whose estate included a tract of land given to the federal government. This tract later was developed for use as the Civil War Union training and prison camp, Camp Douglas, located in what is now the eastern portion of the Douglas neighborhood. Douglas gave that part of his estate at Cottage Grove and 35th to the Old University of Chicago. The Chicago 2016 Olympic bid planned for the Olympic Village to be constructed on a 37-acre (15 ha) truck parking lot, south of McCormick Place, that is mostly in the Douglas community area and partly in the Near South Side.

== Neighborhoods ==
=== Bronzeville ===
The Bronzeville neighborhood includes parts of the Douglas, Grand Boulevard, and Oakland community areas on the South Side of Chicago, around the Illinois Institute of Technology, VanderCook College of Music, and Illinois College of Optometry. It is generally considered to be bounded by Cermak Road (22nd Street) to the north, 60th Street to the south, Lake Michigan to the east, and the Dan Ryan Expressway to the west. Others consider its boundaries to be even wider.

Bronzeville is accessible via the Green and Red lines of the Chicago "L", as well as the Metra Electric District Main Line. In 2011, a new Metra station, 35th Street station, opened to serve the neighborhood on the Rock Island and proposed SouthEast Service. Bronzeville is located in Chicago's 3rd ward, currently represented by Alderman Pat Dowell.

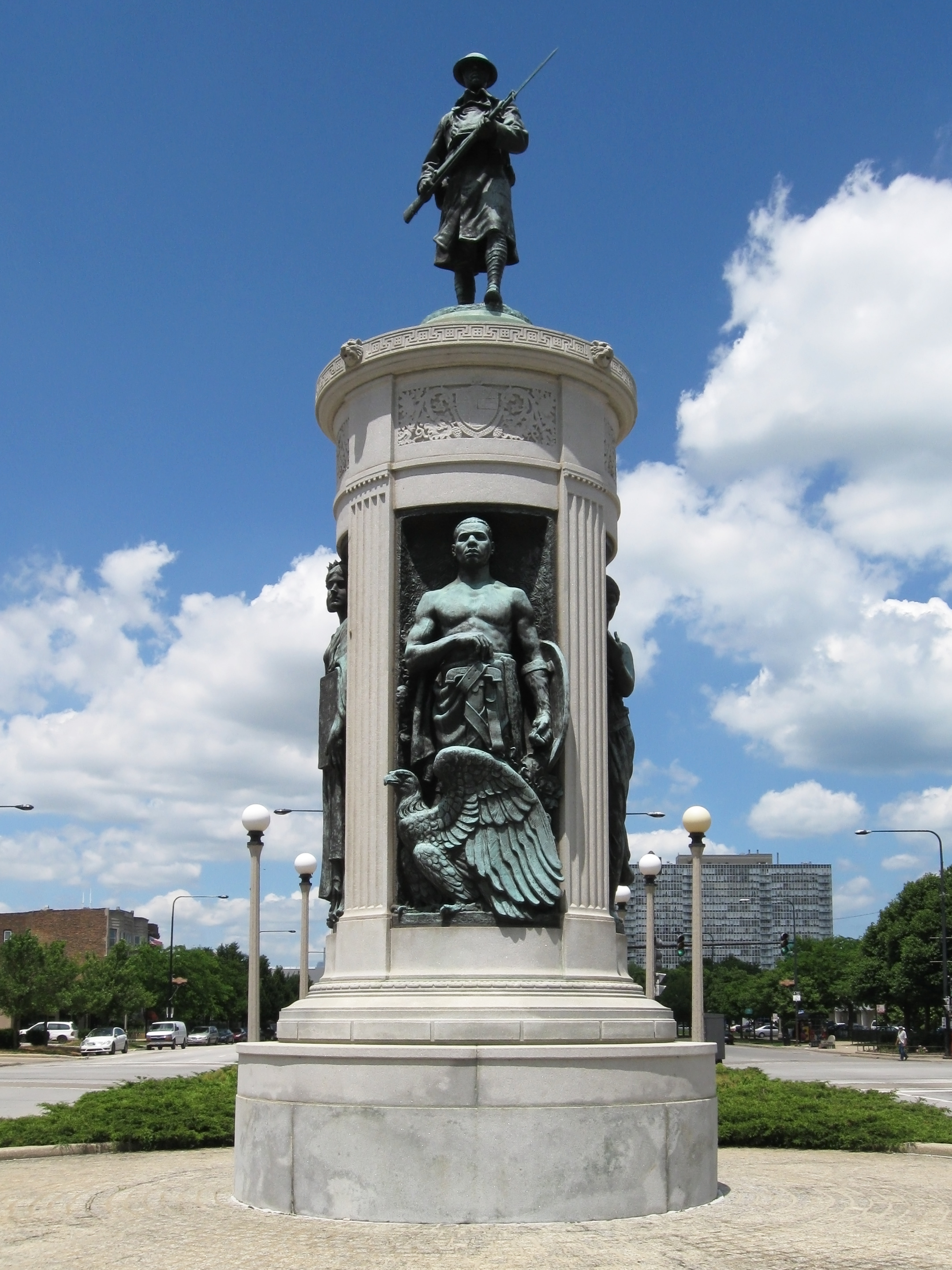
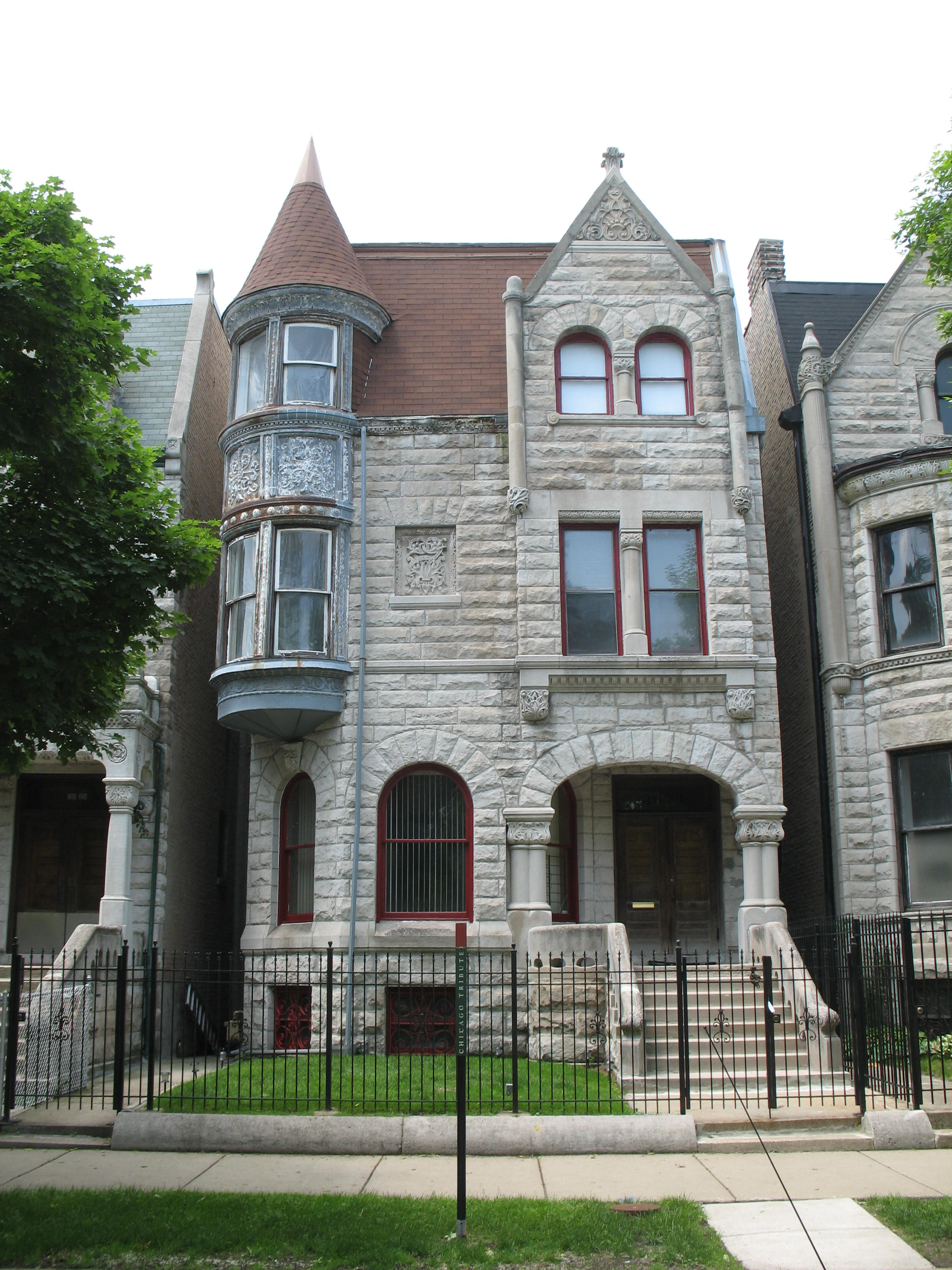
Victory Monument and the Ida B. Wells-Barnett House

In the early 20th century, Bronzeville was known as the "Black Metropolis", one of the nation's most significant concentrations of African-American businesses, and culture. The groundbreaking Pekin Theatre rose near 27th street in the first decade of the 20th century.

Between 1910 and 1920, during an early peak of the "Great Migration", the population of the area increased dramatically when thousands of black Americans escaped the de jure segregation and prejudice rife in the U.S. South and migrated to Chicago in search of industrial jobs. The Wabash YMCA is considered the first black Y in the U.S. It remains active today due to ongoing support from nearby black churches. The Wabash YMCA's work to commemorate black culture was the genesis of Black History Month.

In 1922, Louis B. Anderson, a Chicago alderman, had the architects Michaelsen & Rognstad build him a house at 3800 South Calumet Avenue. The surrounding area would take on the name of this house (which he had named Bronzeville).

Key figures in the area include: Andrew "Rube" Foster, founder of the Negro National Baseball League; Ida B. Wells, a civil rights activist, journalist and co-organizer of the NAACP; Margaret Taylor-Burroughs, artist, author, and one of the co-founders of the DuSable Museum of African American History; Bessie Coleman, the first black woman pilot; Gwendolyn Brooks, poet laureate and first black American awarded the Pulitzer Prize, as well as, other acclaimed authors and artists of the Chicago Black Renaissance; actresses Susie Garrett, Marla Gibbs and Jennifer Beals; acclaimed R&B singers Minnie Riperton, Sam Cooke and Lou Rawls; and cornet player and jazz bandleader King Oliver. His protégé, jazz musician, trumpeter and bandleader Louis Armstrong from New Orleans and his wife Lil Hardin Armstrong, who was a pianist, composer and bandleader, lived in Bronzeville on E. 44th Street and performed at many of the area's night clubs, including the Sunset Cafe and Dreamland Cafe.

External videos
- The 77: A City of Neighborhoods - Bronzeville, Choose Chicago

47th Street was and remains the hub of the Bronzeville neighborhood. In the early 21st century, it has started to regain some of its former glory. Gone for good is the Regal Theater (demolished in 1973), where many great performers took the stage. The Forum Hall building was built in 1897 designed by Chicago architect Samuel Atwater Treat (1839-1910) and may contain the oldest hardwood ballroom dance floor in Chicago. It filled a significant role in Bronzeville's cultural scene, being the venue for famous musicians. From the 1940s and 1960s, high-rise public housing projects were constructed in the area, which were managed by the Chicago Housing Authority. The largest complex was the Robert Taylor Homes. They developed severe social problems exacerbated by concentrated poverty among the residents and poor design of the buildings. This project was demolished in the late 1990s and early 21st century. The nickname "Bronzeville" was first used for the area in 1930 by James J. Gentry, a local theater editor for the Chicago Bee publication. It refers to the brown skin color of black Americans, who predominated as residents in that area. It has become common usage over decades.

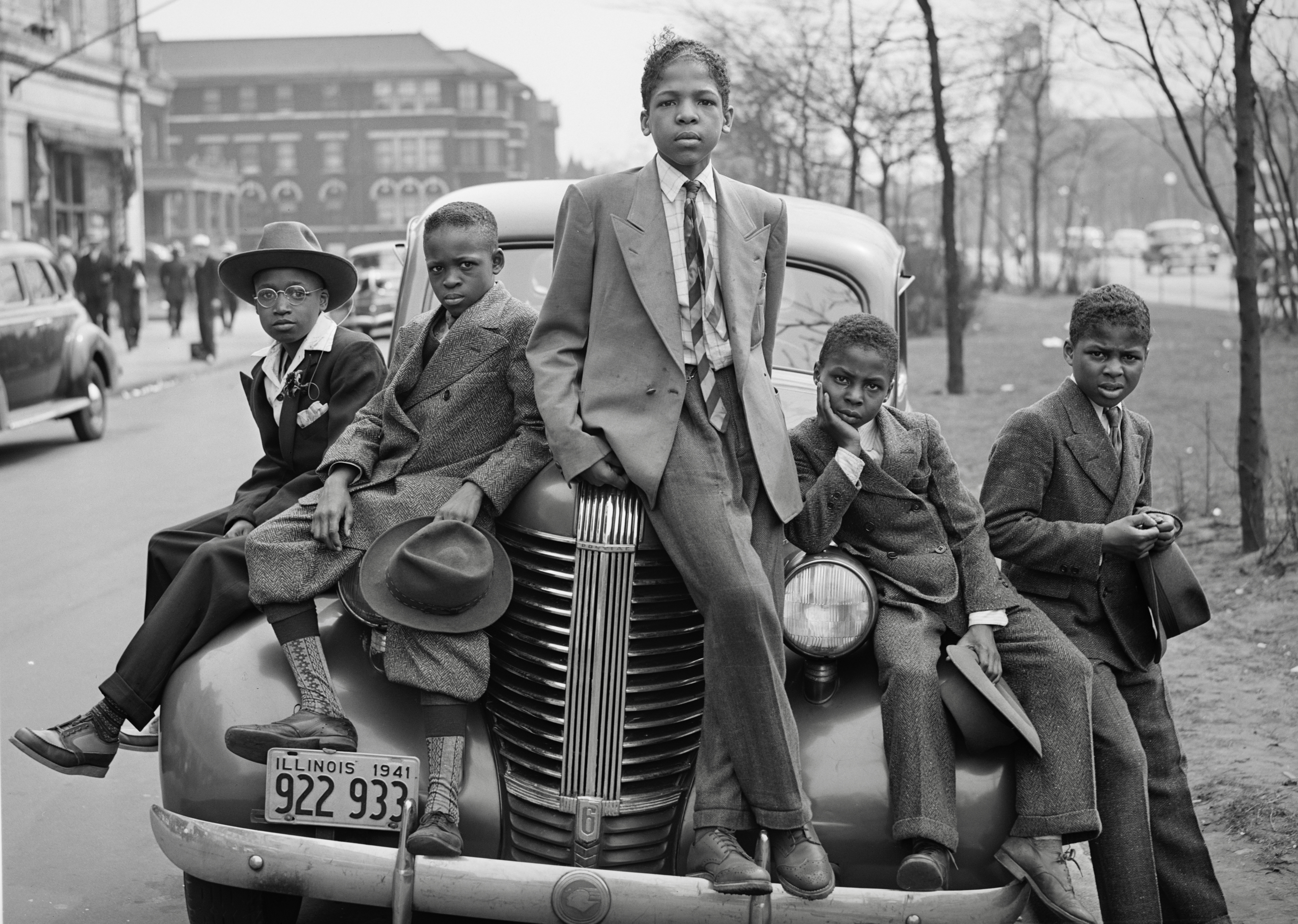
"Negro Boys, Easter Sunday," photographed in 1941 across from the Regal Theater in Bronzeville by FSA photographer Russell Lee, who was in Chicago documenting the Great Migration

The Bronzeville community features in various literary works set in Chicago, including Richard Wright's Native Son, Gwendolyn Brooks' A Street in Bronzeville, Lorraine Hansberry's stage play A Raisin in the Sun, Leon Forrest's There is a Tree More Ancient than Eden [The Bloodworth Trilogy], Bayo Ojikutu's crime novel 47th Street Black, and Sara Paretsky's detective mystery Blacklist, part of the V. I. Warshawski series.

Historical images of Bronzeville are in Explore Chicago Collections, a digital repository made available by Chicago Collections archives, libraries and other cultural institutions in the city. The neighborhood includes what has been designated as the Black Metropolis-Bronzeville District.

=== Prairie Shores ===
Originally a five-building, 1677-unit public housing project erected in 1962 by Michael Reese Hospital, Prairie Shores has been adapted as a market rate, middle-class community. Along with the adjacent Lake Meadows development, this was part of the city's largest urban renewal project at the time of its inception in 1946. The total project included construction of the Illinois Institute of Technology and Mercy Hospital. The development was funded under the Title I of the Housing Act of 1949, using US$6.2 million ($66 million today) of subsidies.

=== Groveland Park ===
Of all the sections of Douglas originally developed by Stephen A. Douglas, only Groveland Park survives. Its homes are built around an oval-shaped park. Groveland Park is located between Cottage Grove Avenue, 33rd Street, 35th Street and the Metra Electric District railroad tracks.

== Politics ==
The Douglas community area has supported the Democratic Party in the past two presidential elections. In the 2016 presidential election, the Douglas cast 6,342 votes for Hillary Clinton and cast 187 votes for Donald Trump (97.13% to 2.80%). In the 2012 presidential election, Douglas cast 8,206 votes for Barack Obama and cast 158 votes for Mitt Romney (98.11% to 1.88%).

== Transportation ==
The Metra Electric District has a flag stop at East 27th Street, where trains stop either at the request of a passenger on-board, or if riders are seen waiting on the platform. The CTA Green Line also serves the community area at the 35th station.

== Demographics ==
Historical population
Census	Pop.	Note	%±
1930	50,285		—
1940	53,124		5.6%
1950	78,745		48.2%
1960	52,325		−33.6%
1970	43,731		−16.4%
1980	35,700		−18.4%
1990	30,652		−14.1%
2000	26,470		−13.6%
2010	18,238		−31.1%
2020	20,291		11.3%

The population of Douglas climbed precipitously through the mid-20th century as a result of the Great Migration of black families to the North. At the time, African American families were primarily limited to an area known as the "Black Belt", which constitutes much of the area of historic Bronzeville. The rapid influx of new residents notoriously contributed to overcrowded and unsanitary conditions in the growing neighborhood.

Following its peak in 1950, the population of the neighborhood began a long decline as racial covenants restricting black settlement were lifted and black families sought residence in other areas. Economic decline in the 1960s and 1970s coinciding with disinvestment further contributed to the flight of families from the area. Furthermore, urban renewal projects led by the Chicago Housing Authority (CHA) contributed to the displacement of over 18,000 individuals from Bronzeville.

The turn of the 21st century saw the CHA enact its Plan for Transformation, resulting in the demolition of many of the public housing projects erected in the prior decades. Consequently, the population of the neighborhood plummeted at an even faster clip from 2000-2010, bottoming out at 18,238 residents. Beginning in the 1990s, however, Bronzeville and Douglas began to see renewed interest from middle- and upper-income black professionals attracted to its past. This trend has continued in recent times, with Douglas finally turning the corner on population growth in the 2020 census with an increase of 11.3% over the past decade.

Notably, researchers have identified that Bronzeville contains two of the 193 census tracts nationally that achieved a remarkable decrease in poverty with minimal displacement of the existing communities between 2000 and 2015. This trend has been attributed to the abundance of vacant lots throughout the neighborhood, which encourage development without driving out residents. Furthermore, commentators have noted that Bronzeville is unique among Chicago neighborhoods in that the majority of gentrification has been driven by the black middle class.

== Education ==
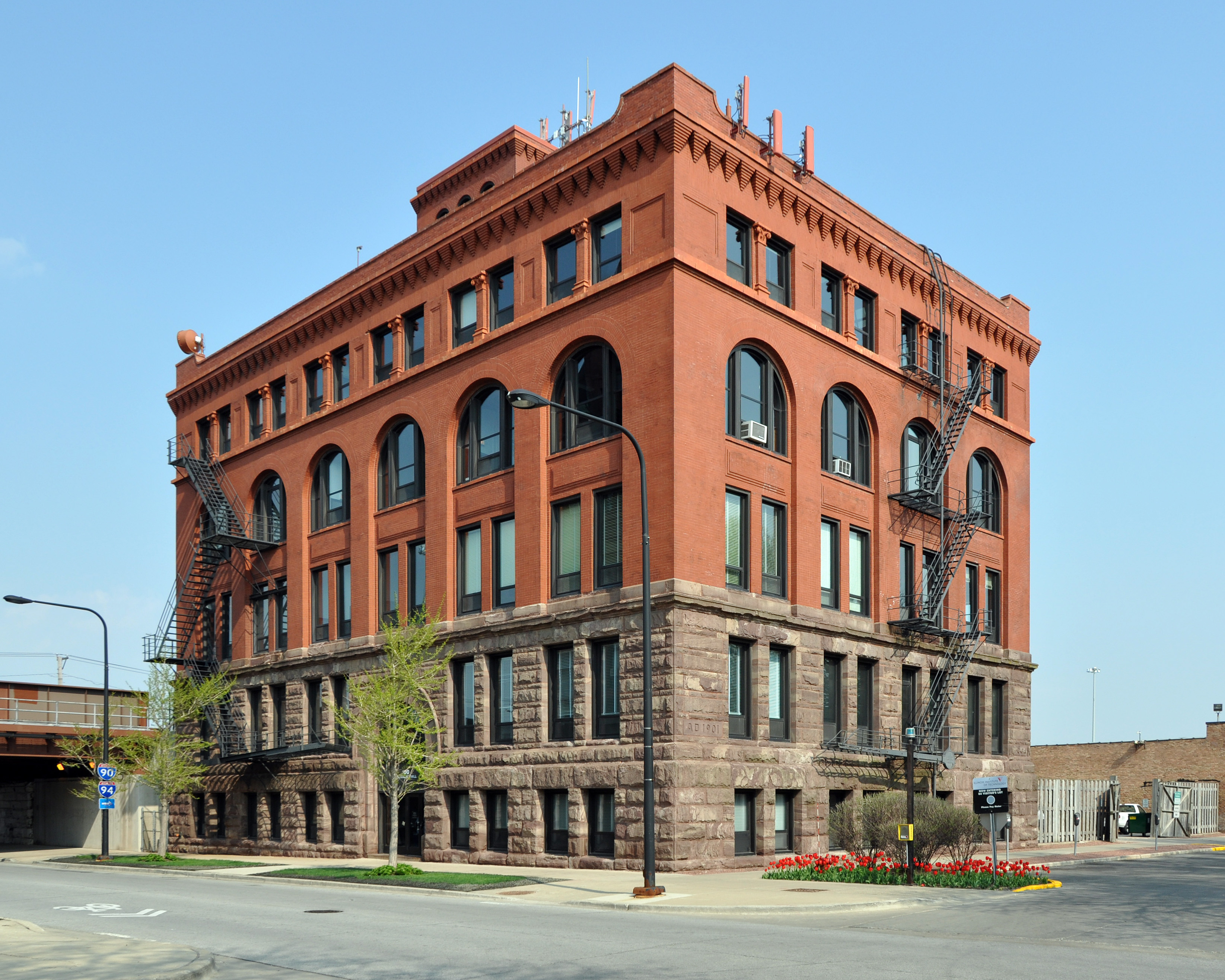
Several buildings on the Illinois Institute of Technology main campus, such as Machinery Hall pictured here, have been designated as Chicago Landmarks and placed on the National Register of Historic Places.

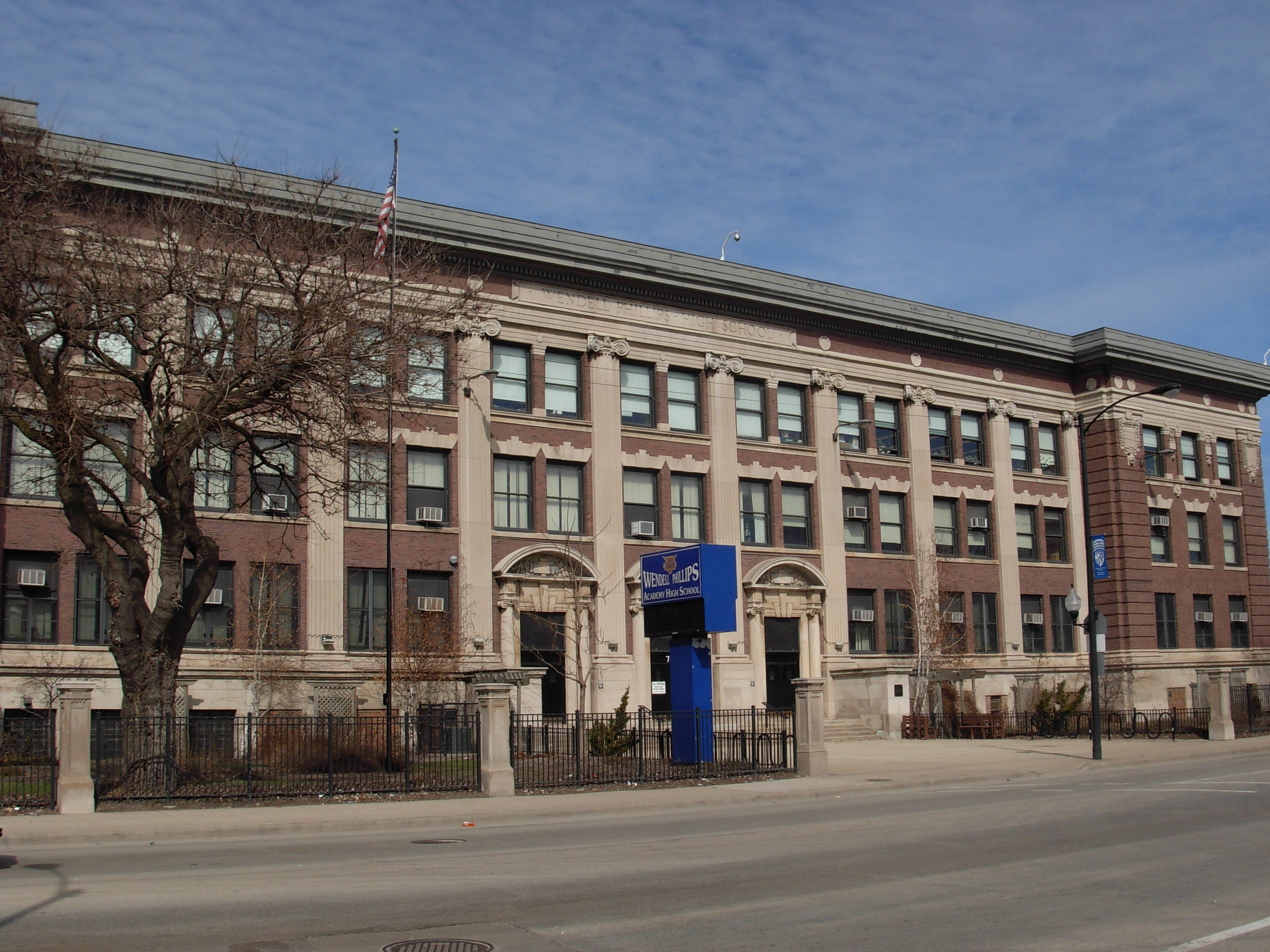
Phillips Academy High School

The following Chicago Public Schools campuses serve Bronzeville: Beethoven Elementary School, Phillips Academy High School, Dunbar Vocational High School, Bronzeville Scholastic Institute, Chicago Military Academy, and Walter H. Dyett High School. Notable private schools include De La Salle High School and Hales Franciscan High School.

Young Women's Leadership Charter School, a charter school, is in the community area.

Bronzeville is also home to the renowned Illinois Institute of Technology, which is famous for its engineering and architecture programs. It is home to the VanderCook College of Music and the Illinois College of Optometry. In 2006 the liberal arts school Shimer College, based on the Great Books, moved into the neighborhood.

== Notable residents ==
- Harold Washington (1922–1987), the 51st and First Black Mayor of Chicago from 1983–1987
- Ferdinand Lee Barnett (1852–1936), journalist, lawyer, and civil rights activist. He and his wife resided at 3624 South Martin Luther King Jr. Drive from 1919 to 1930.
- Quincy Jones (1933–2024), record producer, musician, and songwriter. At the time of the 1940 United States census, he resided with his family at 3548 South Prairie Avenue.
- R. Kelly (born 1967), singer, songwriter, record producer and convicted serial child sex abuser. He was a childhood resident of the Ida B. Wells Homes.
- Ronnie Lester (born 1959), University of Iowa All American, NBA Player for Chicago Bulls and Los Angeles Lakers. He was a childhood resident of Stateway Gardens, a public housing project operated by the Chicago Housing Authority.
- Arthur Wergs Mitchell (1883–1968), first black person elected as a Democrat to the United States House of Representatives. He resided at what is now 3637 S Dr Martin Luther King Jr Dr during his career representing Illinois's 1st congressional district.
- Lou Rawls (1933–2006), singer, songwriter, actor, and record producer. He was a childhood resident of the Ida B. Wells Homes.
- Martin Roche (1853–1927), architect whose works include the Marquette Building and the Gage Group Buildings. He resided at 3614 South Martin Luther King Drive.
- Marshall "Major" Taylor (1878–1932), professional cyclist and first African American to win a world championship for cycling. He resided at the Wabash Avenue YMCA for the final two years of his life.
- Norman Teague (born 1968), designer, artist, educator.
- Ida B. Wells (1862–1931), journalist and civil rights activist. She and her husband resided at 3624 South Martin Luther King Jr. Drive from 1919 to 1930.
- Katie Got Bandz (born 1993), rapper, songwriter.
- Pope Leo XIV (born 1955), the 267th Pope of the Roman Catholic Church and sovereign of the Vatican City State. He was born in Bronzeville, Chicago.

== See also ==
- Black Metropolis
