= V.I. Warshawski (film) =

- Film poster
- Directed by: Jeff Kanew
- Screenplay by: Edward Taylor; David Aaron Cohen; Nick Thiel
- Based on: Deadlock by Sara Paretsky
- Produced by: Penney Finkelman Cox; Jeffrey Lurie
- Starring: Kathleen Turner; Jay O. Sanders; Charles Durning
- Cinematography: Jan Kiesser
- Edited by: Debra Neil-Fisher; Carroll Timothy O'Meara
- Music by: Randy Edelman
- Production companies: Hollywood Pictures; Silver Screen Partners IV; Chestnut Hill Productions
- Distributed by: Buena Vista Pictures Distribution
- Release date: July 26, 1991
- Running time: 89 minutes
- Country: United States
- Language: English
- Budget: $24 million
- Box office: $11,128,309 (US)

V.I. Warshawski is a 1991 American action comedy film directed by Jeff Kanew and starring Kathleen Turner, Jay O. Sanders, Charles Durning, Lynnie Godfrey, Anne Pitoniak, Geof Prysirr, Angela Goethals, Stephen Meadows, Frederick Coffin, Stephen Root and Wayne Knight.

The film was based on the Warshawski character created by Sara Paretsky. Critical reviews were mixed to negative, and the film was a box office disappointment.

== Plot ==
Victoria Iphigenia "V.I" Warshawski (Kathleen Turner) is a Chicago-based, freelance private investigator who lives the part of the hard-boiled detective, but below the surface, she is a softy. One night, while she is drinking at her favorite bar, she meets an ex-Blackhawks hockey player named "Boom-Boom" Grafalk (Stephen Meadows). The two connect and a romance appears to be in the making, but Warshawski is surprised when "Boom-Boom" appears at her doorstep later that night with his 13-year-old daughter Kat (Angela Goethals) in tow.

He asks Warshawski if she could watch her, and Warshawski agrees. Later that night, "Boom-Boom" is killed in a boat explosion, and Kat hires Warshawski to track down her father's killer. In doing so, she befriends the victim's daughter; together they set out to crack the case.

== Cast ==
- Kathleen Turner as Victoria Iphigenia "V.I." Warshawski
- Jay O. Sanders as Murray Ryerson
- Angela Goethals as Katherine "Kat" Grafalk
- Charles Durning as Lieutenant Bobby Mallory
- Frederick Coffin as Horton Grafalk
- Charles McCaughan as Trumble Grafalk
- Stephen Meadows as Bernard "Boom-Boom" Grafalk
- Nancy Paul as Paige Wilson-Grafalk
- Wayne Knight as Earl "Bonehead" Smeissen
- Lynnie Godfrey as Sal Barthele
- Anne Pitoniak as Dr. Charlotte "Lotty" Herschel
- Stephen Root as Mickey
- Robert Clotworthy as Philip Pugh
- Tom Allard as Eddie "Big Eddie"
- Mike Hagerty as "Babe"
- Lee Arenberg as "Flesh"
- John Beasley as Ernie
- Everett Smith as McGraw
- Herb Muller as Contreras
- Geof Prysirr as Ron Whartley
- Gene Hartline as Thug #1
- Gary Epper as Thug #2
- John Fujioka as Sumitora

== Production ==
=== Writing ===
The film was based on a series of books by Sara Paretsky. Screenwriters Edward Taylor, David Aaron Cohen, and Nick Thiel adapted only one of Sara Paretsky's novels, Deadlock, for the script for this movie, which took at least one liberty with the story. Whereas Paretsky had written the novel as a serious mystery, the screenwriters took an almost comedic approach. Paretsky was especially angry over the original script that had the independent female detective subordinate to a male counterpart for fear that a female character could not hold the lead role.

The film's plot is very different from that of Deadlock. In the book the ex-Blackhawks player Boom-Boom was the protagonist detective's cousin and lifelong companion, rather than a chance-met stranger; he had no daughter; and "Grafalk" was the family name of another character altogether, a devious shipping magnate who had a major role in the book but was dropped from the film.

=== Casting ===
Initially, the producers wanted to set the film in Baltimore and cast either Amy Madigan, Bette Midler or Jane Fonda as Warshawski. Kathleen Turner reprised her character V.I. Warshawski in a series of radio plays on BBC Radio 4, the radio version of Deadlock itself being broadcast in 1993.

=== Filming ===
Principal production began in Chicago in November 1990. Scenes were filmed at Wrigley Field, Chicago; Green Mill Cocktail Lounge - 4802 N. Broadway Avenue, Chicago, (used as the Golden Glow Cocktail Lounge); San Pedro, California, Long Beach, California; Fire Station 23 - 225 E. 5th Street, Los Angeles, and Warner Bros Studios. Completed shooting February 27, 1991.

== Reception ==
Janet Maslin of The New York Times had mixed thoughts about the film but commended the acting: "It's too bad that V.I. Warshawski is itself a lot less glamorous than Ms. Turner's performance, since the character could easily be the centerpiece of a more appealing film...V.I. Warshawski has a breezy style and a serviceable, even surprising detective plot. And it has Ms. Turner, who makes the most of V.I. Warshawski's sardonic humor."

Roger Ebert of The Chicago Sun-Times gave the film 3 out of 4 stars and praised Turner's performance: "Kathleen Turner fits the character more closely than I would have imagined. Her laugh seems aged by whiskey, her smile is brave in the face of trouble, she kisses guys as if she'll never see them again, and she's usually right."

The movie debuted poorly at the box office. On Rotten Tomatoes, it holds a rating of 24% based on 29 reviews. The consensus summarizes: "With V.I. Warshawski, Kathleen Turner proves more than up to the task of leading a cop thriller -- it's the script that sadly isn't up to snuff."

== Home media ==
The film was released on VHS on November 13, 1991; it was released on Laserdisc (4:3 ratio) the following year and on DVD on June 4, 2002 (in a 1.85:1 ratio). It was released on Blu-ray in May 2011.
