= Kathleen Turner =

American actress (born 1954)

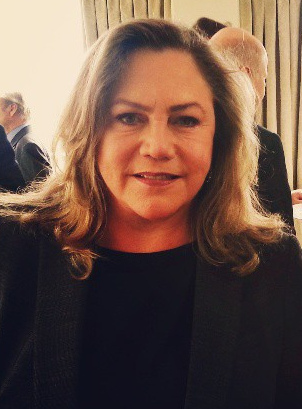
- Turner in 2013
- Born: Mary Kathleen Turner; June 19, 1954 (age 72); Springfield, Missouri, U.S.
- Education: Southwest Missouri State University; University of Maryland, Baltimore County (BFA)
- Occupation: Actress
- Years active: 1977–present
- Spouse: Jay Weiss (m. 1984; div. 2007)
- Children: 1
- Website: kathleenturner.net

Mary Kathleen Turner (born June 19, 1954) is an American actress. Known for her deep, husky voice, she is the recipient of two Golden Globes, as well as nominations for an Academy Award, a Grammy, and two Tony Awards.

After debuting both off and on Broadway in 1977, followed by her television debut as Nola Dancy Aldrich on the NBC soap opera The Doctors (1978–1979), Turner rose to prominence with her portrayal of Matty Walker in Body Heat (1981), which brought her a reputation as a sex symbol. She worked solidly throughout the 1980s, in films such as The Man with Two Brains (1983), Crimes of Passion, Romancing the Stone (both 1984), Prizzi's Honor, The Jewel of the Nile (both 1985), Switching Channels, The Accidental Tourist (both 1988), and The War of the Roses (1989). For her portrayal of the title character in Peggy Sue Got Married (1986), Turner was nominated for the 1987 Academy Award for Best Actress. Subsequent credits include V.I. Warshawski (1991), Serial Mom (1994), Baby Geniuses, The Virgin Suicides (both 1999), Beautiful (2000), Marley & Me (2008), and Dumb and Dumber To (2014).

Outside film, Turner guest-starred as Sue Collini on Showtime's Californication (2009) and Roz Volander on Netflix's The Kominsky Method (2019–2021). She also played Charles Bing, the transgender father of Chandler Bing, on the seventh season of Friends (2001). Turner's voice work includes Jessica Rabbit in Who Framed Roger Rabbit (1988), as well as characters on television series such as The Simpsons, Family Guy, King of the Hill, and Rick and Morty.

== Early life and education ==
Born June 19, 1954 in Springfield, Missouri to Patsy (née Magee) and Allen Richard Turner, a U.S. Foreign Service officer who grew up in China (where Turner's great-grandfather had been a Methodist missionary), Mary Kathleen Turner is the third of four children. She is the only one of her parents' children to be born in the United States. She has a sister, Susan, and two brothers.

Raised in a strictly conservative Christian home, Turner's interest in performing was discouraged by both of her parents: "My father was of missionary stock", she later explained, "so theater and acting were just one step up from being a streetwalker, you know? So when I was performing in school, he would drive my mom [there] and sit in the car. She'd come out at intermissions and tell him, 'She's doing very well.'"

Owing to her father's position with the Foreign Service, Turner grew up in Canada, Cuba, Venezuela, and in London, England. She attended high school at The American School in London, graduating in 1972. "The start of real acting for me began during high school in London", she stated in her 2008 memoir. "There were seven of us who were sort of a theater mafia. We produced, directed, acted, chose the plays, got one teacher fired and another one hired." Her father died of a coronary thrombosis one week before her graduation, and the family returned to Springfield, Missouri. At the age of 19, Turner began volunteering at a local Planned Parenthood office.

She attended Southwest Missouri State University for two years, studying theater. During this period, director Herbert Blau saw her performance in The House of Blue Leaves. Blau invited her to spend her senior year at the University of Maryland, Baltimore County, where she received a Bachelor of Fine Arts degree in 1977. During that period, Turner acted in several productions directed by film and stage director Steve Yeager.

== Career ==
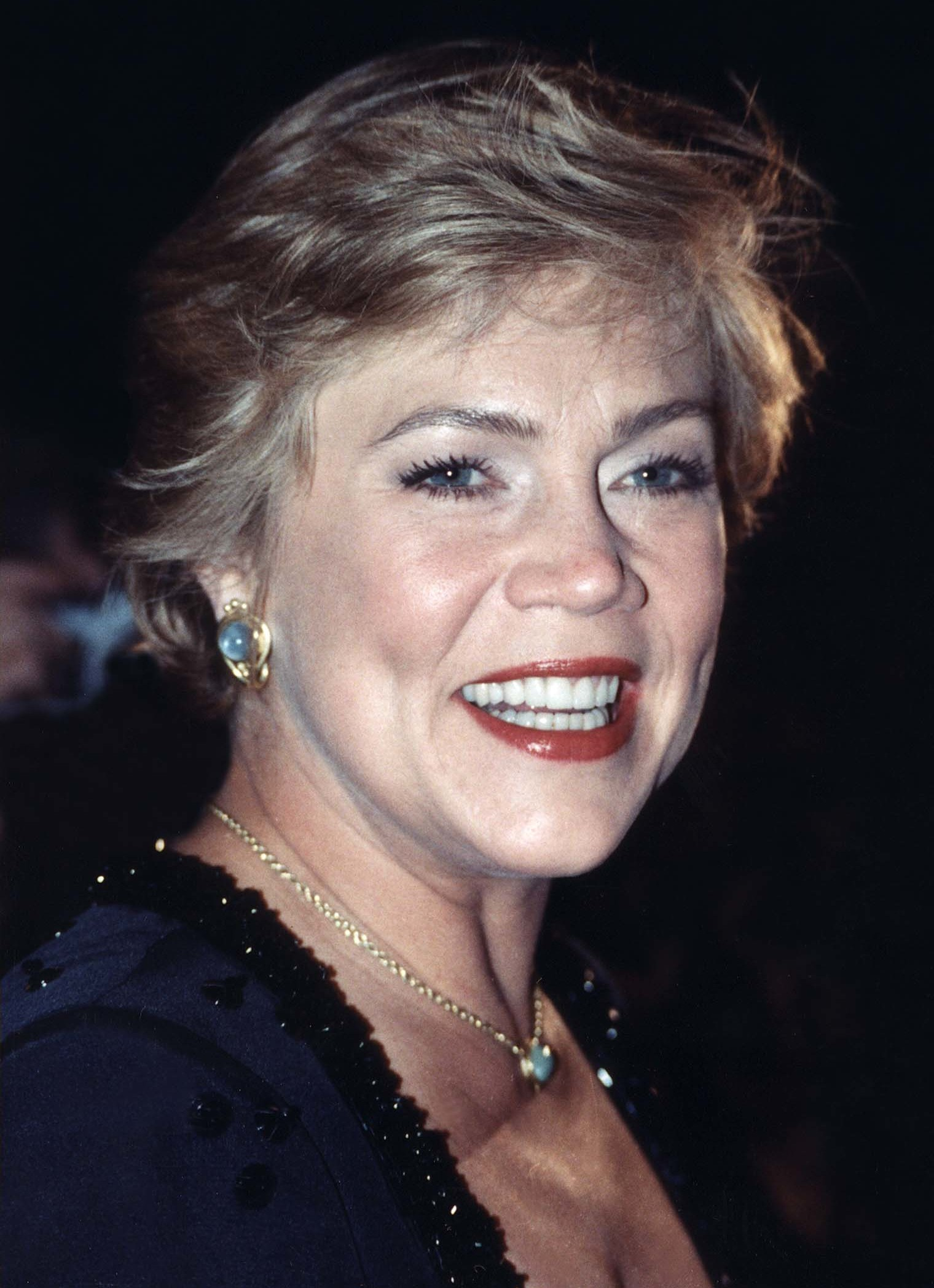
Turner in 1999

=== Theatre work and Broadway debut ===
Several months after moving to New York City in 1977, Turner took over the female lead in Michael Zetter's play Mister T, which co-starred Jonathan Frakes and played at Soho Repertory Theatre. That production marked her off-Broadway debut. Several months later, Turner made her Broadway debut as Judith Hastings in Gemini by Albert Innaurato, staged at The Little Theatre (later the Helen Hayes Theater) and starring Danny Aiello. It opened May 21, 1977, during the time when she was appearing in the soap The Doctors.

=== Transition to TV and film ===
In 1978, Turner made her television debut in the NBC daytime soap The Doctors as the second Nola Dancy Aldrich. She made her film debut in 1981 as the ruthless Matty Walker in the thriller Body Heat; the role brought her to international prominence. Empire cited the film in 1995 when it named her one of the 100 Sexiest Stars in Film History. The New York Times wrote in 2005 that, propelled by her "jaw-dropping movie debut [in] Body Heat ... she built a career on adventurousness and frank sexuality born of robust physicality". Turner ultimately became one of the top box-office draws, and most sought-after actresses of the 1980s and early 1990s.

Turner stated in 2018, "Body Heat was a blessing because I went straight to being a leading actor and I didn't have to suffer any of this predatory male behaviour like many young actresses. It doesn't frustrate me that nearly four decades after that film I'm still referred to as a sexual icon. I got over that a long time ago."

Because of her deep, husky voice, Turner was often compared to a young Lauren Bacall. When the two met, Turner reportedly introduced herself by saying, "Hi, I'm the young you."

=== Stardom ===
After Body Heat, Turner steered away from femme fatale roles to "prevent typecasting" and "because femme fatale roles had a shelf-life". Consequently, her first project after this was the 1983 comedy The Man With Two Brains. Turner co-starred in Romancing the Stone with Michael Douglas and Danny DeVito. Film critic Pauline Kael wrote of her performance as writer Joan Wilder, "Turner knows how to use her dimples amusingly and how to dance like a woman who didn't know she could; her star performance is exhilarating." Romancing the Stone was a surprise hit: she won a Golden Globe for her role in the film, and it became one of the top-ten-grossing movies of 1984. Turner teamed with Douglas and DeVito again the following year for its sequel, The Jewel of the Nile. Pre-production for the movie was fraught with conflict, because Turner refused to commit to the "terrible" script she had been delivered. When she said no, 20th Century Fox threatened her with a US$25 million breach of contract lawsuit. Eventually Douglas, also the film's producer, agreed to undertake rewrites on the script to make it more acceptable to Turner, which led to much back-and-forth between the two as the script was retooled right up to when shooting started in Fez, Morocco.

Several months before Jewel, Turner starred in Prizzi's Honor with Jack Nicholson, winning a second Golden Globe award, and later starred in Peggy Sue Got Married, which co-starred Nicolas Cage. For Peggy Sue, she received the award for Best Actress from the U.S. National Board of Review of Motion Pictures, as well as an Academy Award nomination for Best Actress.

In 1988's toon-noir Who Framed Roger Rabbit, she was the speaking voice of cartoon femme fatale Jessica Rabbit, intoning the famous line, "I'm not bad, I'm just drawn that way." Her uncredited, sultry performance was acclaimed as "the kind of sexpot ball-breaker she was made for". (Amy Irving provided Jessica Rabbit's singing voice in the scene in which the character first appears in the movie.) That same year, Turner also appeared in Switching Channels, which was a loose remake of the 1940 hit film His Girl Friday; this, in turn, was a loose remake of the Ben Hecht-Charles MacArthur comedy The Front Page.

Turner was the subject of the 1986 song "The Kiss of Kathleen Turner" by Austrian techno-pop singer Falco. In 1989, Turner teamed with Douglas and DeVito for a third time, in The War of the Roses, but this time as Douglas's disillusioned wife, with DeVito in the role of a divorce attorney who told their shared story. The New York Times praised the trio, saying that "Mr. Douglas and Ms. Turner have never been more comfortable a team ... each of them is at his or her comic best when being as awful as both are required to be here ... [Kathleen Turner is] evilly enchanting." In that film, Turner played a former gymnast and, as in other roles, did many of her own stunts. (She broke her nose two years later, filming 1991's V.I. Warshawski.)

=== Slowed by rheumatoid arthritis ===
Turner remained an A-list film star leading lady in the early 1990s, starring in V.I. Warshawski and Undercover Blues, until rheumatoid arthritis seriously restricted her activities. She also blamed her age, stating, "when I was 40, the roles started slowing down, I started getting offers to play mothers and grandmothers."

In 1992, during the filming of Serial Mom, she began experiencing "inexplicable pains and fevers." The rheumatoid arthritis diagnosis was made about a year later. Turner's appearance changed after the rheumatoid arthritis diagnosis, due to the condition itself and the side effects of treatment. In 2005, an article in The New York Times stated: "Rumors began circulating that she was drinking too much." In her memoir, she said: "Many people bought the assumption that I'd turned into a heavy drinker. I couldn't publicly refute them because I believed it was worse to have people know that I had this terrible illness... We – Jay, my agent, myself – felt it was imperative to keep my rheumatoid arthritis quiet."

Turner's career as a leading lady went into a steep decline and she was seen in fewer successful films. After the symptoms appeared, she turned down a lead role in The Bridges of Madison County, which became a big hit. She appeared in the low-budget House of Cards as well as the comedy-drama Moonlight & Valentino, and had supporting roles in A Simple Wish, The Real Blonde, and Sofia Coppola's The Virgin Suicides. She also provided voice work on The Simpsons in the 1994 episode "Lisa vs. Malibu Stacy".

Turner was originally cast as Zira in Disney's The Lion King II: Simba's Pride. Turner talked about the role and even sang a portion of her character's song (stating the film would be her singing debut) during an interview on The Rosie O'Donnell Show on March 10, 1998. She was replaced by Suzanne Pleshette in the final film.

=== Remission ===
Turner's rheumatoid arthritis progressed for about eight years. Then, thanks to newly available treatments, it went into remission. She was seen increasingly on television, including three episodes of Friends, where she appeared as Chandler Bing's father, a drag performer.

In 2006, Turner guest-starred on FX's Nip/Tuck, playing a phone sex operator in need of laryngeal surgery. She appeared in a small role in 2008's Marley & Me and also played a defense attorney on Law & Order. In 2009, she played the role of Charlie Runkle's sexually hyperactive boss in season three of the television series Californication.

Turner starred in the indie film The Perfect Family in 2011 and had supporting roles in Nurse 3D (2013) and the comedy sequel Dumb and Dumber To in 2014.

She appeared in two episodes of the Hulu series The Path (2016–17), starred in an episode of the anthology series Dolly Parton's Heartstrings (2019) and guest-starred on two episodes of the CBS comedy series Mom in 2020. On the Netflix dramedy series The Kominsky Method, Turner was a guest in season 2 (2019) and became a main cast member in season 3 (2021). The series reunited her with fellow actor Michael Douglas for the first time since The War of the Roses.

=== Voice acting ===
Turner provided the voice of Jessica Rabbit in the 1988 live action/animated film Who Framed Roger Rabbit, its three animated short film spinoffs, and in the Disneyland attraction spinoff, Roger Rabbit's Car Toon Spin. In 2006, Turner voiced the character Constance in the animated film Monster House. Later, she provided radio commercial voice-overs for Lay's potato chips. BBC Radio 4 produced four radio dramas based on the V. I. Warshawski novels by Sara Paretsky. Two of them, Killing Orders and Deadlock, released in 2007, featured Turner reprising her 1991 film role, which had been based on Paretsky's novel Deadlock; however, the final series, Bitter Medicine, released in 2009, had Sharon Gless take over the part. In 2015, she narrated the anthology drama film Emily & Tim. Turner also had voice guest roles on the animated series King of the Hill, Family Guy, 3Below: Tales of Arcadia, Rick and Morty, Summer Camp Island, and Wizards: Tales of Arcadia.

=== Stage career ===
After 1990s roles in Broadway productions of Indiscretions and Cat on a Hot Tin Roof (for which she earned a Tony Award nomination for Best Actress), Turner moved to London in 2000 to star in a stage version of The Graduate. The BBC reported that initially mediocre ticket sales for The Graduate "went through the roof when it was announced that Turner, then aged 45, would appear naked on stage". While her performance as the seductive Mrs. Robinson was popular with audiences, with sustained high box office for the duration of Turner's run, she received mixed reviews from critics. The play transferred to Broadway in 2002 to similar critical reaction.

In 2005, Turner beat a score of other contenders (including Jessica Lange, Frances McDormand, and Bette Midler) for the role of Martha in a 2005 Broadway revival of Edward Albee's Who's Afraid of Virginia Woolf? at the Longacre Theatre. Albee later explained to the New York Times that when Turner read for the part with her eventual co-star Bill Irwin, he heard "an echo of the 'revelation' that he had felt years ago when the parts were read by [Uta] Hagen and Arthur Hill." He added that Turner had "a look of voluptuousness, a woman of appetites, yes ... but a look of having suffered, as well."

Ben Brantley praised Turner at length, writing:

As the man-eating Martha, Ms. Turner, a movie star whose previous theater work has been variable, finally secures her berth as a first-rate, depth-probing stage actress ... [A]t 50, this actress can look ravishing and ravaged, by turns. In the second act, she is as predatorily sexy as she was in the movie Body Heat. But in the third and last act, she looks old, bereft, stripped of all erotic flourish. I didn't think I would ever be able to see Virginia Woolf again without thinking of Ms. Hagen [Uta Hagen]. But watching Ms. Turner in that last act, fully clothed but more naked than she ever was in The Graduate, I didn't see the specter of Ms. Hagen. All I saw was Ms. Turner. No, let's be fair. All I saw was Martha.

As Martha, Turner received her second Tony Award nomination for Best Actress in a Play, losing to Cherry Jones. The production was transferred to London's Apollo Theatre in 2006. She starred in Sandra Ryan Heyward's one-woman show, Tallulah, which she toured across the U.S.

In August 2010, Turner portrayed the role of Sister Jamison Connelly in Matthew Lombardo's drama High at Hartford TheaterWorks. The production transferred to Broadway at the Booth Theatre where it opened in previews on March 25, 2011, officially on April 19, 2011, and an announced quick closing on April 24, 2011. However, in a rare move, the production was revived, still headed by Turner, to undertake a national tour which began in Boston in December 2012.

From August to October 28, 2012, Turner appeared in Red Hot Patriot: The Kick-Ass Wit of Molly Ivins, a play about the legendary liberal Texas columnist Molly Ivins, at Arena Stage in Washington, DC. In December 2014 and January 2015, Turner performed the same show at Berkeley Repertory Theatre. She appeared again at Arena Stage in the title role of Bertolt Brecht's Mother Courage and Her Children, which opened in February 2014, and playing Joan Didion in the one-woman show The Year of Magical Thinking, based on Didion's memoir of the same name, in October and November 2016. In February 2019, Turner made her debut at the Metropolitan Opera in New York City in the speaking role of The Duchess of Krakentorp in Donizetti's opera La fille du régiment.

=== Other work ===
In addition to her work on stage and screen, Turner has taught acting classes at New York University.

== Reception and public image ==
Turner's performance in Body Heat gave her a reputation as a sex symbol. She is considered one of the most prominent sex symbols of the 1980s, a designation largely attributed to her performance in Body Heat. Turner worked to avoid being typecast in similar roles. She described "rage" as a common theme running through most of her characters. Her deep, husky voice has been considered a trademark throughout her career. Ann Lee of The Guardian described her as "magnetic" on screen "fierce, bold and sultry, with an impeccable sense of comic timing to match that oh-so-husky and commanding voice".

By the late 1980s, Turner had acquired a reputation for being difficult, what The New York Times called "a certifiable diva". She admitted that she had developed into "not a very kind person", and actress Eileen Atkins—with whom she starred in the play Indiscretions on Broadway—referred to her as "an amazing nightmare". In 2018, she commented on her reputation, stating: "The 'difficult' thing was pure gender crap. If a man comes on set and says, 'Here's how I see this being done', people go, 'He's decisive.' If a woman does it, they say, 'Oh, fuck. There she goes.'" Turner has defended herself against Atkins' claims, saying that Atkins harbored animosity towards her because she was having trouble memorizing her lines, which Atkins found very unprofessional. Turner later realized that medication she was taking for her rheumatoid arthritis was making her "fuzzy." She added that, on days when the rheumatoid arthritis in her wrist was especially bad and she warned the other cast members not to touch it, Atkins would intentionally sit on it during a scene where Turner had to play dead, causing Turner extreme pain. Speaking about the major differences between theatre and film acting in terms of the dynamics between the individual and the collective, performing arts scholar Octavian Saiu praised Turner for her great generosity as a veritable team player who finds herself more at home on stage for that reason.

== Personal life ==
Michael Douglas said he started a secret relationship with Turner while they were filming Romancing the Stone (1984) and while Douglas was separated from his wife.

Turner married real estate entrepreneur Jay Weiss of New York City in 1984, and they had one daughter, singer Rachel Ann Weiss, who was born on October 14, 1987. Turner and Weiss divorced in December 2007, but Turner has said, "[Jay]'s still my best friend."

=== Health ===
In 1992, Turner began experiencing what she described as "inexplicable pains and fevers." She was diagnosed with rheumatoid arthritis about a year later. By the time she was diagnosed, Turner "could hardly turn her head or walk, and was told she would end up in a wheelchair". Physical movement was so painful Turner struggled with everyday tasks like drinking water or putting on shoes.

Medications used to treat the rheumatoid arthritis caused changes in her appearance, which led to tabloid news speculation. Turner found this speculation hurtful, but opted against discussing her medical problems with the public. She also drank excessive amounts of alcohol after the rheumatoid arthritis diagnosis, and admitted her personality became unpleasant due to alcohol misuse.

Despite drug therapy to help her condition, Turner's rheumatoid arthritis progressed for about eight years until it went into remission due to new treatments.

A few weeks after leaving the production of the play The Graduate in November 2002, Turner was admitted into the Geisinger Marworth Treatment Center in Waverly, Pennsylvania, for the treatment of alcoholism. She stated her drinking becomes a problem when she is not busy with acting, and she never abused alcohol while performing.

=== Activism ===
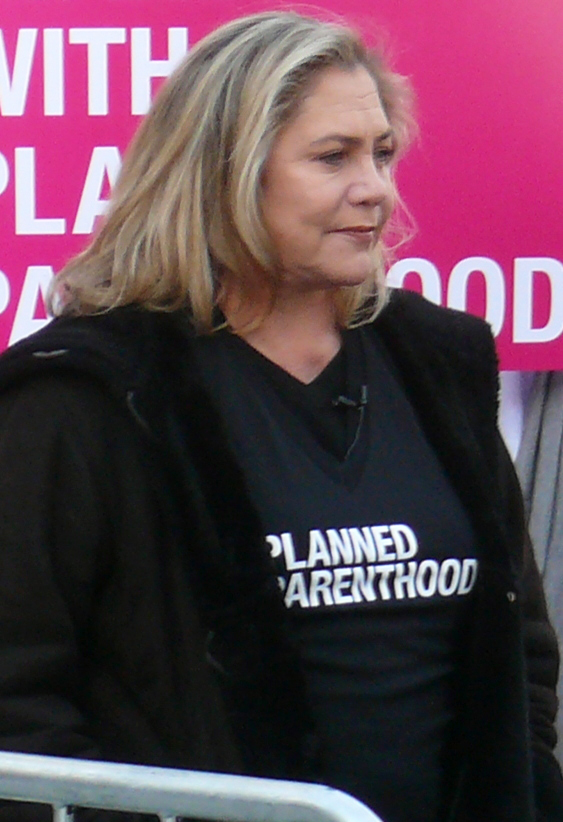
Turner at the Planned Parenthood Rally in New York City in 2011

Turner has worked with Planned Parenthood of America since age 19, and later became a chairperson. She also serves on the board of People for the American Way, and volunteers at Amnesty International and Citymeals-on-Wheels. She was one of John Kerry's first celebrity endorsers. She has been a frequent donor to the Democratic Party. She has also worked to raise awareness of rheumatoid arthritis.

=== Memoirs and interviews ===
In the mid-2000s, Turner collaborated with Gloria Feldt on the writing of her memoirs, Send Yourself Roses: Thoughts on My Life, Love, and Leading Roles. The book was published in 2008. In the book, Turner claimed that, while they were filming Peggy Sue Got Married, her co-star Nicolas Cage had got drunk and stolen a Chihuahua that he liked. In turn, Cage filed a lawsuit against Turner and her book publisher in the UK, who took an excerpt from the book and posted it on their website (before publication). Cage argued defamation and damage to character and won the case, resulting in retractions, legal fees, and a donation to charity. Turner later publicly apologized. During an interview on The View, Turner apologized for any distress she might have caused Cage regarding an incident that took place 20 years earlier.

On August 7, 2018, Vulture published an in-depth interview with Turner, wherein she expressed her opinion on a wide range of issues, from Elizabeth Taylor's acting skills to what it was like meeting Donald Trump in the 1980s. Turner's frankness and certain revelations she made caused the article to be widely shared in different media outlets, which led to her name trending on Google.

== Filmography ==
Key
†	Denotes films that have not yet been released

=== Film ===
Year	Title	Role	Notes
1981	Body Heat	Matty Walker	
1983	The Man with Two Brains	Dolores Benedict	
1984	Romancing the Stone	Joan Wilder	
1984	A Breed Apart	Stella Clayton	
1984	Crimes of Passion	Joanna Crane / China Blue	
1985	Prizzi's Honor	Irene Walkervisks / Irene Walker	
1985	The Jewel of the Nile	Joan Wilder	
1986	Peggy Sue Got Married	Peggy Sue Bodell	
1987	Julia and Julia	Julia	
1988	Switching Channels	Christy Colleran	
1988	Who Framed Roger Rabbit	Jessica Rabbit (voice)	Uncredited
1988	The Accidental Tourist	Sarah Leary	
1989	Tummy Trouble	Jessica Rabbit (voice)	Short film
1989	The War of the Roses	Barbara Rose	
1990	Roller Coaster Rabbit	Jessica Rabbit (voice)	Short film
1991	V.I. Warshawski	Victoria "V. I." Warshawski	
1993	Trail Mix-Up	Jessica Rabbit (voice)	Short film
1993	Naked in New York	Dana Coles	
1993	House of Cards	Ruth Matthews	
1993	Undercover Blues	Jane Blue	
1994	Serial Mom	Beverly R. Sutphin	
1995	Moonlight and Valentino	Alberta Trager	
1995	The Snow Queen	The Snow Queen (voice)	English dub
1997	Bad Baby	Gloria Goode (voice)	
1997	A Simple Wish	Claudia	
1997	The Real Blonde	Dee Dee Taylor	
1999	Baby Geniuses	Elena Kinder	
1999	Love and Action in Chicago	Middleman	
1999	The Virgin Suicides	Mrs. Lisbon	
2000	Beautiful	Verna Chickle	
2000	Prince of Central Park	Rebecca Cairn	
2005	The Lady in Question is Charles Busch	Herself	Documentary
2006	Monster House	Constance (voice)	
2008	Marley & Me	Ms. Kornblut	
2011	The Perfect Family	Eileen Cleary	
2013	Nurse 3D	Head Nurse Betty Watson	
2013	Gods Behaving Badly	Styx	Unreleased
2014	Dumb and Dumber To	Fraida Felcher	
2015	Emily & Tim	The Narrator (voice)	
2017	Someone Else's Wedding	Barbara Haines	Released as Another Kind of Wedding
2022	The Swearing Jar	Bev	
2022	The Estate	Aunt Hilda	
2024	The Long Game	Mariah McKay	
2025	Animal Farm	Benjamin (voice)	
2025	Listen to Me	Gertrude Stein	
2026	Joan's Teeth	Joan	Short film

=== Television ===
Year	Title	Role	Notes
1978–1979	The Doctors	Nola Dancy Aldrich	86 episodes
1994	The Simpsons	Stacy Lovell (voice)	Episode: "Lisa vs. Malibu Stacy"
1995	Friends at Last	Fanny Connelyn	TV movie
1998	Legalese	Brenda Whitlass	TV movie
2000	Cinderella	Claudette	TV movie
2000	King of the Hill	Miss Liz Strickland (voice)	3 episodes
2001	Friends	Charles Bing / Helena Handbasket	Episodes: "The One with Chandler's Dad", "The One with Chandler and Monica's Wedding"
2005	...A Father...A Son...Once Upon a Time in Hollywood	Herself	Television documentary
2006	Law & Order	Rebecca Shane	Episode: "Magnet"
2006	Nip/Tuck	Cindy Plumb	Episode: "Cindy Plumb"
2009	Californication	Sue Collini	10 episodes
2016–2017	The Path	Brenda Roberts	2 episodes
2017	American Masters	Narrator	Episode: “Edgar Allan Poe: Buried Alive”
2017	Family Guy	Herself (voice)	Episode: "Foxx in the Men House"
2019	Lovestruck	Grace	TV movie
2019	3Below: Tales of Arcadia	Gwendolyn (voice)	Episode: "There's Something About Gwen (of Gorbon)"
2019	Heartstrings	Mary "Old Bones" Shaw	Episode: "These Old Bones"
2019	Rick and Morty	Monogatron leader's Wife (voice)	Episode: "The Old Man and the Seat"
2019, 2021	The Kominsky Method	Roz Volander	6 episodes
2020	Mom	"Cookie"	2 episodes
2020	Summer Camp Island	Mole Judge (voice)	Episode: "Molar Moles"
2020	Prop Culture	Herself	Episode: "Who Framed Roger Rabbit"
2020	Wizards: Tales of Arcadia	Lady of The Lake (voice)	Episode: "Lady of the Lake"
2022	HouseBroken	Nancy (voice)	Episode: "Who's Found Themselves in One of Those Magical Christmas Life Swap Switcheroos?"
2023	White House Plumbers	Dita Beard	

== Theater ==
Theater work by Kathleen Turner
Year	Play	Role	Venue	Notes
1977	Gemini	Judith Hastings	Little Theatre, Broadway	Replacement
1981	A Midsummer Night's Dream	Titania	Arena Stage, Regional	
1989	Love Letters	Melissa Gardner	Promenade Theatre, Off-Broadway	
1990	Cat on a Hot Tin Roof	Maggie	Eugene O'Neill Theatre, Broadway	
1995	Indiscretions	Yvonne	Ethel Barrymore Theatre, Broadway	
2000	The Graduate	Mrs. Robinson	Gielgud Theatre, West End	
2000–2001	Tallulah	Tallulah Bankhead	National tour	
2002	The Graduate	Mrs. Robinson	Plymouth Theatre, Broadway	
2004	The Exonerated	Sunny Jacobs	Casa Mañana Theatre, Regional	
2005	Who's Afraid of Virginia Woolf?	Martha	Longacre Theatre, Broadway	
2006	Who's Afraid of Virginia Woolf?	Martha	Apollo Theatre, West End	
2007	Who's Afraid of Virginia Woolf?	Martha	National tour	
2007	Crimes of the Heart	Unknown	Williamstown Theatre Festival, Regional	Directed only
2008	Crimes of the Heart	Unknown	Laura Pels Theatre, Off-Broadway	Directed only
2009	The Third Story	Peg / Dr. Rutenspitz	Lucille Lortel Theatre, Off-Broadway	
2010	Red Hot Patriot: The Kick-Ass Wit of Molly Ivins	Molly Ivins	Philadelphia Theatre Company, Regional	
2010	High	Sister Jamison Connelly	TheaterWorks, Regional	
2010	High	Sister Jamison Connelly	Cincinnati Playhouse in the Park, Regional	
2010	High	Sister Jamison Connelly	The Repertory Theatre of St. Louis, Regional	
2011	High	Sister Jamison Connelly	Booth Theatre, Broadway	
2012	Red Hot Patriot: The Kick-Ass Wit of Molly Ivins	Molly Ivins	Geffen Playhouse, Regional	
2012	Red Hot Patriot: The Kick-Ass Wit of Molly Ivins	Molly Ivins	Arena Stage, Regional	
2012	The Killing of Sister George	June Buckridge	Long Wharf Theatre, Regional	Also directed
2014	Mother Courage and Her Children	Mother Courage	Arena Stage, Regional	
2014	Bakersfield Mist	Maude Gutman	Duchess Theatre, West End	
2014–2015	Red Hot Patriot: The Kick-Ass Wit of Molly Ivins	Molly Ivins	Berkeley Repertory Theatre, Regional	
2015	Would You Still Love Me If...	Victoria Pruitt	New World Stages Stage V, Off-Broadway	Also directed
2016	The Year of Magical Thinking	Joan Didion	Arena Stage, Regional	
2017	An Act of God	God	George Street Playhouse, Regional	
2024	A Little Night Music	Madame Armfeldt	Ogunquit Playhouse, Regional	

== Audio ==
Audio work by Kathleen Turner
Year	Title	Role	Notes
2023	White House Plumbers Podcast	Herself	Episode 2

== Accolades ==
Accolades for Kathleen Turner
Association	Year	Nominated work	Category	Results	Ref
Academy Awards	1987	Peggy Sue Got Married	Best Actress	Nominated	
Antalya Golden Orange Film Festival	2015	—N/a	Honorary Award	Won	
BAFTA Awards	1983	—N/a	Most Outstanding Newcomer to Leading Film Roles	Nominated	
Chicago International Film Festival	1992	—N/a	Piper-Heidsieck Award	Won	
Chlotrudis Awards	1995	Serial Mom	Best Actress	Nominated	
David di Donatello Awards	1990	The War of the Roses	Best Foreign Actress	Nominated	
Drama Desk Awards	2005	Who's Afraid of Virginia Woolf?	Outstanding Actress in a Play	Nominated	
DVD Exclusive Awards	2001	Love and Action in Chicago	Best Supporting Actress	Nominated	
Golden Globes	1982	Body Heat	New Star of the Year in a Motion Picture	Nominated	
Golden Globes	1985	Romancing the Stone	Best Actress — Motion Picture, Comedy or Musical	Won	
Golden Globes	1986	Prizzi's Honor	Best Actress — Motion Picture, Comedy or Musical	Won	
Golden Globes	1987	Peggy Sue Got Married	Best Actress — Motion Picture, Comedy or Musical	Nominated	
Golden Globes	1990	The War of the Roses	Best Actress — Motion Picture, Comedy or Musical	Nominated	
Grammy Awards	2001	The Complete Shakespeare Sonnets	Best Spoken Word Album	Nominated	
Hasty Pudding Theatricals	1989	—N/a	Woman of the Year	Won	
Los Angeles Film Critics Association	1984	Romancing the Stone / Crimes of Passion	Best Actress	Won	
Montréal World Film Festival	2013	—N/a	Grand Prix Special des Amériques	Won	
National Board of Review	1986	Peggy Sue Got Married	Best Actress	Won	
National Society of Film Critics Awards	1985	Romancing the Stone / Crimes of Passion	Best Actress	Nominated	
National Society of Film Critics Awards	1987	Peggy Sue Got Married	Best Actress (tied with Sandrine Bonnaire for Vagabond)	Nominated	
New York Film Critics Circle Awards	1986	Peggy Sue Got Married	Best Actress	Nominated	
Online Film & Television Association	2001	Friends	Best Guest Actress in a Comedy Series	Nominated	
People's Choice Awards	1986	Prizzi's Honor	Favorite Motion Picture Actress	Nominated	
People's Choice Awards	1987	Peggy Sue Got Married	Favorite Motion Picture Actress	Nominated	
People's Choice Awards	1990	The War of the Roses	Favorite Motion Picture Actress	Nominated	
Provincetown International Film Festival	2007	—N/a	Lifetime Achievement Award	Won	
Sant Jordi Awards	1986	Prizzi’s Honor / Crimes of Passion	Best Foreign Actress	Won	
Sant Jordi Awards	1988	Peggy Sue Got Married / Giulia e Giulia	Best Foreign Actress	Nominated	
Santo Domingo OutFest	2012	The Perfect Family	Outstanding Performance	Won	
Saturn Awards	1987	Peggy Sue Got Married	Best Actress	Nominated	
Savannah Film Festival	2004	—N/a	Lifetime Achievement Award	Won	
Screen Actors Guild Awards	2021	The Kominsky Method	Outstanding Performance by an Ensemble in a Comedy Series	Nominated	
Theatre World Awards	1990	Cat on a Hot Tin Roof	Special Award (for Outstanding Broadway Debut)	Won	
Tony Awards	1990	Cat on a Hot Tin Roof	Best Actress in a Play	Nominated	
Tony Awards	2005	Who's Afraid of Virginia Woolf?	Best Actress in a Play	Nominated	
WorldFest Houston	1993	House of Cards	Best Actress	Won	
