= Indemnity Only =

1982 novel by Sara Paretsky

- First edition
- Author: Sara Paretsky
- Language: English
- Genre: Mystery novel
- Publisher: Dial Press
- Publication date: 1982
- Publication place: United States
- Media type: Print

Indemnity Only is a mystery novel written by Sara Paretsky.

== Summary ==
V. I. Warshawski, a private detective, is employed by a man who calls himself John Thayer to find his son's girlfriend, Anita Hill. However, as she begins her search, V.I. almost immediately comes across Peter Thayer, John's son, dead. Her investigation takes a definite turn as she discovers her client may have ulterior motives. The man who claims to be John Thayer turns out to be Andrew McGraw, the father of Anita Hill and a big labor union leader. It is later revealed that Anita Hill's real name is Anita McGraw, and she had reasons for disappearing after Peter's murder. The detective realises she knows too much when she takes a beating from gang member Earl Smeissen. While she attempts to figure out who murdered Peter, she meets various roadblocks. In the same week, the real John Thayer is also killed, which alerts her on to scams and connections between the Knifegrinders labor union, the Ajax Insurance Company, and the Fort Dearborn Trust. She learns that one of Earl's henchmen was identified at the scene of the crime by a witness. Peter's younger sister, Jill Thayer, supplies family information and private documentation in her deceased father's office that support V.I.'s suspicions of insurance fraud, which Peter had first discovered. Her personal relationship with Ralph Devereaux has been kept separate from her work, until it's discovered that his boss, Yardley Masters, has been not only orchestrating these crimes and frauds, but doing some of the killing himself. At Ralph's apartment, Jill is held hostage by the gangsters and Yardley tries to strike again. V.I., using her expert fighting skills and powers of quick deduction, averts his attacks and saves the innocent people in the room. The book ends with Anita finally reunited with her father, but without a promise of forgiveness.

== Writing style ==
Sara Paretsky's novels are written from a feminist perspective, reflecting a period when Paretsky became “socially and politically active, especially in helping lobby for abortion rights and later, after the passage of Roe v. Wade, becoming active in the National Abortion Rights Action League”. Her feminist style may also have been influenced by her youthful “frustration with traditional gender roles, voiced in her novels by different characters, but most consistently espoused by Lieutenant Bobby Mallory". This "partly motivated the strong feminist tone her novels take”. Paretsky uses her "expertise in the insurance business" as a background when she wrote Indemnity Only.

== Themes ==
=== Feminism and Gender Equality ===
"Sara Paretsky, author of a series of mystery novels featuring detective V.I Warshawski, is known for bringing a feminist perspective to the hard-boiled Private Eye genre."(Hileman) Throughout the first book of the series, Indemnity Only, the idea of a strong female lead character is taking shape. Paretsky believed that females need to be confident in what they do. In an interview conducted by Monica Hileman for Sojourner: The Women's Forum, Paretsky says that: "It's important for women to develop confidence in their bodies. I think it's encouraging to have characters like V.I who are confident and can hold their own physically as well as verbally."(Hileman) Paretsky is not saying that women are better than men, but that women are capable of doing what men can do especially in law related careers. Paretsky used her thoughts of feminism to mold the main character, Warshawski. Ann Wilson describes Warshawski as follows: "The primary appeal is readily evident; a heroine modeled on a hard-boiled detective is a woman who is self-reliant and independent, a prototype of a feminist ideal." This sort of woman was not common in the current detective fiction pieces. "The conventional representation of the female body as weaker than a man's and therefore less effective in situations which require physical power is exposed by Paretsky as a ruse: each author puts her heroine in situations which require agility of mind and body."(Wilson) Paretsky's V.I Warshawksi opened the door to a new generation of detective writing.

== Critical reception ==
Paretsky's first novel received favorable reviews. Publishers Weekly called Indemnity Only "the start of a very promising new mystery series," while Chicago Magazine compared Paretsky's integration of character and environment to past masters of the genre Dashiell Hammett and Chandler. In the 3 March 1982 issue of The New Republic, crime-fiction critic Robin W. Winks described the novel as "thoroughly convincing."

== Character list ==
- V.I. Warshawski- Vic Warshawski is a private detective, who goes on the search for Anita McGraw only to uncover a much more twisted plot of serial murders, thugs, and insurance fraud.
- Peter Thayer- John Thayer's son and also Anita's boyfriend. He is found dead in his apartment, having been murdered after discovering too much information surrounding the scams that happen at Ajax.
- Ralph Devereux- A good looking man that works for Yardley Masters, who V.I Warshawski strikes up somewhat of a relationship with.
- John Thayer-The father of the dead Peter Thayer. Works for Yardley Masters as well. Also the banker that signed off and helped with the insurance scam.
- Bobby- A cop who is also trying to find Anita “Hill”. He also disapproves of V.I.’s tactics, mostly because he was a close friend of her father, Tony Warshawski, and knew V.I. since she was young.
- Anita McGraw- Peter Thayer's girlfriend that has disappeared. VI Warshawski is in search of her while she hides from the thugs who want to silence her for the illegal information she has about Ajax Insurance.
- Yardley Masters- Friend of John Thayer, and head of Ajax Insurance, who agreed to let Peter work for him only to end up killing him once his job led to his discovery of the fraudulence going on in the company.
- Lotty Herschel- Warshawski's friend, who provides housing for Warshawski after her apartment is ransacked. She is also a doctor, and helps to provide protection for Thayer's daughter.
- Jill Thayer- Daughter of John Thayer and the sister of Peter Thayer. She seems to be the only one that cares about Peter. Technically becomes Warshawski's client as a mean to keep her on the case after her father is killed, but the two obviously share a relationship that is much more than business. She is one of the few who is slowly, however briefly, incorporated into Vic's very private life and proves to be one of the few people our PI has a soft spot for.
- Andrew McGraw- Anita's father and leader of the Knifegrinders, he was the one who pose as Mr. Thayer and knew about Peter being dead. He ends up attempting to throw Warshawski off the case in order to protect his daughter from the people who want her for information she has about Ajax's insurance fraud. Because of his involvement in the labor union and Knifegrinders, Anita partially holds him responsible for Peter's death and the turmoil it caused in her life, both personal and legal.
- Earl Smeissen- Tries to get Warshawki off the case by threatening her and having her beat up. He is in charge of drugs, prostitution, and scams businesses in the town.
- Tony – one of Earl's henchmen who essentially does all the dirty work for him. Becomes too noticeable with the Z scar across his face.
- Mrs. Thayer- Wife of John Thayer and mother of Peter, Jill, and Susan.
- Jack Thornsdale- Son-in-law of Mr. Thayer and husband of Jill's older sister, Susan.
- Susan Thornsdale- Older sister of Jill and Peter, also is married to Jack. Both she and her husband seem to only care what people think about them.
- Carol- Lotty's nurse at her clinic. She watches Jill while Vic and Lotty are away.
- Murray Ryerson- Crime reporter who works for the Herald-Star.
