= Martin Roche–John Tait House =

Historic house in Illinois, United States

- U.S. National Register of Historic Places
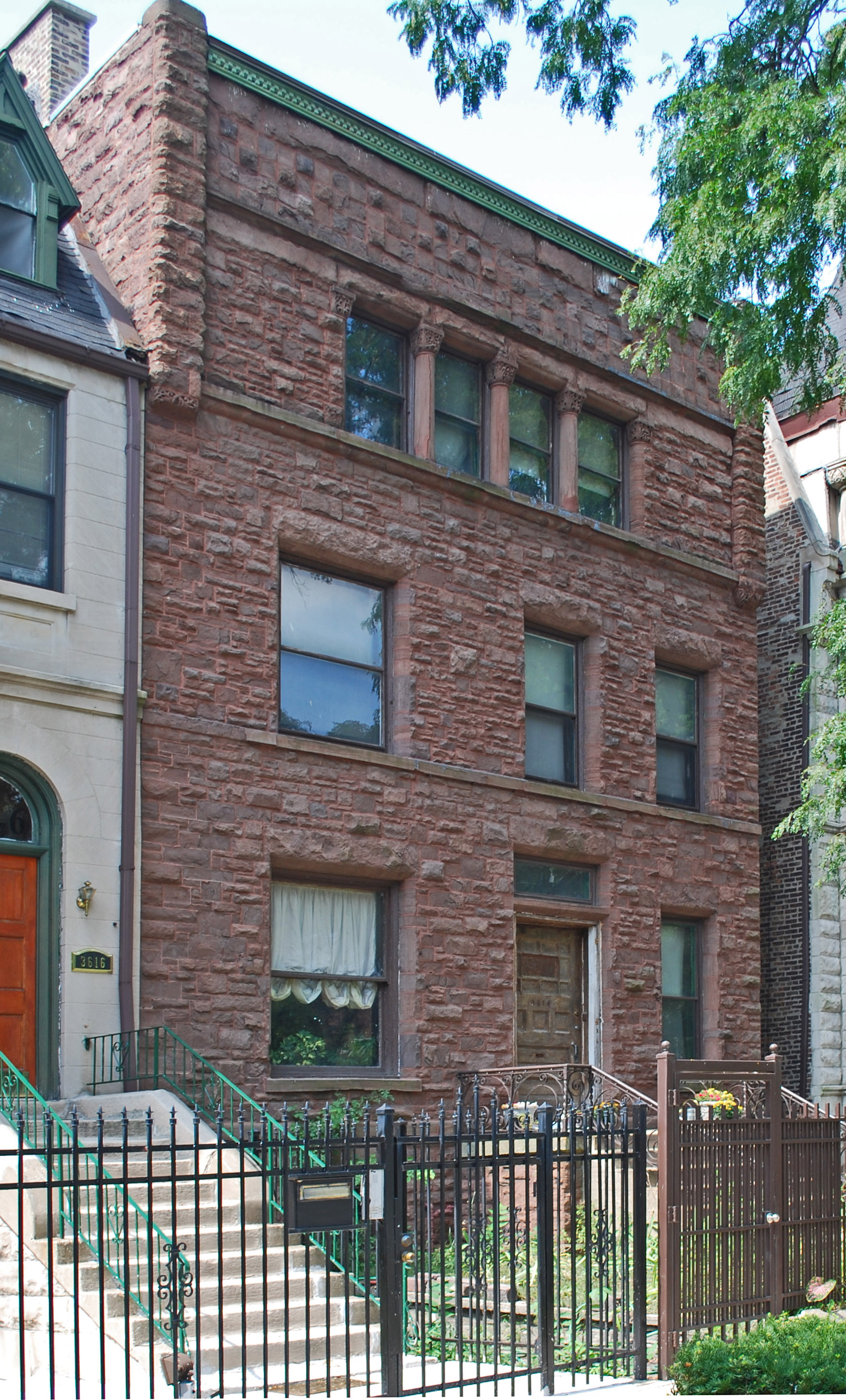

- Location within Illinois Location within the United States
- Location: 3614 S. Martin Luther King Dr., Chicago, Illinois
- Coordinates: 41°49′46″N 87°37′4″W
- Area: less than one acre
- Built: 1888
- Architect: Holabird & Roche
- Architectural style: Romanesque
- NRHP reference No.: 00001338
- Added to NRHP: November 8, 2000

The Martin Roche–John Tait House is a historic house located at 3614 S. Martin Luther King Drive in the Douglas community area of Chicago, Illinois. The house was the home of architect Martin Roche, half of prominent Chicago architectural firm Holabird & Roche, from 1888 until 1917. Roche designed the house for his sister Bridget Louise and brother-in-law John Tait; as he was unmarried and consequently a key part of their family, Roche moved into a third-floor suite to live with the couple. He gave the house a Romanesque design; the design has similarities with his work at Fort Sheridan at the time, though the Fort Sheridan homes are less plain. The flat, rough-coursed sandstone front facade of the house is a sharp contrast to the surrounding homes, many of which are Queen Anne designs with extensive detail work.

The house was added to the National Register of Historic Places on November 8, 2000.
