= Deadlock (novel) =

1984 novel by Sara Paretsky

- First edition
- Language: English
- Series: V. I. Warshawski
- Genre: Crime fiction
- Publisher: Dial Press
- Publication date: 1984
- Pages: 252
- ISBN: 0-385-27933-7

Deadlock is a detective novel by Sara Paretsky told in the first person by private eye (Vic) V. I. Warshawski.

== Plot ==
Vic goes to the Chicago port to find out about the death of her cousin Boom Boom. The police believe that this ex-Black Hawks hockey player died in an accident, but Vic believes that Boom Boom was killed. Vic starts digging for motive and evidence. After two attempts on her life, she finally thinks she has the murder solved but needs strong evidence. To get it, she goes to the yacht of a shipping magnate but is caught by the magnate while she is gathering evidence against him. He confronts her and tells her she is going to die.

== Film ==
The book is the basis of the 1991 film V.I. Warshawski, starring Kathleen Turner.

== Awards ==
The author was given an award by the Friends of American Writers for the book.
