= Red Hot Patriot: The Kick-Ass Wit of Molly Ivins =

Play by Margaret and Allison Engel

- Written by: Margaret Engel; Allison Engel
- Characters: Molly Ivins
- Genre: Comedy, biography
- Setting: Texas, United States

Premiere
- Date: 2010
- Place: Philadelphia Theater Company

Red Hot Patriot: The Kick-Ass Wit of Molly Ivins is a 2010 play written by twin sisters Margaret Engel and Allison Engel.

Kathleen Turner portrayed Ivins in the play's 2010 debut, the play was directed by David Esbjornson.

== Overview ==
A one-actor play based on the life of Texas political writer Molly Ivins.
