= Lynnie Godfrey =

American actress and singer

Caroline “Lynnie” Godfrey (born 1952) is an American actress, singer, author, director and producer.

== Early life ==
Lynnie Godfrey was born in 1952 in New York City. She began performing as a child, singing with her mother and family members in Pentecostal churches in Harlem and Brooklyn.

As a child, Godfrey attended The Modern School, a private school for black children in Harlem (Sugar Hill). It was founded by Mildred Johnson, whose uncle, James Weldon Johnson, wrote the Negro National Anthem, “Lift Every Voice and Sing.” Godfrey later attended George Washington High School in Washington Heights, whose alumni include, Harry Belafonte, Henry Kissinger and Ron Perlman. Godfrey also studied voice with Dr. Chauncy Northern, one of the first black opera singers to perform on the Italian stage at the Northern Vocal Arts School at Carnegie Hall.

Godfrey attended Northern’s alma mater, Hampton University for a year. Returning to New York City's Hunter College, she studied with Lloyd Richards and began auditioning.

== Career ==
After graduating from college, Godfrey performed in both theatre productions and nightclubs, including the new Cotton Club. She appeared as Elaine in Christopher Durang’s “The Nature and Purpose of the Universe” and appeared in the title role of “Mama Liberty’s Bicentennial Party” for Theatre for the New City, a street theatre performance for children.

In February 1978, Godfrey appeared in a new musical showcase: “Shuffle Along” with Dabriah Chapman, Vernon Spencer and Roger Lawson, which led to a new musical revue, “Eubie!.” Based on the life and work of Eubie Blake, who, along with collaborator, Noble Sissle, created “Shuffle Along,” one of the first Broadway musicals written and directed by African Americans. The show moved to Broadway in September 1978 and Godfrey was cast to perform several Eubie Blake songs, including “Daddy, Won’t You Please Come Home?” and “I’m Cravin’ for That Kind of Love”; along with “I’m Just Wild About Harry.” She was nominated for a Drama Desk Award for her Broadway debut. The show’s original cast includes: Gregory Hines, Maurice Hines, Alaina Reed, Janet Powell, Marion Ramsey, Ethel Beatty, Terry Burrell, Leslie Dockery, Lonnie McNeil, Jeffery V. Thompson, Melvin Johnson Jr.

A member of Negro Actors Guild of America (NAG), Godfrey also appeared in film and television, including 704 Hauser, a Norman Lear sitcom, created as an African American spinoff to All in the Family.

Godfrey has also originated several theatre roles, including The Snow Queen, which she continues to perform today. One of the first women of color to be cast in famous musical roles, these include Lola in Damn Yankees and Jenny Diver in Three Penny Opera.

In 2002, Godfrey founded Godlee Entertainment, a production company committed to nurturing emerging playwrights and producing new work. As Producing Artistic Director, she also oversees “The Essence of Acting,” a New York City-based acting group, created to encourage aspiring African American actors. Most recently, she has been directing, producing and performing in a new play, “Greenwood: An American Dream Destroyed,” by Celeste Bedford Walker. The play chronicles the rise and fall of Greenwood, a black community in Tulsa, Oklahoma. Known in the 1920s as “Negro Wall Street,” Greenwood was a prosperous community, destroyed over two days in 1921, when a white mob burned it to the ground. Godfrey has produced the play at the New York Theatre Workshop, University of Delaware, Theatre Institute at Sage in Troy, NY and ArtsQuest, in Bethlehem, Pennsylvania.

In 2023, she became the president of the League of Professional Theatre Women, a multidiscliplinary membership organization for professional theater women working in the theater.

== Awards and honors ==
- Drama Desk Nomination – Best Supporting Actress in a Musical
- NAACP Image Awards – Best Supporting Actress in a Play
- Audelco Awards - Best Supporting Actress in a Musical
- Dramalogue Theatre Awards – Outstanding Achievement in Theatre Performance
- NAACP Image Awards – Best Producer
- Tyrone Guthrie Award – Excellence in the Area of Directing

== Personal ==
Married to Carl Lee in 1979. They were introduced by Gregory Hines, who served as best man at their wedding.

== Professional work ==
=== Theatre ===
- Eubie! Musical Revue, Ambassador Theatre (Broadway debut)
- Shuffle Along – Theatre-Off-Park
- Snow Queen, Prince Music Theatre, New York State Theatre Institute, Unicorn Theatre, West End London, England (Originated role)
- ’39 (Pre-Broadway Production)
- Ain’t Misbehavin’ – Pennsylvania Stage Company, Woodstock Playhouse, Theatre-by-the-Sea
- Greenwood: An American Dream Destroyed, New York Theatre Workshop
- The Dispute, Shakespeare Theatre Company
- Let My People Go, Narrator/ Harriet Tubman, Kennedy Center
- Gem of the Ocean – Aunt Esther, Arena Stage
- Millennium 7 - Naomi Pilgrim, 78th Street Theatre Lab
- Wild Christmas Binge – Ghost, Arena Stage
- Night Life, Musical Revue, West Beth Theatre
- L’histoire Du Soldat, Red Cross Girl, Bay Street Theatre
- A, My Name is Alice, Lynnie, American Place Theatre (Original Cast)
- No Place to Be Somebody, Cora Mae Beasley, Matrix Theatre
- Ragtime Blues, Belle, Amas Repertory Theatre
- Sweet Charity, Helene, Starlight Theatre
- Damn Yankees, Lola, Hartford Stage Company
- Ain’t Misbehavin,’ Nell/Armelia, Regional Tour
- Three Penny Opera, Jenny Diver, Empire State Institute for the Performing Arts
- The Desert Song, Azuri, Pittsburgh Civic Light Opera
- Juice Problem, Vicky, O’Neill Playwright’s Conference
- Absurdities, Josephine Baker, European Tour
- The Nature & Purpose of the Universe, Elaine, Direct Theatre, Theatre for a New City
- 1,000 Years of Jazz, Musical Revue, LA Music Theatre, National Tour
- If This Ain’t It, Musical Revue, WPA Theatre

=== Television ===
- 704 Hauser
- Civil Wars
- Brewster Place
- LA Law
- Amen
- 227
- thirtysomething
- Cop Rock
- Frank’s Place
- New Monkees
- Living Dolls
- Eubie (Showtime)
- Memories of Eubie (PBS)

=== Film ===
- V.I. Warshawski (Disney Films)
- Women Without Implants (Independent)
- Enemy Territory (Independent)

=== Vocalist ===
- Original Broadway Cast Album of EUBIE !! (Warner Bros.)
- Lynnie Godfrey: Doin’ It Her Way (CD)
- Spending the Holidays with Lynnie Godfrey (CD)
- Ladies of Song: A Tribute to Ethel Waters, Ella Fitzgerald and Sarah Vaughn (Theatre/Cabaret)

=== Director ===
- To Be Young, Gifted and Black, Theatre-Off Park
- Waves of America, Empire State Institute of Performing Arts
- Unentitled, ArtsQuest, Bethlehem PA
- Lois’s Wedding, Arts Quest, Bethlehem, PA
- Red Blood of War and Legacy, Bethlehem, PA
- Greenwood: An American Dream Destroyed, New York Theatre Workshop, University of Delaware, Theatre Institute at Sage, Troy, NY.

=== Author ===
- Sharing Lessons Learned While Seeking the Spotlight, by Lynnie Godfrey, Blue Heron Book Works, 2016
