= Molly Ivins =

American newspaper columnist (1944–2007)

- Born: August 30, 1944; Monterey, California, U.S.
- Died: January 31, 2007 (aged 62); Austin, Texas, U.S.
- Education: Smith College; Columbia Graduate School of Journalism
- Occupations: Columnist; commentator; author
- Writing career
- Period: 1967–2007
- Subjects: American politics; Texas politics; current affairs

Mary Tyler "Molly" Ivins (August 30, 1944 – January 31, 2007) was an American newspaper columnist, author, and political commentator, known for her trenchant wit and satirical critiques of political figures.

Born in California and raised in Texas, Ivins attended Smith College and the Columbia University Graduate School of Journalism. She began her journalism career at the Minneapolis Tribune where she became the first female police reporter at the paper. Ivins joined The Texas Observer in the early 1970s and later moved to The New York Times. She became a columnist for the Dallas Times Herald in the 1980s, and then the Fort Worth Star-Telegram after the Times Herald was sold and shuttered in 1991. Her column was subsequently syndicated by Creators Syndicate and carried by hundreds of newspapers.

A biography of Ivins, Molly Ivins: A Rebel Life, was co-written in 2010 by PEN-USA winning presidential biographer Bill Minutaglio and W. Michael Smith. The Forbes Media Guide Five Hundred, 1994 said:

Ivins's pithy assessments of politics and life at large crackle with broad Texas humor. Combining her talent for culling information with her razor-sharp wit, she throws a powerful knockout punch. ... Whether one agrees with her or not, Ivins's pen pierces both the brain and the funny bone.

== Early life ==
Ivins was born in Monterey, California, and raised in Houston, Texas. Her father, James Ivins, known as "General Jim" because of his rigid authoritarianism (or sometimes "Admiral Jim" for his love of sailing), was an oil and gas executive, and the family lived in Houston's affluent River Oaks neighborhood. Ivins graduated from St. John's School in 1962. In high school, she was active in extracurricular activities, including the yearbook staff. She had her first pieces of journalism published in The Review, the official student newspaper of St. John's School, though she never wrote any of the political columns that would become her specialty later in life. Ivins later became co-editor of the arts and culture section of the student paper. In addition, she frequently participated in theater productions and earned a lifetime membership in Johnnycake, the drama club.

Ivins enrolled in Scripps College in 1962, but was not happy there, and transferred to Smith College in 1963. During that time, she became romantically involved with Henry "Hank" Holland Jr., a family friend and student at Yale whom she referred to as "the love of my life". After he was killed in a motorcycle accident in 1964, her friends would later say that she never seemed to find anyone else who could replace his memory. Some say that is why she never married. She spent her junior year at the Institute of Political Science in Paris and received a Bachelor of Arts degree in history in 1966. She earned a master's degree from Columbia University's School of Journalism in 1967.

== Career ==
While at Smith, Ivins spent three summers as an intern at the Houston Chronicle. Her jobs there included the complaint department as well as "sewer editor", as she put it, responsible for reporting on the nuts and bolts of local city life. After graduating from Columbia, she took a job in the Twin Cities at the Minneapolis Tribune, where she covered "militant blacks, angry Indians, radical students, uppity women and a motley assortment of other misfits and troublemakers".

In 1970 Ivins left the Tribune for the city of Austin, Texas, hired by Ronnie Dugger, to be the co-editor and political reporter for The Texas Observer. She covered the Texas Legislature and befriended folklorist John Henry Faulk, Secretary of State Bob Bullock and future Governor Ann Richards, among others. She also gained increasing national attention through op-ed and feature stories in The New York Times and The Washington Post along with a busy speaking schedule inside and outside Texas. The Times, concerned that its prevailing writing style was too staid and lifeless, hired her away from the Observer in 1976, and she wrote for the Times until 1982. During her run there, Ivins became Rocky Mountain bureau chief, covering nine western states, although she was known to say she was named chief because there was no one else in the bureau.

Ivins also wrote the obituary for Elvis Presley in The New York Times for the August 17, 1977, edition. Generally, her more colorful writing style clashed with the editors' expectations, and in 1980, after she wrote about a "community chicken-killing festival" in New Mexico and called it a "gang-pluck", she was recalled to New York City as punishment. When Abe Rosenthal, editor of the Times, accused her of trying to inspire readers to think "dirty thoughts" with these words, her response was, "Damn if I could fool you, Mr. Rosenthal." In late 1981, after receiving an offer from the Dallas Times Herald to write a column about anything she liked, Ivins left New York City for Dallas.

Ivins wrote for the Dallas Times Herald for ten years and was nominated for the Pulitzer Prize twice. By 1985 the editors had moved her to the paper's Austin bureau to reduce friction with Dallas city leaders. Her freelance work and speaking engagements continued to grow, and she hired Elizabeth Faulk, John Henry Faulk's widow, as a personal assistant. In 1991, her book Molly Ivins Can't Say That, Can She? was published, and spent 29 weeks on the New York Times bestseller list. Also in 1991, rival newspaper The Dallas Morning News bought the Times Herald and closed it down. The Fort Worth Star-Telegram immediately made Ivins an offer and said she could stay in Austin. Ivins accepted, and wrote a column for the Fort Worth paper from 1992 until 2001, when she became an independent journalist. Her column, syndicated by Creators Syndicate, eventually appeared in nearly 400 newspapers nationwide. Ivins also remained a board member and contributor to the Texas Democracy Foundation, which publishes the Texas Observer in Austin.

She also wrote for the Progressive, the Nation, Newsweek, Mother Jones, McCall's and Playboy. She has appeared on Nightline, PBS's MacNeil/Lehrer News Hour, National Public Radio's All Things Considered and Talk of the Nation.

== Plagiarism allegations ==
In 1995, humorist Florence King wrote an article in The American Enterprise claiming that Ivins had plagiarized King's work in a 1988 Mother Jones article. Like Ivins, King—who was referred to as the "Queen of Mean" by National Review, which published her columns—pulled no punches in her writing. David Rubien, writing in Salon, described the incident: "In a 1995 article for Mother Jones on Southern manners and mores, she extensively quoted, with affectionate attribution, statements from Florence King's book Southern Ladies and Gentlemen. But for some careless reason Ivins still fails to comprehend, she left the attribution off a few King statements." Ivins had also included her own words in a quotation she attributed to King. Ivins wrote a letter of apology to King, but characteristically ended it with: "As for the rest of your observations about me and my work ..., boy you really are a mean bitch, aren't you? Sincerely, Molly Ivins, plagiarist." The American Enterprise published Ivins's apology and King's reply in a later issue.

== Health issues ==
For more than three decades, Ivins struggled with alcoholism, described in her The Nation obituary as an "occupational hazard" of journalism. In her notebooks, she wrote of her struggles, "I should like to think the biggest mistake I have made in the first 30 years of my life was to start drinking and keep drinking" and "I have wasted so much time by getting drunk ... I have jeopardized my job from drinking and failed in my responsibilities as a journalist."

Late in her life, she took some steps to treat the condition, spending some time at what she called "drunk school", then attending Alcoholics Anonymous (AA) meetings for the last year-and-a-half of her life.

In 1999, Ivins was diagnosed with stage III inflammatory breast cancer. The cancer recurred in 2003 and again in late 2005. In January 2006, she reported that she was again undergoing chemotherapy. In December 2006, she took leave from her column to again undergo treatment. She wrote two columns in January 2007 but returned to the hospital on January 26 for further treatment.

== Death ==
Ivins died at her Austin, Texas, home in hospice care on January 31, 2007, at age 62.

After her death, George W. Bush, a frequent target of her barbs, said in a statement, "I respected her convictions, her passionate belief in the power of words. She fought her illness with that same passion. Her quick wit and commitment will be missed."

The Molly Ivins Papers are at the Dolph Briscoe Center for American History, while her personal library was donated to the Witliff Collections at Texas State University.

From August 23 to October 28, 2012, actress Kathleen Turner portrayed Molly Ivins in the play Red Hot Patriot: The Kick-Ass Wit of Molly Ivins by twin sisters and journalists Margaret and Allison Engel at Arena Stage in Washington, D.C., and at the Berkeley Repertory Theatre in Berkeley, California. Janice Engel (no relation) produced and directed a documentary, "Raise Hell: The Life & Times of Molly Ivins," inspired by the play.

== Beliefs ==
Writing from an unabashedly populist perspective, Ivins repeatedly described herself as a populist and, on some occasions, as a left-libertarian. Ivins peppered her columns with colorful phrases to create the "feel" of Texas. Her writings often employ irony and satirical humor to make a very serious point. For example, in her 1993 essay "Taking a Stab at Our Infatuation with Guns", she begins by saying:

Let me start this discussion by pointing out that I am not anti-gun. I'm pro-knife. Consider the merits of the knife.

In the first place, you have to catch up with someone in order to stab him. A general substitution of knives for guns would promote physical fitness. We'd turn into a whole nation of great runners. Plus, knives don't ricochet. And people are seldom killed while cleaning their knives.

As a civil libertarian, I of course support the Second Amendment. And I believe it means exactly what it says: "A well-regulated militia being necessary to the security of a free state, the right of the people to keep and bear arms shall not be infringed." Fourteen-year-old boys are not part of a well-regulated militia. Members of wacky religious cults are not part of a well-regulated militia. Permitting unregulated citizens to have guns is destroying the security of this free state.

I am intrigued by the arguments of those who claim to follow the judicial doctrine of original intent. How do they know it was the dearest wish of Thomas Jefferson's heart that teen-age drug dealers should cruise the cities of this nation perforating their fellow citizens with assault rifles? Channelling?

When outraged by instances of what she considered malfeasance or stupidity on the part of public officials, she couched her argument in an air of stunned amusement. She enjoyed telling stories about the Texas Legislature, which she simply called "The Lege", calling it one of the most corrupt and incompetent, and funniest governing bodies in the nation. For example:

Practice, practice, practice, that's what Texas provides when it comes to sleaze and stink. Who can forget such great explanations as "Well, I'll just make a little bit of money, I won't make a whole lot"? And "There was never a Bible in the room"?

In 2003, she coined the term "Great Liberal Backlash of 2003", and was a passionate critic of the 2003 Iraq War. She is also credited with applying the nicknames "Shrub" and "Dubya" to George W. Bush. Ivins supported affirmative action and denounced President Bush for choosing Martin Luther King Jr.'s birthday to announce his opposition to the use of racial quotas at the University of Michigan.

== Quotations ==
Notable quotes attributed to Ivins include:

- "Politics is not a picture on a wall or a television sitcom that you can decide you don’t much care for… politics is not about those people in Washington, those people in your state capitol… this country is run by us, it is our deal, we run this country, we are the board of directors, we own it, they are just the people we’ve hired to drive the bus for a while."
- On the subject of Pat Buchanan's combative Culture War Speech at the 1992 Republican Convention, which attracted controversy over Buchanan's aggressive rhetoric against Bill Clinton, liberals, supporters of abortion and gay rights, and for his comparison of American politics to religious warfare, Ivins quipped that the speech had "probably sounded better in the original German".
- "We are the people who run this country. We are the deciders. And every single day, every single one of us needs to step outside and take some action to help stop this war. ... We need people in the streets, banging pots and pans and demanding, 'Stop it, now!'" (from her last column)
- "Having breast cancer is massive amounts of no fun. First they mutilate you; then they poison you; then they burn you. I have been on blind dates better than that."
- "So keep fightin' for freedom and justice, beloveds, but don't you forget to have fun doin' it. Lord, let your laughter ring forth. Be outrageous, ridicule the fraidy-cats, rejoice in all the oddities that freedom can produce. And when you get through kickin' ass and celebratin' the sheer joy of a good fight, be sure to tell those who come after how much fun it was."—quoted by John Nichols for The Nation Original source: "The Fun's in the Fight" column for Mother Jones, 1993. Part of the original quote is currently posted in The Daily Beast offices.
- On Bill Clinton: "If left to my own devices, I'd spend all my time pointing out that he's weaker than bus-station chili. But the man is so constantly subjected to such hideous and unfair abuse that I wind up standing up for him on the general principle that some fairness should be applied. Besides, no one but a fool or a Republican ever took him for a liberal." (Introduction to You Got to Dance With Them What Brung You)
- On James M. Collins, U.S. Representative, R-Dallas: "If his IQ slips any lower we'll have to water him twice a day." Collins had said that the current energy crisis could be averted if "we didn't use all that gas on school busing." Ivins's quote engendered substantial controversy, with calls and letters pouring into her newspaper, The Dallas Times Herald. The newspaper turned the controversy into a publicity campaign, with billboards all over the city asking, "Molly Ivins Can't Say That, Can She?"—which she later employed as the title for her first book.
- "Of Bush's credentials as an economic conservative, there is no question at all—he owes his political life to big corporate money; he's a CEO's wet dream. He carries their water, he's stumpbroke—however you put it, George W. Bush is a wholly owned subsidiary of corporate America. ... We can find no evidence that it has ever occurred to him to question whether it is wise to do what big business wants."

== Awards ==
- William Allen White Award from the University of Kansas (2001)
- Smith Medal from Smith College (2001)
- Elected to the American Academy of Arts and Sciences (2001)
- Ivan Allen Jr. Prize for Progress and Service (2003)
- Pringle Prize for Washington Journalism from Columbia University (2003)
- Eugene V. Debs Award in the field of journalism (2003)
- David Brower Award for journalism from the Sierra Club (2004)
- David Nyhan Prize for Political Journalism from the Shorenstein Center on Media, Politics and Public Policy at Harvard University (2006)
- The MOLLY National Journalism Prize from the Texas Democracy Foundation (2006)
- Otis Social Justice Award from Wheaton College, MA (2004)

In addition to these formal awards, Ivins said that she was particularly proud of two distinct honors—having the Minneapolis police force's mascot pig named after her, and being banned from the Texas A&M campus.

== Works ==
=== Newspaper articles ===
- Molly Ivins at the Texas Observer, from 1970 through 1976; and syndicated columns
- Selected Articles by Molly Ivins, The New York Times (1977–1980)
- "By Molly Ivins" site:washingtonpost.com (1981–2007)
- Molly Ivins (1994–1996)
- Molly Ivins column archive at Creators Syndicate

- Molly Ivins tribute, written by her long-time editor Anthony Zurcher.

- Molly Ivins @ motherjones.com
- Molly Ivins @ truthdig.com 2006
- Stories by Molly Ivins at AlterNet

=== Books ===
Books by Molly Ivins, in chronological order:

- The Edge of the West and Other Texas Stories by Bryan Wooley, introduction by Molly Ivins (Texas Western Pr, 1987) ISBN 0-87404-214-3
- Molly Ivins Can't Say That, Can She? (Random House, 1991) ISBN 0-679-40445-7
- Nothin' But Good Times Ahead (Random House, 1993) ISBN 0-517-16429-9
- You Got to Dance With Them What Brung You: Politics in the Clinton Years (Random House, 1998) ISBN 0-679-40446-5
- Shrub: The Short But Happy Political Life of George W. Bush with Lou Dubose (Random House, 2000) ISBN 0-375-50399-4
- The Betrayal of America: How the Supreme Court Undermined the Constitution and Chose Our President (2001) with Vincent Bugliosi (Thunder's Mouth Press, 2001) ISBN 1-56025-355-X
- Sugar's Life in the Hood: The Story of a Former Welfare Mother by Sugar Turner and Tracy Bachrach Ehlers, foreword by Molly Ivins (University of Texas Press, 2002) ISBN 0-292-72102-1
- Pipe Dreams: Greed, Ego, and the Death of Enron by Robert Bryce, foreword by Molly Ivins (PublicAffairs, 2002) ISBN 1-58648-138-X
- Bushwhacked: Life in George W. Bush's America with Lou Dubose (Random House, 2003) ISBN 0-375-50752-3
- Who Let the Dogs In?: Incredible Political Animals I Have Known (Random House, 2004) ISBN 1-4000-6285-3
- Bill of Wrongs: The Executive Branch's Assault on America's Fundamental Rights (Random House, 2007) ISBN 1-4000-6286-1

== Selected C-SPAN interviews ==
(Source)

External videos
- Booknotes interview with Ivins on You Got to Dance with Them What Brung You, April 26, 1998, C-SPAN
- Washington Journal interview with Ivins on You Got to Dance with Them What Brung You, April 15, 1999, C-SPAN
- Washington Journal interview with Ivins on Who Let the Dogs In?, July 15, 2004, C-SPAN
- Presentation by Ivins on Bushwhacked, October 2, 2004, C-SPAN

== Biographical documentary ==
In 2019 a documentary called Raise Hell: The Life and times of Molly Ivins was released.

== Legacy ==
The MOLLY National Journalism Prize honors Molly Ivins' legacy.

Ivins is the subject of a one-woman play, Red Hot Patriot: The Kick Ass Wit of Molly Ivins, written by twin-sister journalists, Alison and Margaret Engels.

== Notes ==
- Ivins, Molly. "Bush-hater strikes again". The Free Press. October 16, 2003.
- Ivins, Molly. "There Goes the Electrical Grid". AlterNet. July 12, 2005.
- Ivins, Molly. "Who Needs Breasts, Anyway?" Time Magazine. February 18, 2002.
- Robert Siegel and Wade Goodwyn, "Molly Ivins Dies at 62 After Bout with Breast Cancer", including interviews with and commentaries by Ivins, NPR, January 31, 2007.
