= Blood Shot (novel) =

1988 novel by Sara Paretsky

- First edition
- Author: Sara Paretsky
- Original title: Toxic Shock United Kingdom
- Series: V.I. Warshawski series
- Genre: Mystery
- Publisher: Delacorte Press
- Publication date: 1988
- ISBN: 0440204208
- OCLC: 476821113
- Preceded by: Bitter Medicine (1987)
- Followed by: Burn Marks (1990)

Blood Shot (marketed under the title Toxic Shock in the United Kingdom), published in New York in 1988, is the fifth in a series of novels by Sara Paretsky featuring her character V. I. Warshawski, a hard-boiled female private investigator. The novel was nominated for the 1989 Anthony Award in the "Best Novel" category.

== Plot ==
V.I. Warshawski isn't crazy about going back to her old South Chicago neighborhood, but she's never been a woman who breaks a promise. Returning to her old neighborhood for a school reunion, she finds herself agreeing to search for a childhood friend's missing father, a man her friend never knew and about whom her friend's dying mother will not speak. What ought to have been a routine missing-persons case rapidly turns up a homicide; and Warshawski must battle corrupt local politicians and businessmen, who do all they can to derail her investigation.
