= 704 Hauser =

- Genre: Sitcom
- Created by: Norman Lear
- Directed by: Jack Shea; Norman Lear (pilot)
- Starring: John Amos; Lynnie Godfrey; T.E. Russell; Maura Tierney
- Country of origin: United States
- Original language: English
- No. of seasons: 1
- No. of episodes: 6 (1 unaired)

Production
- Camera setup: Multi-camera
- Running time: 22–24 minutes
- Production companies: ELP Communications; Act III Television; Castle Rock Entertainment; Columbia Pictures Television

Original release
- Network: CBS
- Release: April 11 – May 9, 1994

Related
- All in the Family; Archie Bunker's Place; Maude; The Jeffersons; Gloria; Good Times; Checking In

704 Hauser is an American sitcom television series and a spin-off of All in the Family (the final of several) that aired on CBS from April 11 to May 9, 1994. The series is built around the concept of a black family, the Cumberbatch Family, moving into the former Queens home of Archie Bunker after Bunker had sold the house located at 704 Hauser Street.

== Overview ==
Norman Lear created the series during the time when conservative talk radio was becoming more popular in the United States, particularly in the form of Rush Limbaugh. Lear felt that the time was right for a new show to explore new issues, making 704 Hauser even more explicitly political than All in the Family. John Amos, a veteran of the earlier Lear sitcom Good Times (itself a spin-off of the All in the Family spin-off Maude), starred as Ernie Cumberbatch, while Lynnie Godfrey played his wife, Rose. The show features a reversal of the original All in the Family formula. Ernie and Rose Cumberbatch are working class Democrats, while their son Goodie is a conservative activist and his girlfriend, Cherlyn Markowitz (Maura Tierney), is white and Jewish.

The show attracted middling ratings, and was canceled after five episodes (with one episode remaining unaired).

In his memoir Even This I Get To Experience, Norman Lear alleged that Rush Limbaugh "was an expected fan and had me on his show to promote" 704 Hauser. However, contrary to Lear's claim, there is no record of him ever appearing on either the radio or television versions of The Rush Limbaugh Show.

== Cast ==
- John Amos as Ernie Cumberbatch
- Lynnie Godfrey as Rose Cumberbatch
- T.E. Russell as Thurgood Marshall 'Goodie' Cumberbatch
- Maura Tierney as Cherlyn Markowitz

Casey Siemaszko plays Joey Stivic, Archie's grandson, in the first episode. CBS anchor Bob Schieffer appears in the first episode as himself.

== List of episodes ==
| No. | Title | Directed by | Written by | Original release date | Prod. code | Viewers (millions) |
|---|---|---|---|---|---|---|
| 1 | "Meet the Cumberbatchs" | Norman Lear | Story by : Norman Lear; Teleplay by : Norman Lear and Kevin Heelan | April 11, 1994 | 001 | 16.8 |
A pair of liberal black parents struggles with their conservative son and his white girlfriend.
| 2 | "Here's Why Ernie Should Never Be Left Home Alone" | Jack Shea | John Baskin and Roger Shulman | April 18, 1994 | 003 | 15.2 |
Ernie conspires to find Goodie a new girlfriend.
| 3 | "Ernie Live on Tape" | Jack Shea | Janet Lynne Jackson | April 25, 1994 | 005 | 13.5 |
Ernie and Goodie disagree over an incident of alleged racial harassment.
| 4 | "Triskaidekaphobia" | Jack Shea | Greg Cope and Sean Dwyer | May 2, 1994 | 006 | 13.2 |
Friday the 13th brings bad luck to the Cumberbatchs.
| 5 | "All That Jasmine" | Jack Shea | Andrea Allen-Wiley | May 9, 1994 | 004 | 13.7 |
Rose's sister interferes with Ernie's birthday surprise.
| 6 | "Revelations" | Jack Shea | Walter Allen Bennett, Jr. | Unaired | 002 | N/A |
Ernie discovers a master plan to reduce his taxes by becoming a minister.

== Home media ==
The pilot episode, "Meet the Cumberbatchs", was included as a bonus feature on the All in the Family: The Complete Series DVD box set released by Shout! Factory on October 30, 2012.
