= V. I. Warshawski =

Fictional private investigator from Chicago

- Warshawski, as depicted by illustrator for the cover of short-story collection V.I For Short
- First appearance: Indemnity Only (1982)
- Created by: Sara Paretsky
- Portrayed by: Kathleen Turner (Film, BBC Radio); Sharon Gless (BBC Radio)

In-universe information
- Alias: Victoria Iphigenia Warshawski
- Gender: Female
- Occupation: Private investigator
- Family: Anton "Tony" Warshawski (father); Gabriella Sestrieri (mother)
- Spouse: Dick Yarborough (ex-husband)
- Nationality: American

Victoria Iphigenia "Vic" "V. I." Warshawski is a fictional private investigator from Chicago who is the protagonist featured in a series of detective novels and short stories written by Chicago author Sara Paretsky.

With the exception of "The Pietro Andromache", Warshawski's adventures are written in the first person.

== Biography ==
Victoria Iphigenia Warshawski, called "Vic" by her friends, is the daughter of Italian-born Gabriella Sestrieri, who was half-Jewish and fled the Mussolini regime in 1941. Trained as an opera singer, she was destitute when she arrived as a refugee immigrant. She met and married Anton "Tony" Warshawski, a Polish American police officer in Chicago. Gabriella spoke Italian and heavily accented English with her daughter, who became fluent in Italian. On the other hand, the American-born Tony spoke only English with her, and she picked up only a few words of Polish from her paternal grandmother.

Gabriella died of cancer when Vic was in high school; Tony died ten years later in 1976, suggesting that Vic was born about 1950. Blood Shot (published as "Toxic Shock" in the UK) refers to Vic having last been to her high school some 20 years previously, making the setting of this story 1988, the year of the book’s publication. In an interview, Sara Paretsky noted that she has portrayed Warshawski ageing in real time. However, in the 2010 "Hardball", Paretsky moved Warshawski's birth upwards to 1957, presumably since a 1950 birth would make her sixty years old in 2010, a bit too old for intensive physical activity. The change involved a considerably detailed retconning and re-writing many events of Warshawski's childhood to fit with the new chronology. In a note at the end of Pay Dirt (2024), Paretsky comments that Warshawski ages more slowly than the author does, with the detective only being around 50 years old rather than Paretsky's "seventysomething."

Vic grew up on the southeast side of Chicago, in the shadow of shuttered steel mills and factories. Together with her cousin Boom-Boom, she had many wild and dangerous adventures – becoming especially wild and reckless in the period of deep grief after her mother's death. She learned techniques of street-fighting that were useful in her later career. She was involved in the girls' basketball team in her school, called "The Lady Tigers", and entered the University of Chicago on a sports scholarship. During her university years, she became deeply involved in the counter-culture of the 1960s, taking part in the Freedom Rides to rural Louisiana, traveling hundreds of miles to attend rallies addressed by Martin Luther King Jr., demonstrating against the Vietnam War, and taking part in an underground abortion service. In the latter context, she first met Dr. Lotty Herschel, another major character, who becomes an important lifelong contact. However, as the daughter of a police officer whom she greatly loved and respected, Vic strongly objects to radicals calling the police "pigs".

After earning a law degree and working a short stint as a public defender, she became a private detective specializing in white-collar crime. She married fellow law student Dick Yarborough, but they divorced after two years. He became a corporate lawyer and their outlooks strongly differed. She has no children, but in many cases acts in a maternal manner towards teenagers neglected or abused by their parents.

Vic's clients fall into two distinct categories. There are the "bread and butter" clients who offer her fairly routine private detective jobs, which usually do not carry too much personal risk, and who pay promptly her full rates. It is these who provide her livelihood, but what she does for them is hardly ever described in any detail. The adventures in the books almost invariably concern the other kind of client - who can't afford to pay her full rates, or can't pay her at all, but she decides to take their cases anyway because of some intrinsic detail arousing her feeling of justice. She can persist in an investigation even when the client who originated it asks her to stop or is dead, and sometimes she starts an investigation on her own without a client at all. Sometimes at the end of such a case somebody who benefited from her efforts - not necessarily the original client - volunteers to pay her. But such luck cannot be relied on. At the end of several books Vic ends up - after having spent much time, effort, and money from her own pocket, risked her life and gotten battered and wounded - with no material benefits to show for it, nothing but the satisfaction of having done something good. This does not discourage her from later taking up another such case.

In most novels, Vic is drawn into murder cases connected to white-collar crime. She often ends up pursuing cases that affect her friends, estranged family, or those who she feels are being bullied by the wealthier and more powerful of Chicago. She repeatedly uncovers and confronts major combinations of crooked business people and corrupt politicians, much more powerful than she, and emerges with at least a partial victory. Often the identified murderer remains too powerful for the law to touch.

Vic is described as a lean, athletic brunette who runs to keep in shape and does not fear physical confrontations, relying on karate or her Smith & Wesson semi-automatic pistol with its nine-round magazine.

Hot-tempered, sarcastic, and fiercely self-reliant, Vic prefers T-shirts and jeans, and sleeps in the nude, but she can dress stylishly if necessary. She hates to admit being scared or vulnerable. Her capable and willful personality has led fans and literary critics to consider her one of the few feminist detectives. She loves opera and classical music, often singing arias and playing her piano in times of stress. She stays trim despite a ravenous appetite and favors multi-course ethnic meals with good wine. Throughout her adventures she recounts meals - what she had eaten, where, and whether or not it was tasty. She often indulges in big, greasy breakfasts and kielbasa sandwiches. She likes to soak for half an hour or more in her tub – a luxury that was not available in her childhood home.

She shares two golden retrievers, Peppy and Mitch, with her downstairs neighbor, Salvatore "Sal" Contreras - a WWII veteran who fought at Anzio, as well as being a retired trade unionist who took part in organizing militant strikes. She is an ardent fan of the Chicago Cubs in baseball and the Chicago Bears in football, closely following the ups and downs of their respective careers. Her favorite brand of whisky is the Johnnie Walker Black Label, though she takes care not to drink it on the job.

In addition to one failed marriage, Vic has had several lovers over the years, such as English insurance executive Roger Ferrant; Conrad Rawlings, a black Chicago police detective; war correspondent and human rights activist C.L. Morrell; and musician Jake Thibault. Some of these characters appear in more than one book, even after the formal relationship has ended. Warshawski can be a passionate and caring lover, and feels deeply hurt when a relationship is ended. She is fiercely independent even towards men she loves, would not consider living with one, and deeply resents their feeling protective towards her. Men who love her want to do so when she repeatedly risks her life in pursuing a hot case.

Her closest friend is Viennese physician Dr. Charlotte "Lotty" Herschel, who as a Jewish child escaped Nazi-Annexed Austria. Dr. Herschel treats Vic's various illnesses and combat-related injuries and is, in effect, her surrogate mother. With both actual mother and surrogate mother being refugees from the Nazis, Vic outspokenly identifies herself as being Jewish, though not religious and not member of any organized community. She has deep identification with Jewish history before and during the Holocaust. Having a typical Polish name and having grown up in a predominantly Polish American neighborhood, she is sometimes mistaken for a Catholic. In fact, her relations with the Catholic Church are complicated and ambiguous. Her childhood was overshadowed by a particularly tyrannical, bigoted, and racist Polish parish priest. In one book she gets into head-on confrontation with a manifestly criminal Cardinal with the Church hierarchy solidly behind him, and whom the Chicago Police - with a preponderance of Irish and Polish Catholics - dare not touch. On the other hand, Vic has a warm and affectionate contact with a Progressive Catholic priest working in a slum neighborhood who appears in several books and who can always be relied on to give discreet help and provide refuge to various fugitives and wayward youths which Vic encounters. The same distinction between "Progressives" and "Reactionaries" is also made in Vic's encounters with various Protestant clergy.

Vic's political stance is distinct: she opposes the Republican Party and maintains a critical view of the Democratic Party establishment, though she occasionally supports progressive Democrat candidates. The cases she works on frequently brings her in contact with various ethnic minorities, including Blacks, Hispanics, Muslims and others. She demonstrates support for illegal immigrants and occasionally gives them direct aid. While she opposes military intervention in the Middle East, she can be sympathetic to the soldiers deployed there and is ready to help soldiers who had been wronged.

== Recurring characters ==
- Carol Alvarado, a nurse at Dr. Herschel's clinic and good friend of Vic. She makes numerous appearances in the series, most notably in Bitter Medicine
- Paul Alvarado, Carol's brother and an architectural student. He thinks highly of Vic and considers her extended family
- Diego Alvarado, Paul and Carol's younger brother. Like Paul and Carol, he holds Vic in high esteem.
- Sal Barthele, statuesque owner of the Golden Glow bar and a good friend of Vic, who often refers to Sal as a "magnificent black woman"
- Freeman Carter, Vic's legal counsel on retainer
- Salvatore Contreras, Vic's downstairs widower neighbor and self-appointed father figure
- Roger Ferrant, a British businessman and one of Vic's earlier romantic interests
- Terry Finchley, a police detective whom Vic interacts with regularly; he became openly hostile to Vic while she was dating Conrad, but their relationship improved again after they broke up and Terry saw just how deeply she had cared for Conrad
- Darraugh Graham, an extremely important and long-standing client of Vic's
- Dr. Charlotte "Lotty" Herschel, close friend and perinatologist at Beth Israel Hospital; formerly had her own clinic as a general practitioner
- Max Loewenthal, Lotty’s significant other; executive director of Beth Israel Hospital and an art and music aficionado
- Bobby Mallory, a Lieutenant in the Chicago P.D. and friend of Vic's late father Tony
- John McGonnigal, police sergeant who regularly interacts with Vic
- Mary Louise Neely, an officer in the Chicago P.D. She was distant and indifferent to Vic when they first met, but in Tunnel Vision, she began to see Vic in a different light and by the end of the book, she has offered to become Vic's partner, which Vic accepted. She provides a significant amount of assistance to Vic over time and is also the legal guardian of Emily Messenger and her two brothers
- Conrad Rawlings, a detective in the Chicago P.D. Conrad and Vic were romantically involved for a while. He often calls her by the nickname "Ms. W"
- Tessa Reynolds, a popular local sculptor and good friend of Vic. She and Vic share a large working space together after the building where her original office was located was demolished
- Murray Ryerson, reporter at the Herald-Star newspaper; Vic's longtime friend and sometime rival; he usually refers to Vic as "O-She-who-must-be-obeyed" whenever she asks him for a favor

== Bibliography ==
=== Novels ===
With year of first publication:

- Indemnity Only (1982)
- Deadlock (1984)
- Killing Orders (1985)
- Bitter Medicine (1987)
- Blood Shot (1988) – published as Toxic Shock in the UK
- Burn Marks (1990)
- Guardian Angel (1992)
- Tunnel Vision (1994)
- Hard Time (1999)
- Total Recall (2001)
- Blacklist (2003)
- Fire Sale (2005)
- Hardball (2009)
- Body Work (2010)
- Breakdown (2012)
- Critical Mass (2013)
- Brush Back (2015)
- Fallout (2017)
- Shell Game (2018)
- Dead Land (2020)
- Overboard (2022)
- Pay Dirt (2024)

=== Short story collections ===
- Windy City Blues (1995) – published as V.I. for Short in the UK
- V.I. × 2 (2002)
- V.I. × 3 (2011) (supersedes V.I. × 2)
- Love & Other Crimes (2020) (fourteen stories, eight of which feature V.I. Warshawski)

=== Adaptations ===
Deadlock was adapted as a 1991 film, V. I. Warshawski, with Kathleen Turner in the title role. The film, which took many creative liberties with Paretsky's character, was intended as a franchise for Turner but was not a commercial success, grossing $11.1 million domestically.

BBC Radio 4 has produced four radio dramas based on novels in the series, starting in 1991. The first two, Killing Orders and Deadlock, feature Kathleen Turner reprising her movie role, with Eleanor Bron as Dr. Charlotte “Lotty” Herschel. The third, Bitter Medicine, stars Sharon Gless as Warshawski. A fourth production, Publicity Stunts, is a dramatic reading performed by Buffy Davis.
