= Blacklist (novel) =

2003 novel by Sara Paretsky

- Cover of the first edition
- Author: Sara Paretsky
- Language: English
- Series: V. I. Warshawski #11
- Genre: Crime novel
- Publisher: Putnam
- Publication date: September 29, 2003
- Publication place: United States
- Media type: Print (Hardback)
- Pages: 448 pp.
- ISBN: 0-399-15085-4
- OCLC: 51726908
- Dewey Decimal: 813/.54 21
- LC Class: PS3566.A647 B55 2003

Blacklist is a 2003 novel by crime writer Sara Paretsky. It features Private Investigator V. I. Warshawski, and was awarded the 2004 Crime Writers' Association Gold Dagger.

== Plot ==
Chicago private detective V.I. Warshawski is asked by a longtime client to look into his mother's suspicion that trespassers are living in the empty mansion her father built. V.I. discovers a corpse on the property that is found to be a young black journalist who was writing about members of a 1930s federal theater project and one member in particular who was blacklisted during the Communist witch hunt. V.I. is hired by the journalist's sister to investigate his death.
