= Sara Paretsky =

American author of detective fiction

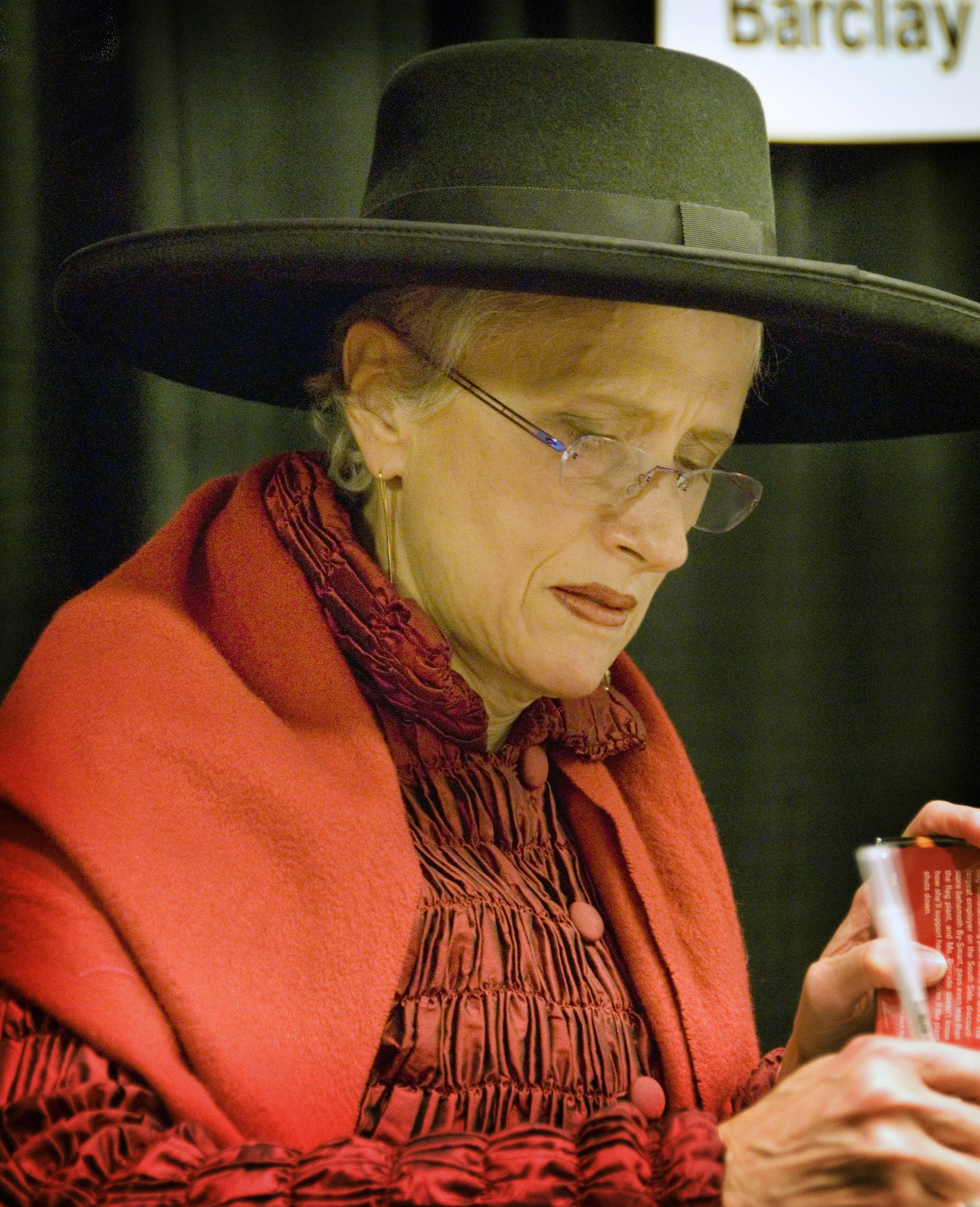
- Born: June 8, 1947 (age 79); Ames, Iowa, U.S.
- Education: University of Kansas (BA); University of Chicago (MBA, PhD)
- Occupation: Novelist
- Spouse: S. Courtenay Wright (m. 1976; died 2018)
- Children: 3
- Writing career
- Genre: Crime fiction
- Website: saraparetsky.com

Sara Paretsky (born June 8, 1947) is an American author of detective fiction, most notable for her novels focused on the protagonist V. I. Warshawski.

== Life and career ==
Paretsky was born in Ames, Iowa. Her father, David, was a microbiologist and moved the family to Kansas in 1951 after taking a job at the University of Kansas, where Paretsky eventually graduated. The family rented an old farmhouse. Her relationship with her parents was strained; her mother, Mary, was an alcoholic and her father was a harsh disciplinarian.

After obtaining a bachelor's degree in political science from the University of Kansas, she did community service work on the south side of Chicago in 1966 and returned in 1968 to work there. She completed her AM (masters) degree at the University of Chicago in 1969 and completed a Ph.D. in history there in 1977; her dissertation was titled "The Breakdown of Moral Philosophy in New England Before the Civil War". She also earned an MBA in 1977 from the University of Chicago Booth School of Business.

Her husband, Courtenay Wright, was a professor of physics at the University of Chicago; the two were together from 1970 until his death in 2018.

Paretsky is an alumna of the Ragdale Foundation. She was to appear in an amateur light opera production in 2011.

The protagonist of all but three of Paretsky's novels is the female private investigator V.I. Warshawski, and the author is credited with transforming the role and image of women in the crime novel. The Winter 2007 issue of Clues: A Journal of Detection is devoted to her work. She is also considered the founding mother of Sisters in Crime, an organization that supports and promotes women in the mystery field.

== Published works ==
=== Novels ===
- Indemnity Only (1982) ISBN 0385272138
- Deadlock (1984) ISBN 0385279337
- Killing Orders (1985) ISBN 068804820X
- Bitter Medicine (1987) ISBN 0688064485
- Blood Shot (1988) ISBN 0440500354 (Published in the UK as Toxic Shock)
- Burn Marks (1990) ISBN 0385298927
- Guardian Angel (1992) ISBN 0385299311
- Tunnel Vision (1994) ISBN 038529932X
- Ghost Country (1998) ISBN 9780385333368 (non-Warshawski novel)
- Hard Time (1999) ISBN 0385313632
- Total Recall (2001) ISBN 0385313667
- Blacklist (2003) ISBN 0399150854
- Fire Sale (2005) ISBN 9780739455944
- Bleeding Kansas (2008) ISBN 9780399154058 (non-Warshawski novel)
- Hardball (2009) ISBN 9781101133828
- Body Work (2010) ISBN 9780399156748
- Breakdown (2012) ISBN 9781101554074
- Critical Mass (2013) ISBN 9781101636503
- Brush Back (2015) ISBN 9780399160578
- Fallout (2017) ISBN 9781473624337
- Shell Game (2018) ISBN 9780062435866
- Dead Land (2020) ISBN 9780062435927
- Overboard (2022) ISBN 9780063010888
- Pay Dirt (2024) ISBN 9780063010932
- Bad Company (2026) ISBN 9781250412195 (non-Warshawski novel)

=== Short story collections ===
- Windy City Blues, Delacorte (1995). ISBN 0385315023.
  - (Published in the UK as V.I. for Short)
- A Taste of Life and Other Stories (1995), London: Penguin. ISBN 0146000404
- Love & Other Crimes (2020). ISBN 9780062915542

=== eBooks ===
- Photo Finish (2000). ISBN 9781101537510
- V.I. x 2 (2002) includes short stories "Photo Finish" & "Publicity Stunts".
- V.I. x 3 (2011) includes both stories from V.I. x 2 and "A Family Sunday in the Park". ISBN 9781257416448

=== Non-fiction ===
- Case Studies in Alternative Education (1975). Chicago Center for New Schools.
- Writing in an Age of Silence (2007). ISBN 9781844671229
- Words, Works, and Ways of Knowing: The Breakdown of Moral Philosophy in New England Before the Civil War. Chicago: University of Chicago Press, 2016.

=== As editor ===
- Eye of a Woman (1990). New York: Delacorte Press;
  - as A Woman's Eye: New Stories by the Best Women Crime Writers (1991). London: Virago.
- Women on the Case (1997). ISBN 9780440223252;
  - as Woman's Other Eye (1996). London: Virago.
- Sisters on the Case (2007). ISBN 9780451222398

== Awards and recognition ==
- 1986 Anthony Award nomination for best novel, Killing Orders
- 1989 Anthony Award nomination for best novel, Blood Shot
- 1992 Anthony Award winner of best short story collection, A Woman's Eye
- 2002 Cartier Diamond Dagger Award for lifetime achievement by the Crime Writers' Association.
- 2004 Gold Dagger Award for Blacklist by the Crime Writers' Association.
- 2011 Anthony Award Lifetime Achievement Award winner
- 2011 Grand Master by the Mystery Writers of America
- 2019 Mystery Writers of America Winner of Sue Grafton Memoriam, Shell Game
- 2021 Mystery Writers of America Nomination for Sue Grafton Memoriam, Dead Land
