= Dearborn Street =

Street in Chicago, Illinois

- Lafayette Avenue; 36 West
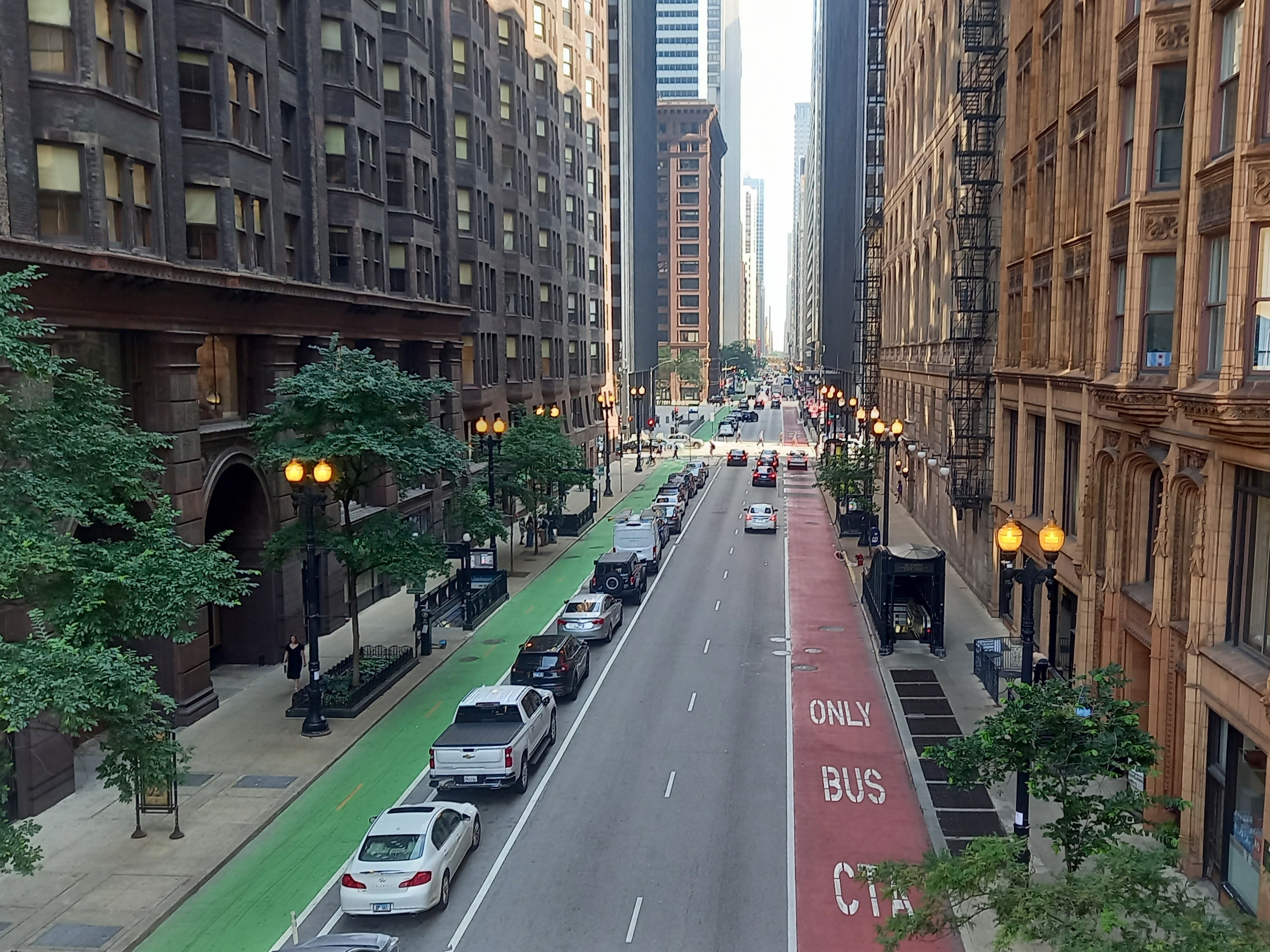
- Dearborn Street at Library–State/Van Buren station in the Chicago Loop
- Interactive map of Dearborn Street
- Location: South Holland, Dolton, Riverdale, Chicago
- South end: Cul-de-sac south of 155th Place
- North end: North Boulevard at the Near North Side–Lincoln Park line

Dearborn Street is a street in Chicago, where it is 36 W in its grid system. It is the street immediately to the west of State Street, the city's north–south baseline.

Dearborn Street appears on James Thompson's 1830 plat of Chicago, and was named for being the closest named north–south street to Fort Dearborn. (Note: State Street, the street immediately abutting the fort, was the unnamed boundary of the plat.)

== Route description ==
=== South suburbs and the South Side ===
Dearborn Street begins as a residential street at 155th Place in South Holland near South Suburban College. Segments of Dearborn Street throughout the south suburbs and South Side neighborhoods are disjointed residential streets. Dearborn Street noticeably shifts westward by a few blocks north of Sibley Boulevard.

Dearborn Street returns in the West Pullman neighborhood in Chicago; however, it goes by the name "Lafayette Avenue" throughout most of the South Side. Lafayette Avenue serves as a southbound frontage road for I-94 (Dan Ryan Expressway) between 98th Place and 66th Street. Lafayette Avenue becomes Dearborn Street again north of Garfield Boulevard. Dearborn Street gets interrupted due to areas occupied or once occupied by public housing projects (Robert Taylor Homes, Stateway Gardens, Dearborn Homes, Harold L. Ickes Homes, and Hilliard Towers Apartments) as well as the Illinois Institute of Technology campus.

=== Downtown area ===
Dearborn Street also gets interrupted by Dearborn Park, a residential area that occupies the now-demolished railyard for Dearborn Station. Dearborn Street resumes at Polk Street directly north of the preserved station building. Although Dearborn Street is a one-way road serving northbound vehicular traffic, it hosts a two-way north–south bikeway through downtown from Polk Street to Kinzie Street. The Dearborn Street Bridge carries the street across the Chicago River. Dearborn Street becomes a two-way road after passing Washington Square Park before ending at North Boulevard south of Lincoln Park.

== Transportation ==
Although there is not a bus route dedicated to Dearborn Street, plenty of bus routes run along Dearborn Street, particularly in downtown and the Near North Side neighborhood. CTA bus routes 22, 24, 36, 62, 70, and 151, as well as Pace bus routes 850, 851, and 855 all run along Dearborn Street at some point. In the South Side, CTA bus route 75 runs south along Lafayette Avenue to serve 79th station on the Red Line. Because State Street is a frontage road serving northbound traffic, southbound bus route 29 runs along Lafayette Avenue.

The Milwaukee-Dearborn subway underlies the street downtown.
