= First Aid Care Team =

The First Aid Care Team (FACT) was a rapid-response emergency medical program unit serving areas of Chicago in conjunction with standard Emergency Medical Services units. The unit existed from 1984 to 2005.

== Overview ==
Created in 1984, the First Aid Care Team Program was a cooperative public and private effort bringing together the Chicago Fire Department, Hull House Association, Chicago Housing Authority, University of Chicago Emergency Medical Services and Malcolm X College. It operated as an extension of the City of Chicago's Emergency Medical Services Community, aiding in distinguishing life-threatening medical emergencies and potentially disabling injuries from non-emergency incidents in order to streamline further emergency response.

The FACT Program was designed to supplement the Chicago Fire Department's Emergency Medical Services. It had a twofold purpose in providing emergency care, health awareness, and education to the community while also offering educational and employment opportunities to the community's residents.

== Organization ==
Jane Addams Hull House Association was the first to provide an on-site Medical care team in a Chicago Housing Authority public housing development. There were four stations: Fact Team I was in the Robert Taylor Homes, Fact team II was in Stateway Gardens, Fact Team III was in Harold Ickes Homes and Fact Team IV was in the Abla Community.

FACT offices were located on the first floors of the high rise buildings. The FACT program was sponsored by the Chicago Fire Department and the Jane Addams Hull House Association and medically supervised by the University of Chicago Hospitals' Department of Emergency Medicine.

== Emergency response ==
The only program of its kind in the United States, the FACT Program provided pre-hospital Basic Life Support (BLS) and Emergency Medical care 24 hours a day to residents of Chicago's public housing developments. FACT responded to both 9-1-1 emergency calls and to residents who walked into FACT premises for service.

Once a resident called 9-1-1 for emergency service, the Office of Emergency Management & Communication (OEMC) simultaneously dispatched an ambulance company and notified personnel at one of the FACT stations via portable radio or dedicated land line (telephone). FACT technicians were generally the first on the scene, arriving within minutes due to their onsite location. Once on the scene, FACT technicians could provide Basic Life Support and attend to everything from trauma to medical emergencies.

== Program impact ==
In its time running, the First Aid Care Team responded to over 36,333 requests for emergency assistance, of which 9,914 were classified as "non-transports", cases where FACT technicians provided medical services on-site and no ambulance was dispatched based on the technicians evaluation, thereby reducing the number of "no service" calls experienced by Chicago Fire Department ambulances.

Among residents who served as FACT technicians, 46 are now paramedics with the Chicago Fire Department, 3 are 911 dispatchers with the Office of Emergency Management & Communications, and one person is a Chicago Police Officer.

== See also ==
- Stateway Gardens
- Robert Taylor Homes
- ABLA
