= Aono =

Aono (written: 青野) is a Japanese surname. Notable people with the surname include:

- Daisuke Aono (青野 大介; born 1979), Japanese football player
- Joanne Aono, Japanese American artist
- Ryō Aono (青野 令; born 1990), Japanese snowboarder
- So Aono (青野 聰; born 1943), Japanese novelist
- Taka Aono, Japanese drift driver
- Takeshi Aono (青野 武; 1936–2012), Japanese voice actor and actor
- Takeshi Aono (baseball) (青野 毅; born 1983), Japanese professional baseball infielder
- Teruichi Aono (青野 照市; born 1953), Japanese professional 9-dan shogi professional who has written a number of shogi learning materials that were translated in English

== Fictional characters ==
- Gintaro Aono, a character in Murder on the Leviathan
- Miki Aono, a character in Fresh Pretty Cure!
- Tsukune Ano, a character in Rosario + Vampire
