= Temple Sholom =

Reform synagogue in Illinois, United States

Temple Sholom of Chicago
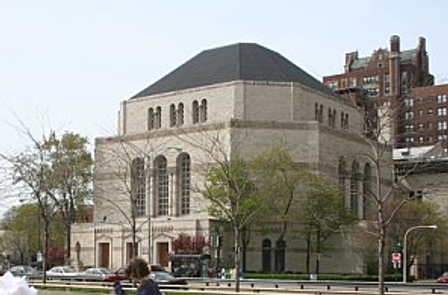
- Temple Sholom on Chicago's Lake Shore Drive

- Location in Chicago, Illinois

Religion
- Affiliation: Reform Judaism
- Ecclesiastical or organizational status: Synagogue
- Leadership: Rabbi Shoshanah Conover; Rabbi Scott Gellman (Associate); Rabbi Rena Singer (Assistant)
- Status: Active
- Notable artwork: Stained-glass windows by both Nehemia Azaz and Leon Golub

Location
- Location: 3480 North Lake Shore Drive, Chicago, Illinois 60657
- Country: United States
- Interactive map of Temple Sholom of Chicago
- Coordinates: 41°56′45″N 87°38′30″W

Architecture
- Architects: Loebl, Schlossman & Demuth; Charles Hodgson; Charles Allerton Coolidge
- Type: Synagogue
- Style: Byzantine Revival; Moorish Revival
- Established: 1867 (as a congregation)
- Completed: 1928
- Capacity: 1,350 worshipers

Website
- sholomchicago.org

Temple Sholom (formally Temple Sholom of Chicago) is a Reform Jewish congregation and synagogue located at 3480 North Lake Shore Drive in Chicago, Illinois, in the United States. Founded in 1867, as of 2010 it was one of the oldest and largest congregations in Chicago with over 1,100 member families.

== Architecture ==
The current building's design began as a 1921 assignment given to three students at the School of Architecture at the Armour Institute, with the assistance of professional architects Charles Hodgson and Charles Allerton Coolidge. The official architects for the Byzantine Revival and Moorish Revival synagogue were Loebl, Schlossman and DeMuth. The western wall of the 1,350-seat sanctuary was mounted on wheels so that it could be moved, opening the room into the adjoining social hall almost doubling the capacity.

In 1972, Israeli artist Nehemia Azaz was commissioned to create a set of five stained glass windows representing selections from Job, Proverbs, Psalms, Ezra and Nehemiah.

In 1996 Leon Golub was given a commission to design a set of stained glass windows for Temple Sholom in Chicago, the four windows depict the life of Joseph. These would be the only stained glass windows Leon Golub ever did. They were fabricated in New York by Victor Rothman and Gene Mallard.

== Rabbi Frederick C. Schwartz Library and Mendelson Gallery ==
The Rabbi Frederick C. Schwartz Library holds 6,000 adult books, 2,000 children's books, 300 videos and 30 journals. The Mendelson Gallery exhibits Jewish art.

== See also ==
- Architecture of Chicago
- History of the Jews in Chicago
- Landmarks of Chicago
