= Loop Synagogue =

Synagoge in Chicago, Illinois, United States

Chicago Loop Synagogue
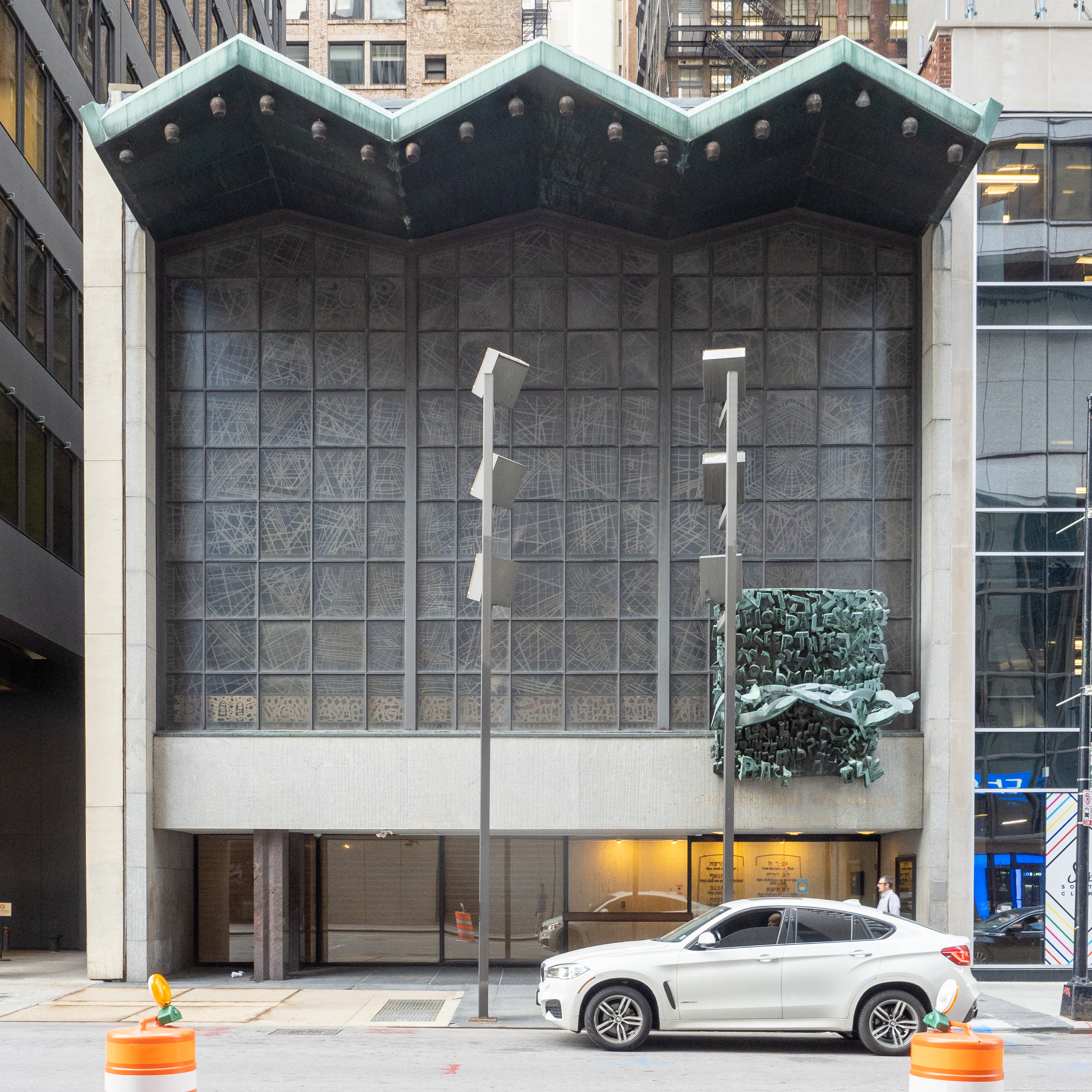

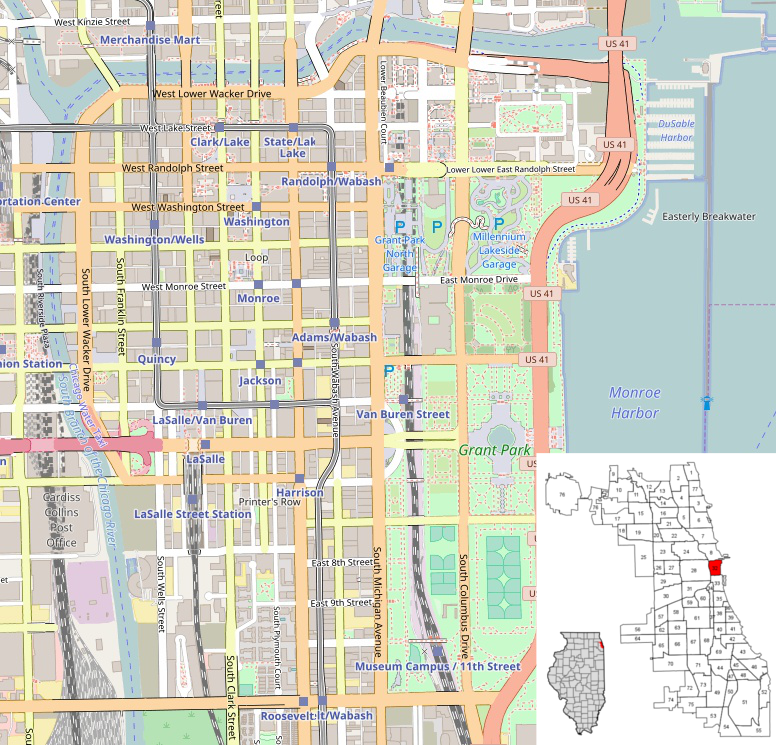
- Location in the Chicago Loop, Illinois

Religion
- Affiliation: Orthodox Judaism
- Ecclesiastical or organizational status: Synagogue
- Status: Active
- Notable artworks: Abraham Rattner stained-glass windows; Nehemia Azaz sculpture

Location
- Location: 16 South Clark Street, Loop, Chicago, Illinois 60603
- Country: United States
- Interactive map of Chicago Loop Synagogue
- Coordinates: 41°52′54″N 87°37′53″W

Architecture
- Architect: Loebl, Schlossman & Bennett
- Type: Synagogue
- Style: Modernist
- Established: 1929 (as a congregation)
- Completed: 1958

Specifications
- Site area: 5,000 square feet (460 m^{2})
- Materials: Glass, metal (brass and bronze) and concrete

Website
- chiloopsyn.org

The Chicago Loop Synagogue is an Orthodox Jewish synagogue, located at 16 South Clark Street, in the Loop precinct of Chicago, Illinois, in the United States. Completed in 1958, the synagogue is renowned for a stained glass artwork by Abraham Rattner.

The synagogue was founded in 1929 by the United Synagogue of America to serve the needs of Jewish professionals working in Chicago’s downtown business district, providing kosher food and a place to pray during the workday. Following the COVID-19 global pandemic, there were concerns that, due to the exodus of workers from the city center, the synagogue would be unable to sustain its future operating costs.

== Architecture and design ==
The building was designed by architects Loebl, Schlossman & Bennett, who also designed the Richard J. Daley Center. Completed in 1958, the synagogue building replaced a synagogue on the same block that had been lost to fire.

A sculpture Hands of Peace by Nehemia Azaz is situated over the entrance doors. The work depicts "priestly hands raised in benediction" (the Priestly Blessing).

=== Let There Be Light ===
Abraham Rattner's 30 ft × 40 ft (9.1 m × 12.2 m) Let There Be Light (Note: Also listed as And God Said, Let There Be Light and The Journey of a Mystic) occupies the entire eastern wall of the second-floor sanctuary. It stands in juxtaposition to the "reserved minimalism" of the rest of the interior. The art depicts images from Genesis 1:3 and Jewish religious symbols including a menorah, a shofar and an etrog. Additional influences include kabbalistic symbolism of "the force and the spirit of the ineffable and unknowable power".

It was described as "[p]erhaps the most beautiful synagogue interior in the United States". Another critic said the glass "bathes the sanctuary in a shower of color, artistically consecrating the space as a place apart from the grey concrete scene on the other side of the glass".

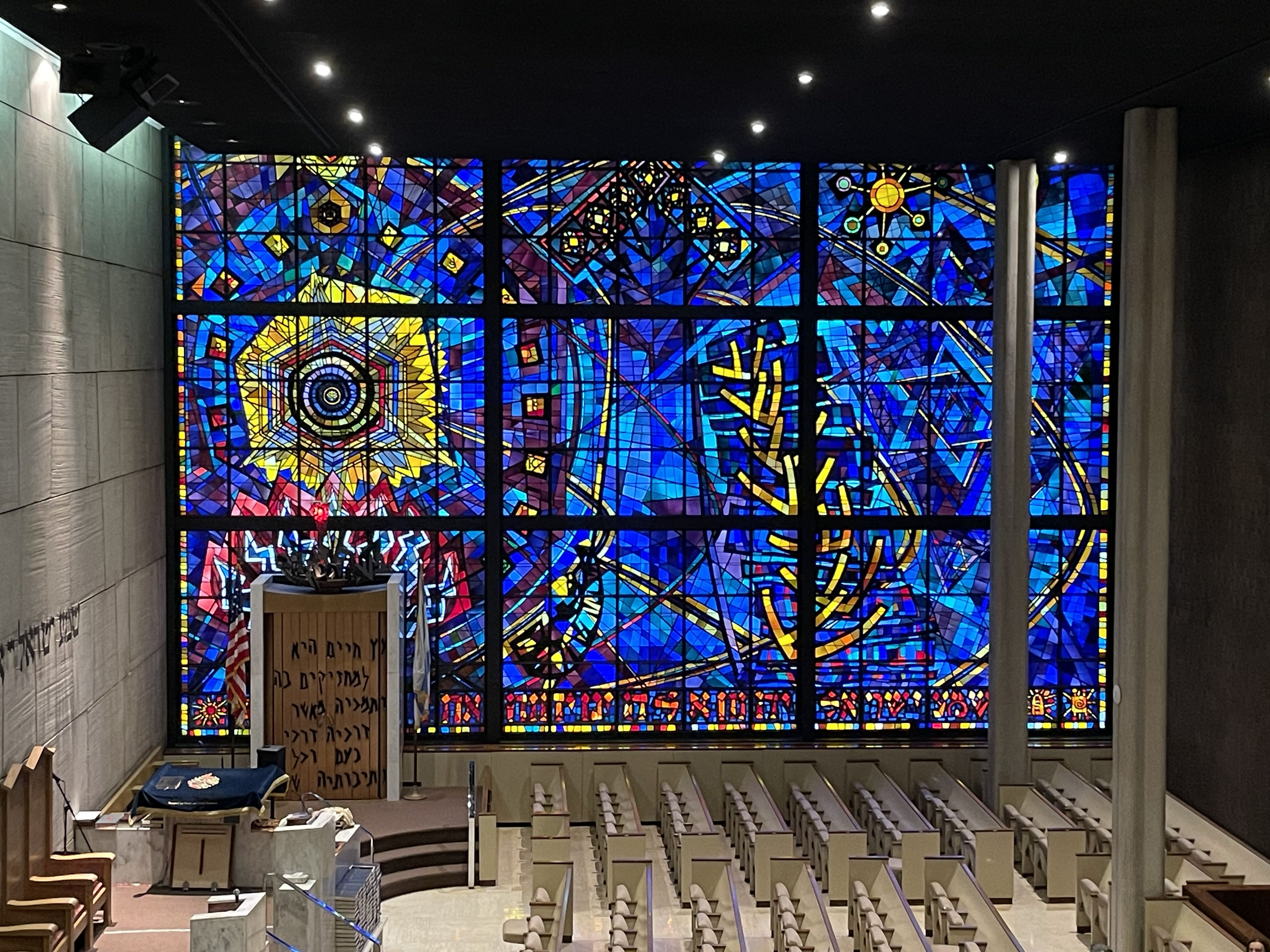
A view of Let There Be Light from the interior of the synagogue.

== See also ==
- Chicago Loop
- History of the Jews in Chicago
- Landmarks of Chicago
- Visual arts of Chicago
