= Loebl Schlossman & Hackl =

American architecture firm based in Chicago, Illinois

Practice information
- Partners: Donald Hackl; Edward D. Dart (former)
- Founders: Jerrold Loebl; Norman Schlossman
- Founded: 1925
- Location: Chicago, Illinois

Significant works and honors
- Buildings: Water Tower Place; Two Prudential Plaza; Loop Synagogue; Richard J. Daley Center
- Projects: Park Forest, Illinois

Loebl Schlossman & Hackl is an American architecture, interior design, and planning firm based in Chicago, Illinois. Founded in 1925 and known by various names through the years, the firm is responsible for the design of several major Chicago landmarks including Water Tower Place in 1975 and Two Prudential Plaza in 1990.

== History ==
=== Early years ===
The firm was founded by Armour Institute of Technology students Jerrold Loebl (1899-1978) and Norman J. Schlossman (1901-1990) in 1925, initially focusing on housing design. Schlossman and Loebl's first commission as partners was a French Revival design for the home of Harry Misch, located in Glencoe, Illinois. The house was completed in 1926 and is designated as 'Historically Significant' by the Historic Glencoe Architectural Survey. The firm also designed the Mediterranean Revival Gustave Rosenau home in 1926, considered an 'Honorary Landmark' by Glencoe Village. The firm designed the Stein residence and the Frederick Penfield house in 1926 and 1927 respectively, both in the French Revival style and considered 'Historically Significant' by Glencoe Village.

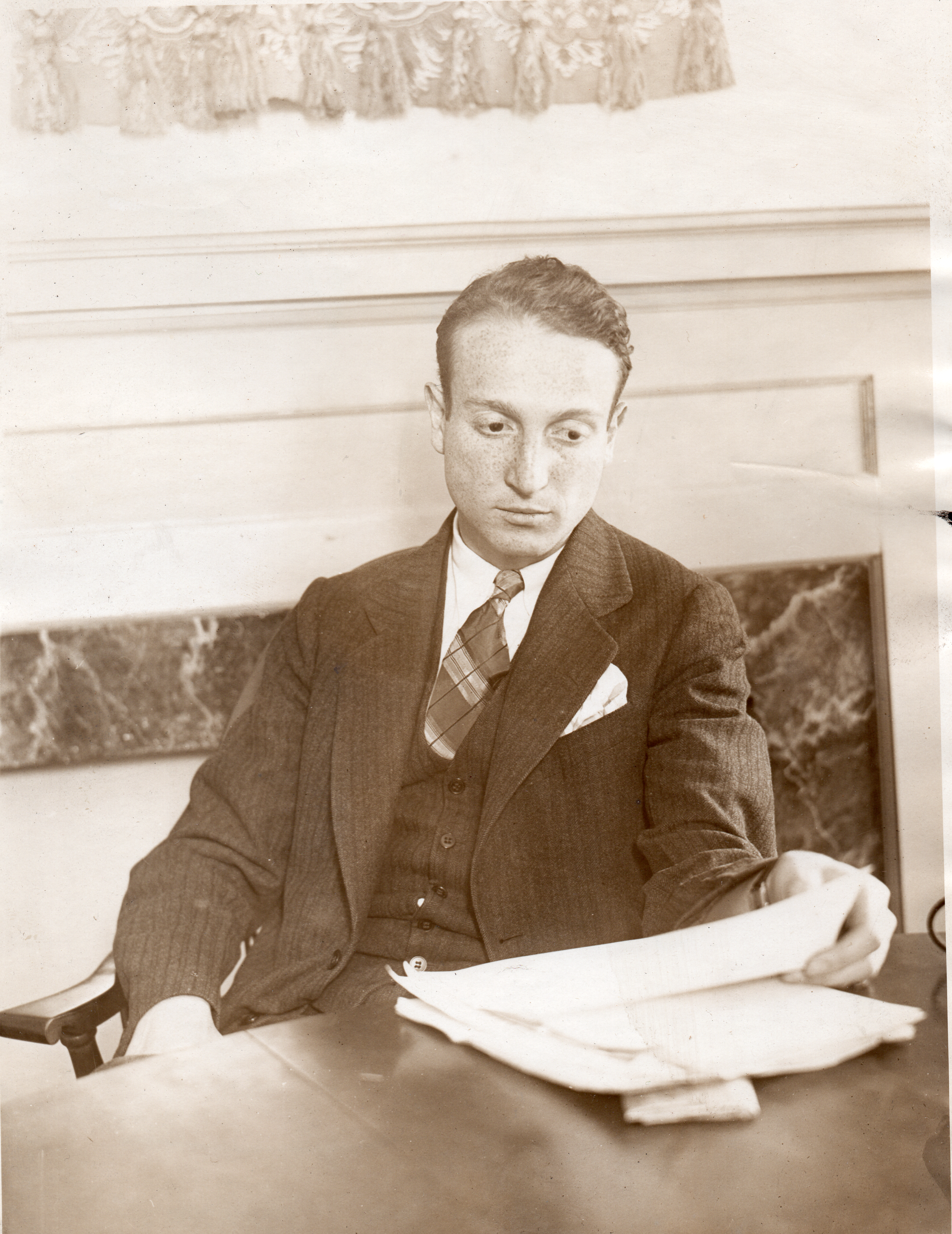
Norman Schlossman in 1926.

The firm's first major project was the Temple Sholom on Lake Shore Drive, dedicated in 1930. Loebl and Schlossman largely developed the design as part of their theses in 1921 at the Armour Institute of Technology. With a third architect John DeMuth producing full-size technical drawings, the young team was named as associate architects for the project with professional assistance from Coolidge and Hodgdon.

In the war years Loebl and Schlossman concentrated on war-related public housing projects on government contracts. This included some 500 units in Seymour, Indiana and Rosiclaire, Illinois. Further projects for the Chicago Housing Authority included the West Chesterfield Homes in 1944, Wentworth Gardens in 1946, and the 800 units in mid-rise, six-story, and nine-story residential towers on the 16 acres of the south-side Dearborn Homes in 1950.

The firm expanded with the addition of Richard M. Bennett (1907-1996), who had been chairman of the Yale Architecture Department, in 1947. Bennett took the lead in the site plan and the architectural components of the suburban planned community of Park Forest, Illinois, which occupied the firm for years. The town's innovative 1949 Park Forest Plaza shopping center developed into another sideline for the firm: a genre of rambling, cleverly landscaped, village-like outdoor malls. These include Old Orchard Shopping Center in Skokie, Illinois in 1956, and the 1962 Oakbrook Center in Oak Brook.

Designer Edward D. Dart joined in 1965 and triggered another wave of ambitious projects. The firm were associate architects for the Richard J. Daley Center, completed in 1965. Bennett left in 1974 to teach at the Harvard Graduate School of Design; Dart's career hadn't peaked when he died of an aneurysm in July 1975.

The firm continues in business as of 2017. It has operated as:

- Loebl and Schlossman (1925)
- Loebl, Schlossman and DeMuth (1926-c.1933)
- Loebl and Schlossman (c.1933-1946)
- Loebl, Schlossman and Bennett (1947-1965)
- Loebl, Schlossman, Bennett and Dart (1965-1975)
- Loebl Schlossman & Hackl (1976- )

== Major Projects ==
All structures are in Chicago unless otherwise noted:

- Temple Sholom at 3480 N. Lake Shore Drive, 1928
- Complete design for the planned community of Park Forest, Illinois, 1947
- Dearborn Homes, 1949-50
- Park Forest Plaza, Park Forest, Illinois, 1949
- Temple Beth-El, with architectural sculpture by Mitzi Cunliffe, South Bend, Indiana, 1950
- West Suburban Temple Har Zion, with architectural sculpture by Milton Horn, River Forest, Illinois, 1950
- Twin residential towers at 1350 Lake Shore Drive, the former location of the Palmer Mansion, 1951
- Old Orchard Shopping Center, with landscape architect Lawrence Halprin, Skokie, Illinois, 1956
- Woodlands Academy of the Sacred Heart, Lake Forest, Illinois, 1961
- Oakbrook Center, also with Halprin, Oak Brook, Illinois, 1962
- Winton Place residential high-rise, Lakewood, Ohio, 1963
- Associate architects for the Richard J. Daley Center, 1965
- River Oaks Center, Calumet City, Illinois, 1966
- Norris University Center, Northwestern University, Evanston, Illinois, 1971
- Water Tower Place, the tallest reinforced concrete building in the world until 1990, 1975
- Pick-Staiger Concert Hall, Evanston, 1975
- Mary and Leigh Block Museum of Art, Evanston, 1980
- Two Prudential Plaza, 1990
- Emil and Patricia Jones Convocation Center, 2007
- Renovation of The Palmer House Hilton, 2007-2009
- Wentz Concert Hall and Fine Arts Center, North Central College, Naperville, 2008

=== Selected works ===
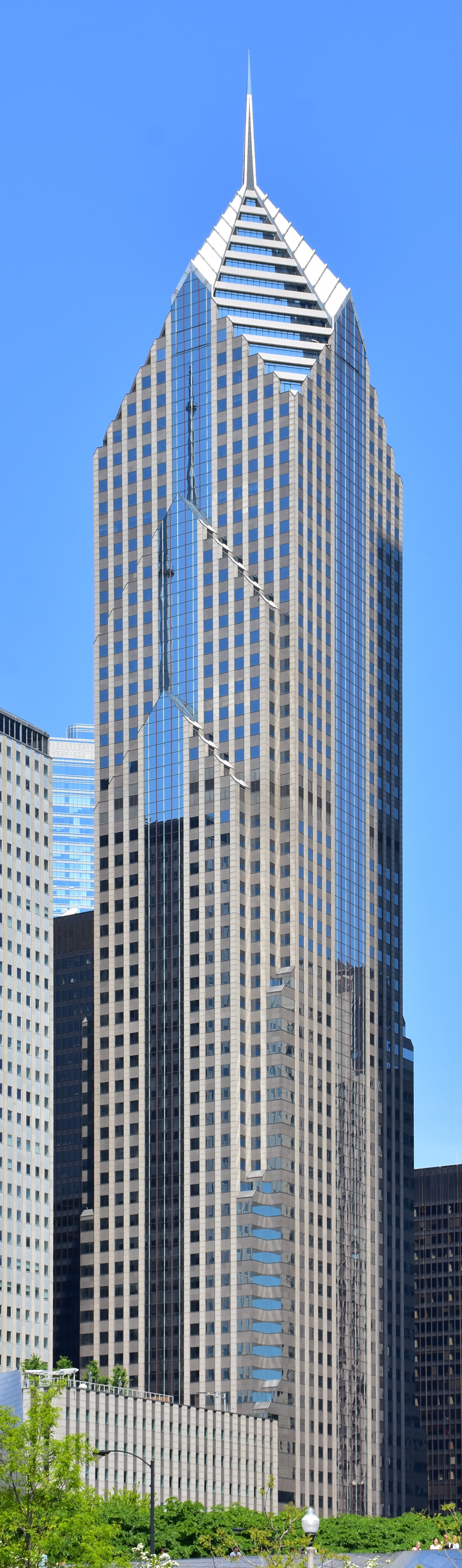
Two Prudential Plaza

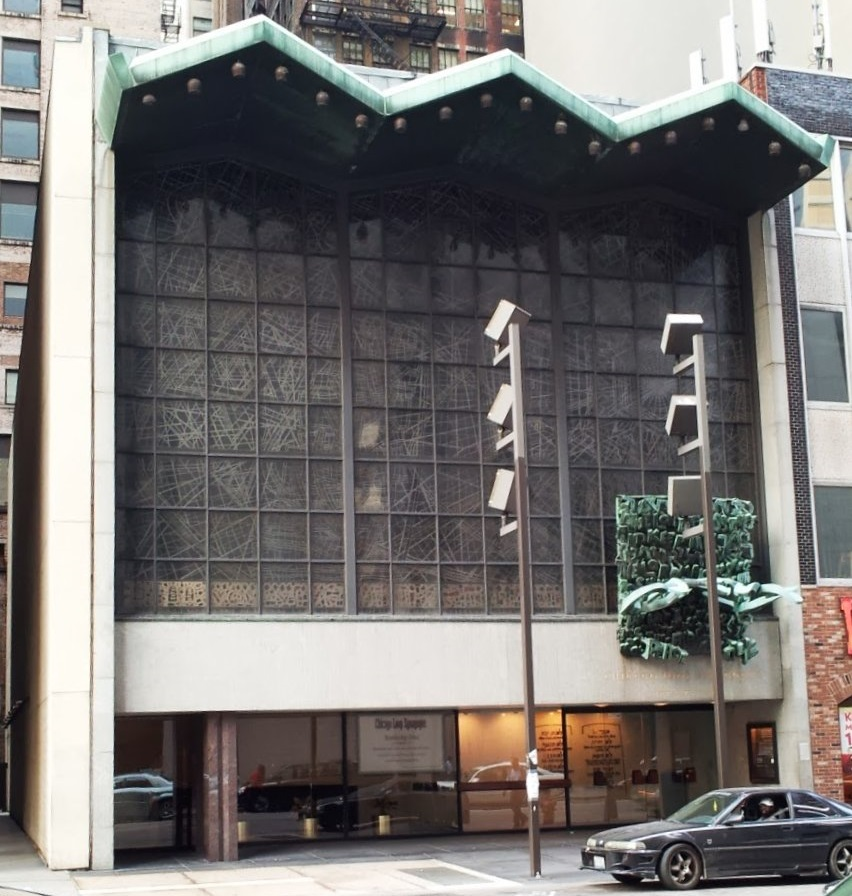
Loop Synagogue

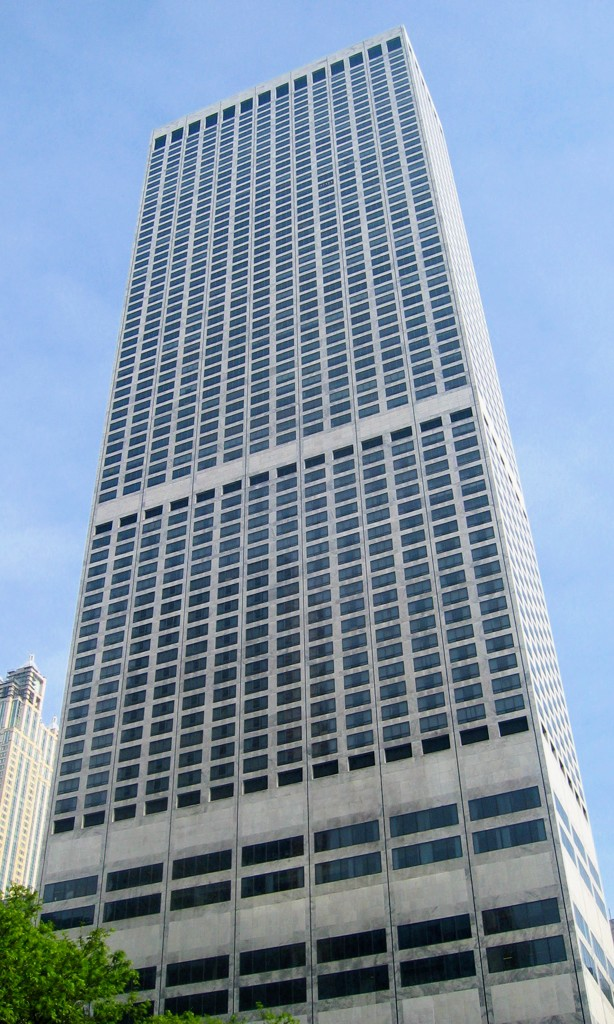
Water Tower Place

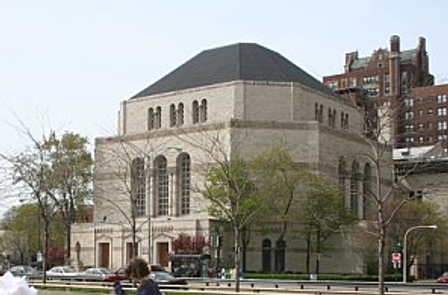
Temple Sholom

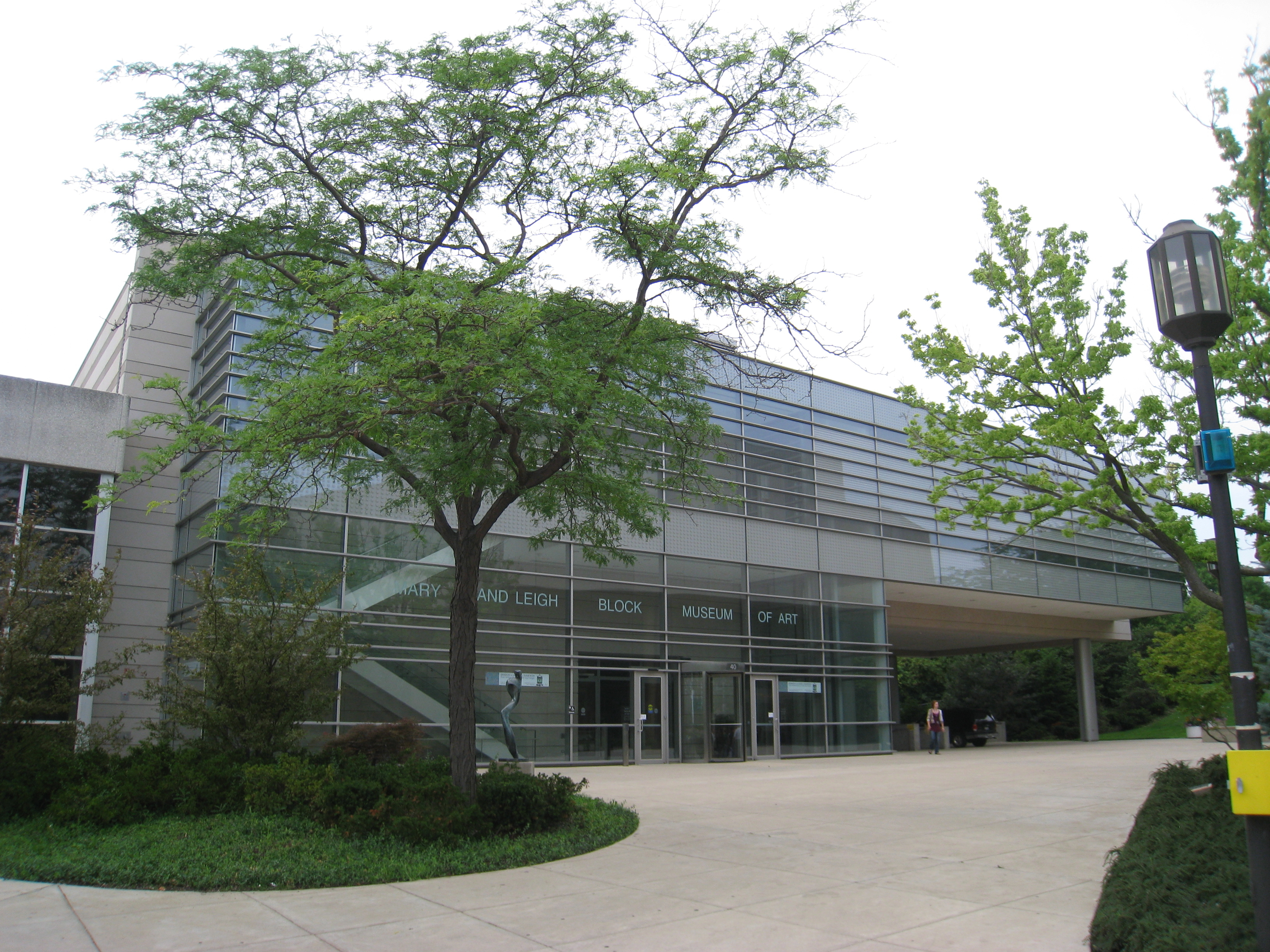
Mary and Leigh Block Museum of Art
