= Dearborn Homes =

Public housing development located on the Southside of Chicago, Illinois, US

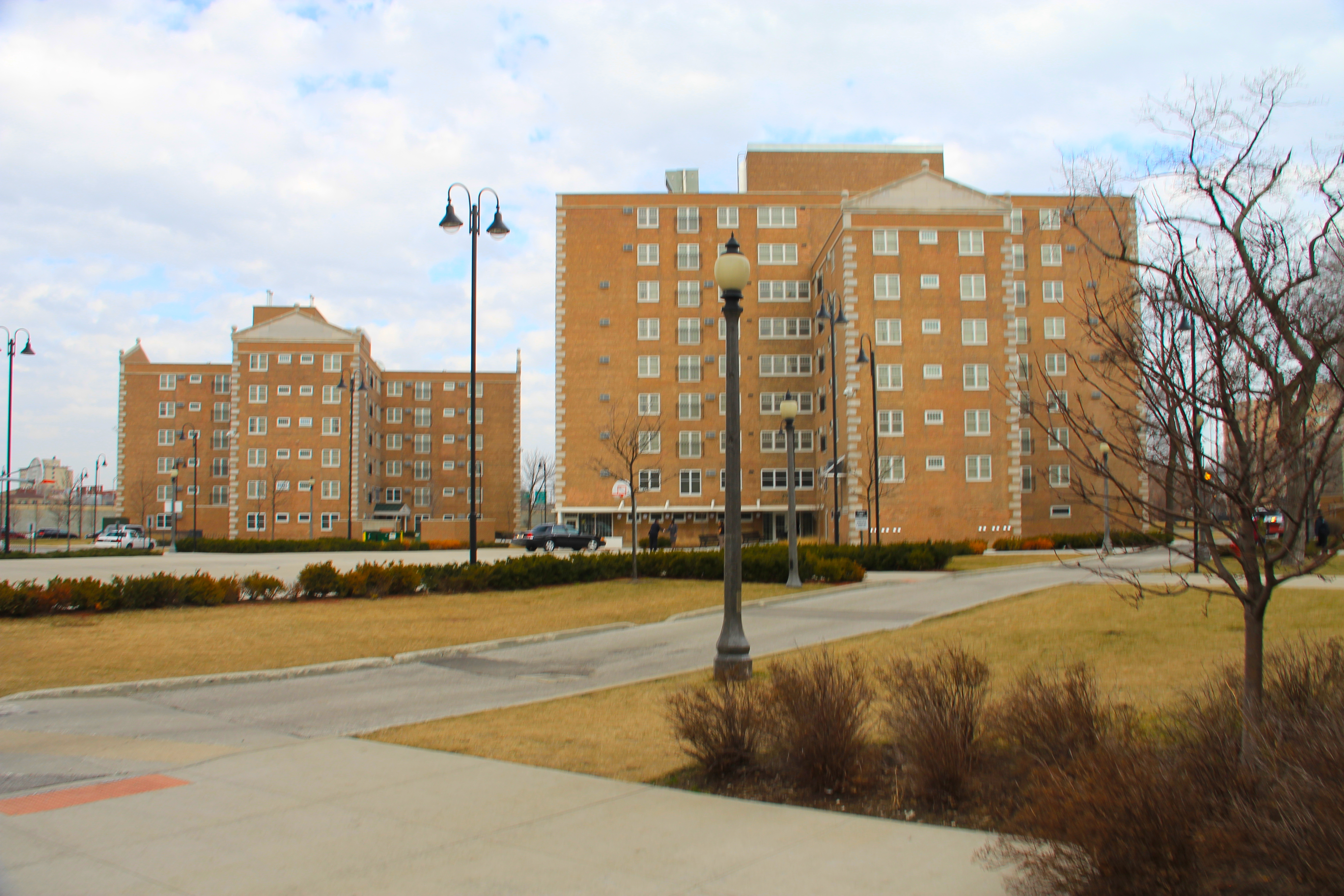
- 2009 photograph of two Dearborn Homes buildings shortly after renovation.
- Interactive map of Dearborn Homes

General information
- Location: Bordered by 27th Street, 30th Street, State Street, and Federal Street; Chicago, Illinois, United States
- Coordinates: 41.8431°N 87.6278°W
- Status: 660 units; Renovated

Construction
- Constructed: 1949–50

Other information
- Governing body: Chicago Housing Authority

Dearborn Homes is a Chicago Housing Authority (CHA) public housing project located in the Bronzeville neighborhood on the South Side of Chicago, Illinois. It is located along State Street between 27th and 30th Streets, and bounded by the Metra rail line to the west. It is one of only two housing projects that still exist from the State Street Corridor which included other CHA developments: Robert Taylor Homes, Stateway Gardens, Harold Ickes Homes and Hillard Homes.

The project occupies 16 acres (6.5 ha) and consists of mid-rise, six-story, and nine-story buildings. They were designed in modernist style by Loebl, Schlossman & Bennett, with cruciform towers to allow for ventilation and light, placed in a parklike setting. There were 800 units.

== History ==
Dearborn was the first Chicago housing project built after World War II, as housing for blacks on part of the Federal Street slum within the "black belt". It was the start of the Chicago Housing Authority's post-war use of high-rise buildings to accommodate more units at a lower overall cost, and when it opened in 1950, the first to have elevators.

While still unfinished, it was used to receive lower-income residents displaced by redevelopment; half the buildings were also increased in height by three floors when more money became available during construction. The buildings soon fell victim to vandalism; in 1958 a Chicago American reporter visited Dearborn and wrote of "torn window screens, mutilated storm doors, yards littered with garbage, . . . walls, doors, and casings marked by knife slashes and crayon marks; holes gouged in plaster; [and] obscenities scrawled on the stairway walls".

== Crime and drugs ==
By 1980, the project was "notorious", a high-crime area where "[e]verybody live[d] in fear". The Mickey Cobras gang dominated the complex during the 2000s. In 2006, following an undercover drug conspiracy bust, numerous people living at and near the housing project died of overdoses from a potent form of heroin. Raids followed the deaths and resulted in 30 gang members' being arrested at the complex. On August 11, 2013, two men were shot in the complex, leaving one dead and the other wounded.

== Renovation ==
From 2009–2010, The Chicago Housing Authority renovated the buildings, adding detailing—stone quoins and triangular ball-topped gables and metal porches—to give the original plain brick a neo-Georgian appearance, and has installed its first resident computer center there. The number of apartments will be reduced to 660.
