= Winton Place (Lakewood, Ohio) =

Coordinates: 41°29′35.9″N 81°46′43.8″W

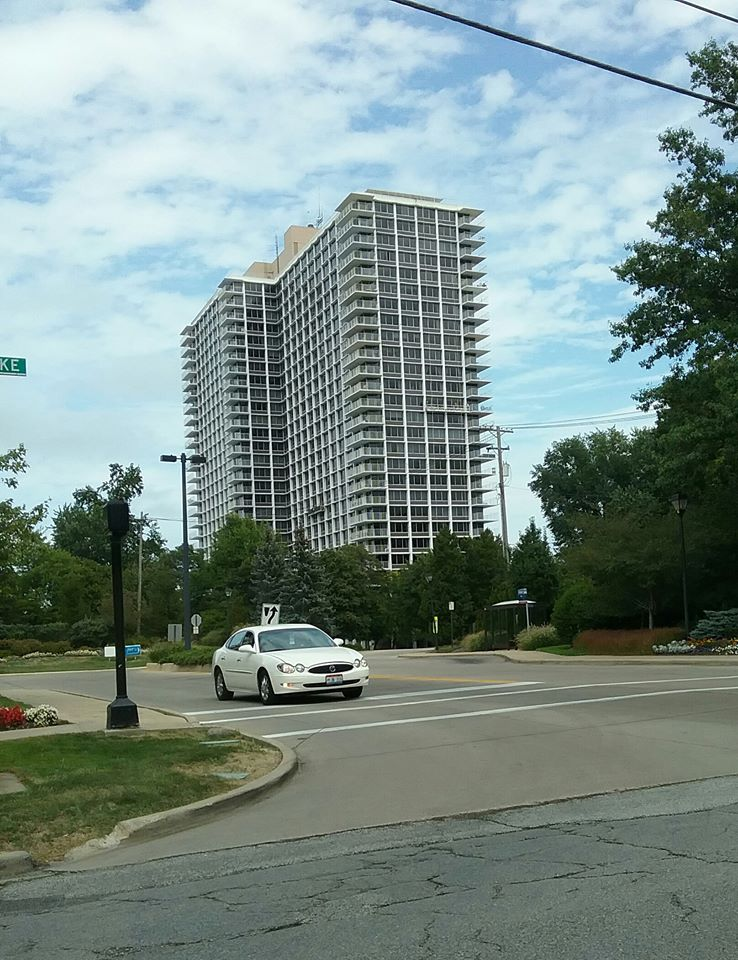
- Interactive map of the Winton Place area

General information
- Type: Residential
- Location: 12700 Lakewood, Ohio 44107 United States
- Construction started: 1962
- Completed: 1963

Height
- Roof: 80.50 m (264 ft)

Technical details
- Floor count: 28

Design and construction
- Architect: Loebl, Schlossman, Bennett & Dart

Winton Place is a 264-foot high-rise residential building in Lakewood, Ohio. It was named after automobile magnate Alexander Winton, who built a house for his family on the same land that the building occupies today. Designed by Cleveland engineering firm Arthur G. McKee Co. under the direction of engineering supervisor Karlis Maizitis and completed in 1963, it was the tallest apartment building between New York City and Chicago. Winton Place is one of the most exclusive and one of the highest views in an apartment in Greater Cleveland. Its construction cost $20 million ($210,326,087 today).

== See also ==
- Lakewood Gold Coast
