= Kristine Aono =

American artist (born 1960)

Kristine Yuki Aono
- Born: 1960 (age 65–66); Chicago, Illinois
- Education: Washington University in St. Louis, Skowhegan School of Painting and Sculpture
- Notable work: Cultural Inheritance, Rope Kimono, Relics from Camp, Deru Kugi Wa Utareru: The Nail That Sticks Up The Farthest Takes The Most Pounding
- Style: sculptures, Installation
- Website: http://kristineaono.com/home.html

Kristine Yuki Aono (born 1960) is an American artist from the Midwest of the United States. Her sister is artist Joanne Aono.

== Biography ==
Aono grew up in the northern neighborhood of Chicago in Edgewater, which at the time had a primarily Japanese-American demographic, at her great grandparents home. She later moved to Orland Park where the demographic was mostly European American. Aono grew up in a three-story flat complex filled with her relatives. Art had always been in her life, as Aono grew up in a household that used art as a medium to express themselves. She is a third generation Japanese-American referred to as Sansei.

== Influences ==
In 1983 Aono was beginning to take an interest in art when she discovered her Japanese ancestry. This discovery would also reveal her family’s history and cause her to reflect on her ethnic identity. The materials that she uses in her art consists of everyday items which she uses to communicate the issues of lost heritage and identity that is faced by Japanese Americans.

Aono bases her work off a concept, then chooses materials that are relative to creating an experience.

== School ==
College of Art at Washington University in St. Louis, Skowhegan School of Painting and Sculpture in Maine, residencies at the MacDowell Colony and Virginia Center for the Arts.

Art

She has several sculptures in her early work but is primarily known for installations. Her two earliest sculptures are "Cultural Inheritance" and "Rope Kimono", which were both released in the 1990s.

Aono approaches these objects and forms in a disciplinary manner to search and represent ethnic identity utilizing sociology, anthropology, history, and architecture.

In the 1990s, Aono’s works would use a different form of art called multimedia installations, where she takes ordinary objects and modernizes them in relation to Japanese American history. The history that she chooses to focus on is not only a part of her family’s history, but all Japanese Americans who experienced being placed in internment camps during World War II. Aono has commented on this, stating that “There’s a story behind each [object] and a person behind each story… The whole internment experience was about individual people… it wasn’t just this mass exodus.”

== Exhibitions ==
Sculptures

- Cultural Inheritance Wire mesh, thread, charcoal, gold leaf flakes, Japanese maple leaves, wood, plaster. 111 x 48 x 20"
- Josei Wire mesh, thread. 17 x 24 x 5"
- Twigs Wire mesh, twigs, thread 17 x 26 x 6"
- Cherry Tree Leaf Josei Wiremesh, cherry leaves, thread 17 x 24 6"
- Blue Dansei Wire mesh, thread, sewing needles, paint 16 x 48 x 6"
- Rope Kimono II DesignCast plaster, wire mesh, fabric, rope, Japanese and North American maple leaves, wood, pigment. 59 x 48 x 24"
- Obasan/Grandma Kimono Hydrocal plaster, wire mesh, fabric, photocopies, rice, barbed wire 52 x 26 x 15"
- Ghost Kimono Hydrocal plaster, wire mesh, fabric, gesso, ash 59 x 33 x 20"
- Kimono Hydrocal plaster, wire mesh, fabric, rope, leaves, pigment. 53 x 28 x 12'
- Leaf Kimono Wire mesh, branch with leaves, embroidery thread. 66 x 91 x 10"
- Sewn Kimono Wire mesh, sewing needles, metallic thread, aluminum rod. 66 x 72 x 4"
- Sakura Kimono Wire mesh, embroidery thread, branch, cherry tree leaves 66 x 75 x 10"
- Flag Kimono Wire mesh, thread, paint, aluminum rod 93 x 72 x 6"
- Formstone Roehouse Fish Fiberglass fish, Formstone bricks, clay, paint, metal chair, plastic flowers. 36 x 72 x 18"

Installations

- Relics from Camp
- And the Bride Wore….
- Deru Kugi Wa Utareru: The Nail That Sticks Up The Farthest Takes The Most Pounding
- Issei, Nisei, Sansei…
