= Mary and Leigh Block Museum of Art =

Museum in Evanston, Illinois

Block Museum of Art, Northwestern University
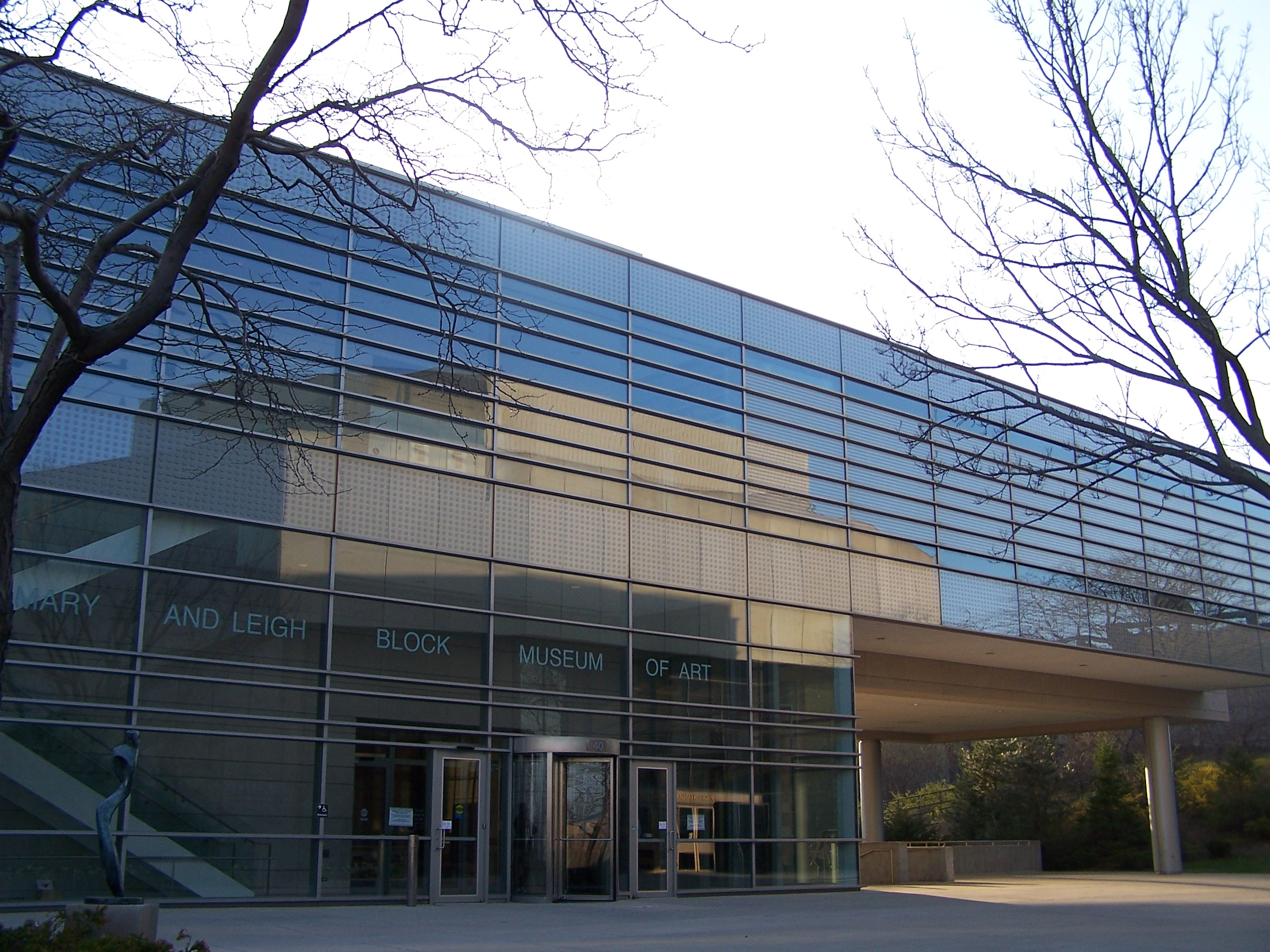

- Location within Chicago metropolitan area
- Established: 1980
- Location: 40 Arts Circle Drive; Evanston, Illinois; United States
- Coordinates: 42.0524°N 87.6727°W
- Type: Art
- Directors: Lisa Graziose Corrin (Since January, 2012)
- Architect: Loebl Schlossman & Hackl
- Website: www.blockmuseum.northwestern.edu

The Block Museum of Art is a free public art museum located on the campus of Northwestern University in Evanston, Illinois. The Block Museum was established in 1980 when Chicago art collectors Mary (daughter of Albert Lasker) and Leigh B. Block (former vice president of Inland Steel Company) donated funds to Northwestern University for the construction of an art exhibition venue. In recognition of their gift, the university named the changing exhibition space the Mary and Leigh Block Gallery. The original conception of the museum was modeled on the German kunsthalle tradition, with no permanent collection, and a series of changing temporary exhibits. However, the Block Museum soon began to acquire a permanent collection as the university transferred many of its art pieces to the museum. In recognition of its growing collection and its expanding programming, the Gallery became the American Alliance of Museums accredited Mary and Leigh Block Museum of Art in 1998. The Block embarked on a major reconstruction project in 1999 and reopened in a new facility in September 2000.

The Block Museum has strong partnerships with museums worldwide including with the Yale University Art Gallery, Princeton University Press, The Nasher Art Museum at Duke University, the Grey Art Gallery at NYU, and the Museum der Moderne Salzburg. The Block often collaborates with these museums on exhibitions that travel across the country and the world.

== Original exhibition highlights ==
- A Feast of Astonishments: Charlotte Moorman and the Avant-Garde, 1960s–1980s (January 16 – July 17, 2016)

Charlotte Moorman was a musician and performance artist and a champion of experimental art, whose avant-garde festivals in New York City brought new art forms to a broad public. Recognition of Moorman in art history has been limited mostly to her collaborations with other artists, including composer John Cage and pioneering multimedia artist Nam June Paik, and to her 1967 performance of Paik's "Opera Sextronique," for which she became known as the "topless cellist" after being arrested on indecency charges. A Feast of Astonishments used the artists archive to looks deeper to portray Moorman as a leading international figure in her own right. The exhibition traveled to New York University's Grey Art Gallery in Manhattan and to the Museum der Moderne Salzburg.

- If You Remember, I’ll Remember (February 4 – June 18, 2017)

This group exhibition of contemporary work included works by artists Kristine Aono (b. 1960), Shan Goshorn (b. 1957), Samantha Hill (b. 1974), McCallum & Tarry (active 1998–2013), Dario Robleto (b. 1972), and Marie Watt (b. 1967). The exhibition contemplated the present through works of art exploring themes of love, mourning, war, relocation, internment, resistance, and civil rights in 19th and 20th century North America.

- William Blake and the Age of Aquarius (September 23, 2017 – March 11, 2018)

This exhibition explored the impact of British visionary poet and artist William Blake on a broad range of American artists in the post-World War II period. This exhibition was the first to consider how Blake's art and ideas were absorbed and filtered through American visual artists from the end of World War II through the 1960s.Blake's radical vision influenced artists of the Beat generation and 1960s counterculture. Among the artists, musicians, and writers who looked to Blake were such diverse figures as Diane Arbus, Jay DeFeo, the Doors, Sam Francis, Allen Ginsberg, Jess, Agnes Martin, Ad Reinhardt, Charles Seliger, Maurice Sendak, Robert Smithson, Clyfford Still, and many others. This exhibition also explored visual cultures around such galvanizing moments of the 1960s as Woodstock and the Summer of Love.

- Paint the Eyes Softer: Mummy Portraits from Roman Egypt (January 13 – April 22, 2018)
- Up is Down: Mid-Century Experiments in Advertising and Film at the Goldsholl Studio (September 18 – December 9, 2019)

In the 1950s, Chicago-based design firm Goldsholl Design Associates made a name for itself with innovative "designs-in-film." Headed by Morton and Millie Goldsholl, the studio produced television spots, films, trademarks, corporate identities, and print advertisements for international corporations like Kimberly-Clark, Motorola, and 7-Up. Although they were compared to some of the most celebrated design firms of the day, the Goldsholls and their designers are relatively unknown today. The Block Museum's exhibition Up is Down reexamined the innovative work of Goldsholl Design Associates and its national impact.

- Caravans of Gold, Fragments in Time: Art, Culture, and Exchange across Medieval Saharan Africa (January 26 – July 21, 2019)

Presenting more than 250 artworks spanning five centuries and a vast geographic expanse, the exhibition features loans from partner institutions in Mali, Morocco, and Nigeria, many of which will be seen in North America for the first time. The Block Museum exhibition was curated by Kathleen Bickford Berzock and traveled to The Aga Khan Museum in Toronto (Sept. 21, 2019 – Feb. 23, 2020) and then to the National Museum of African Art, Smithsonian Institution (April 8 – Nov. 29, 2020)

== Museum building and sculpture garden ==
The original museum building was constructed in 1980 and was designed by Chicago architecture firm Loebl Schlossman & Hackl. The Block's outdoor sculpture garden was established in 1989. Sixteen sculptures were gifts to Northwestern University by donors Mary and Leigh Block and other supporters. They are located outdoors and in indoor public spaces around Northwestern's Arts Circle, as well as in a sculpture garden designed by renowned Chicago architect John Vinci.

The Block embarked on a major reconstruction project in 1999 and reopened in a new facility in September 2000, with a design by Chicago architectural firm Lohan Associates. Designed by acclaimed Chicago architect Dirk Lohan (the grandson of Ludwig Mies van der Rohe), and substantially funded by a private donation from businessman, lawyer, and philanthropist Paul Leffmann, the glass, steel and limestone structure tripled the size of the original facility. The 2000 expansion tripled the museum's gallery size. The Block Museum is now home to three

In 2015, the museum launched a public lobby lounge known as The Block Spot, equipped with Wi-Fi, seating, study spaces and meeting spots. Block Spot was created with James Geier, president and co-founder of Chicago's award-winning 555 International, and with input from undergraduates in industrial designer and adjunct lecturer John Hartman's industrial design projects class at the Segal Design Institute, based at the McCormick School of Engineering and Applied Science.

== Museum Collections ==
The Block Museum houses a growing permanent collection of over 6,000 artworks. The collection is strong in prints, drawings, and photographs by American and European modern and contemporary artists. Specialized collections include American computer-generated artworks, Chicago-based printmakers of the 1930s and ‘40s, documentary photography of the Midwest, and South African prints of the early 1990s. Since 2016, The Block has increased the diversity of media and the international array of artists represented in its collection. Recent gifts and purchases have included videos, sculpture, drawings, photographs and installations by internationally known contemporary artists such as Paul Chan, Omar Victor Diop, Felix Gonzalez Torres and Carrie Mae Weems. An active teaching collection, the Block Museum's works are used in exhibitions, in wide-ranging curricula across the university, by students and faculty across disciplines, and by scholars and researchers regionally and nationally.

The Block Museum collection can be browsed online via the museum's website. To view objects from the collection, the public can make an appointment in The Eloise W. Martin Study Center.

=== Collection highlights ===
- Jasper Johns, Decoy, 1971
- Max Beckmann, On the Streetcar, 1922
- Barbara Hepworth, Two Forms (Divided Circle), 1969
- Jean Arp, Feuille Se Reposant (Resting Leaf), 1959
- Joan Miró, Monument Dresse En Plein Ocean a La Gloire du Vent, 1967 and Constellation, 1971
- Chuck Close, Alex/Reduction Block, 1993
- Carrie Mae Weems, Ritual and Revolution, 1998
