= Joanne Aono =

Japanese-American artist

Joanne Tomi Aono
- Born: Chicago, Illinois
- Education: Drake University
- Occupation: Artist
- Known for: Japanese calligraphy
- Website: http://joanneaono.com

Joanne Aono is a Japanese-American artist. Her art features Japanese calligraphy, and consists mainly of diptychs expressing modern minimalism. She resides in the Lakeview neighborhood of Chicago.

== Life ==
Aono received her B.F.A. from Drake University in Iowa, and has also studied at the School of the Art Institute in Chicago.

An identical twin (Kristine Aono, also a fellow artist) and one of four sisters, she grew up in the Edgewater neighborhood of Chicago. Her grandparents immigrated to the United States from Japan, making her a member of the sansei generation.

== Work ==
Her work was informed in part by Japanese calligraphy. Her style combines modern minimalism with traditional Japanese minimalism. It typically combines "atmospheric water imagery, realistically rendered objects and obscured text."

In her work, Aono first inscribes boards by hand and then overlays them with graphite, paint or pastel, using drawing tools such as chopsticks. The surface of the image mimics the effect of water.
