= Stateway Gardens =

Buildings in Chicago, Illinois (1955–2007)

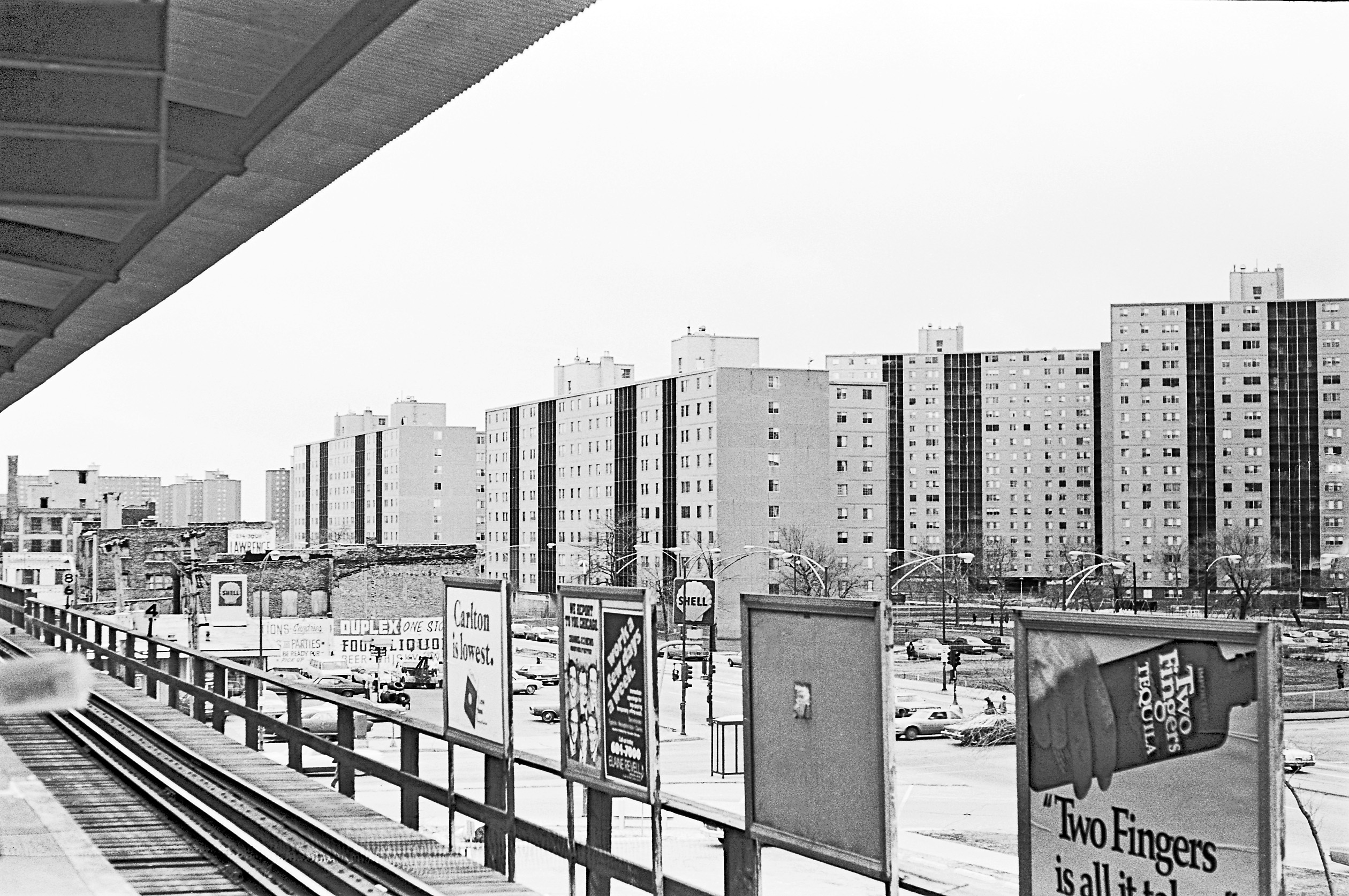
- Stateway Gardens in 1979, from the (now) 35th-Bronzeville-IIT stop (CTA Green Line)
- Interactive map of Stateway Gardens

General information
- Location: Bounded by 35th Street, Pershing Road, State Street, and Federal Street; Chicago, Illinois, United States
- Coordinates: 41°49′38″N 87°37′40″W
- Status: Demolished

Construction
- Constructed: 1955–58

Listing
- Demolished: 2001–2007

Other information
- Governing body: Chicago Housing Authority

Stateway Gardens was a Chicago Housing Authority (CHA) public housing project in the Bronzeville neighborhood on the South Side of Chicago, Illinois, alongside the Dan Ryan Expressway just north of the former Robert Taylor Homes, and part of the State Street Corridor that also included Dearborn Homes, Harold Ickes Homes and Hillard Homes. Stateway Gardens consisted of mid- and high-rise apartment buildings.

Finished by the late 1950s, Stateway Gardens was plagued by a large amount of gang violence, organized crime, and drug abuse. The area gradually became more neglected and underserved by city authorities and the Chicago Police Department which led to mass abandonment and urban decay. It was completely demolished by 2007.

== Construction ==
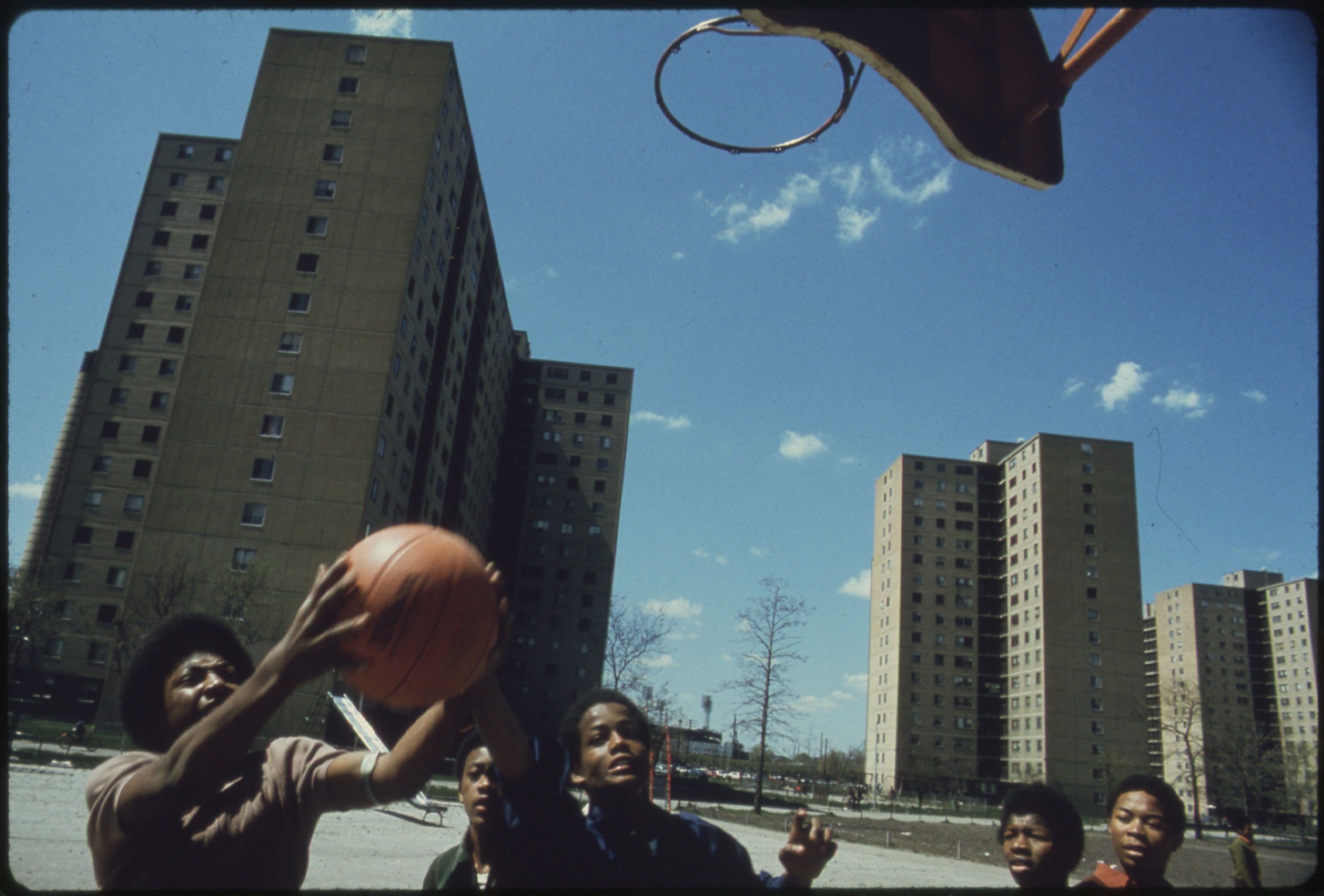
African-American youths play basketball in the Stateway Gardens high-rise housing project in 1973.

In 1955, construction at Stateway Gardens commenced, with 1,644 units planned in eight high-rise buildings. The total cost for the project was $22 million. Three years later, construction was complete and approximately 3,000 people moved in. In 1978, a major CHA renovation plan costing $106.2 million was undertaken. This project rehabilitated Stateway Gardens, Robert Taylor Homes and most of the ABLA Homes on Chicago's Near West Side.

== Problems and crime ==
In August, 1984, Stateway Gardens was within the six poorest U.S. census tracts, according to a Roosevelt University study. Cabrini–Green on the North Side ranked seventh in the same study. Amid rising crime in CHA developments in the early 1980s, the Chicago Police Department launched a Public Housing Crime Unit to replace private security guards at those sites. In 1988, (prior to the forming of the CHA Police Department) the South Side's Wentworth Police District (which included Stateway Gardens and the Robert Taylor Homes) had 67 homicides, the highest of any district in the city. Stateway Gardens was infamous for its high rate of violent crime and drug activity through the late 1990s.

== Reorganization ==
The federal government created Housing Opportunities for People Everywhere (known as HOPE VI) in 1993 as a way to provide funds for cities to demolish dilapidated public-housing units and replace them with mixed-income communities. In 1987, federal officials seized control of all Chicago Housing Authority holdings and property amid allegations of corruption and graft. The CHA would remain under federal receivership until 2010.

== Demolition ==
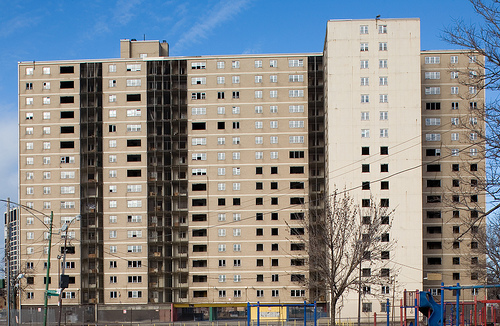
2007 photograph of the last remaining building of the Stateway Gardens public housing project preparing for demolition.

In 1996, demolition of Cabrini–Green began. This marked the start of what eventually came to be known as the Chicago Housing Authority's Plan for Transformation. One year later, demolition began at the Robert Taylor Homes. In 2000, the CHA formally approved the 10-year Plan for Transformation to remake public housing and demolition began at Stateway Gardens in 2001. In October 2006, families living in the last remaining building (3651–53 S. Federal St.) at Stateway Gardens were scheduled to leave. The building was finally demolished in June 2007, making way for Phase 1 of the mixed income development Park Boulevard, half of which was already completed prior to the demolition and resident relocation processes. The CHA used its One Strike department to determine who would quality for Section 8 relocation.

== Notable residents ==
- Ronnie Lester, University of Iowa All American, NBA Player for Chicago Bulls and Los Angeles Lakers, NBA Scout for Los Angeles Lakers and Phoenix Suns.
