= Harold L. Ickes Homes =

Former public housing development in Chicago, Illinois, United States

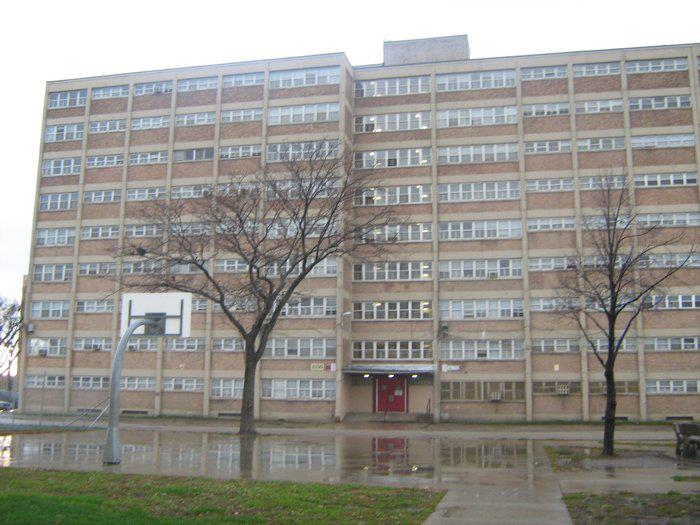
- 2008 photograph of one of the Harold L. Ickes Homes housing project buildings
- Interactive map of Harold L. Ickes Homes

General information
- Location: Bordered by Cermak Road, 24th Place, State Street, and Federal Street; Chicago, Illinois; United States
- Coordinates: 41.8508°N 87.6280°W
- Status: Demolished

Construction
- Constructed: 1954–55

Listing
- Demolished: 2009–11

Other information
- Governing body: Chicago Housing Authority

Harold L. Ickes Homes was a Chicago Housing Authority (CHA) public housing project on the Near South Side of Chicago, Illinois, United States. It was bordered between Cermak Road to the north, 24th Place to the south, State Street to the east, and Federal Street to the west, making it part of the State Street Corridor that included other CHA properties: Robert Taylor Homes, Dearborn Homes, Stateway Gardens and Hilliard Homes.

== History ==
Named for a United States administrator and politician, Harold LeClair Ickes. The housing project was constructed by the Public Works Administration between 1954 and 1955. It consisted of eleven 9-story high-rise buildings with a total of 738 apartments . In 2007, Ickes residents recorded acts of police harassment which included strip searches of African-American men as children watched; The footage aired on NBC's Channel 5. On October 9, 2007, Rev. Jesse Jackson along with ministers from Chicago's west side and community members moved into the housing project to bring attention to the harassment situation.

== Redevelopment ==
As of May 2015, most of the site remains undeveloped following its demolition as part of the Plan for Transformation/Plan Forward. In September 2013, two years after the final building was demolished, former residents called for the housing authority to build replacement housing as promised. One former resident was quoted as saying: "We were told by the CHA that once the Ickes was torn down replacement units would then be built. That has not happened even though taxpayers' money is being used to help build a new Green Line station on Cermak Road and a new stadium for DePaul."

== Education ==
Residents were zoned to schools in the Chicago Public Schools including John C. Haines School in Chinatown and Phillips Academy High School. Students from Ickes used a tunnel to get to Haines.
