= Takeshi Aono (baseball) =

Japanese baseball player (born 1983)

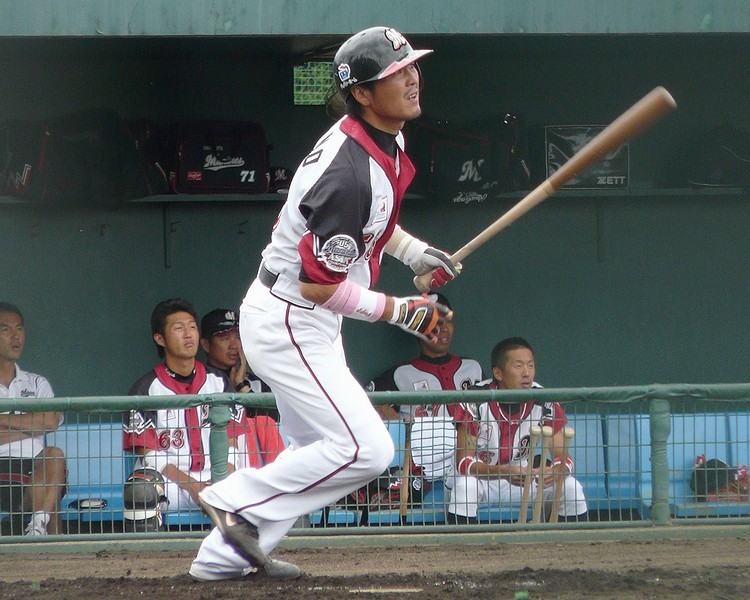
- Infielder
- Born: January 12, 1983 (age 43)
- Batted: Right Threw: Right

NPB debut
- May 12, 2002, for the Chiba Lotte Marines

Last appearance
- 2012, for the Chiba Lotte Marines

NPB statistics
- Batting average: .247
- Home runs: 17
- RBI: 58
- Stats at Baseball Reference

Teams
- Chiba Lotte Marines (2002, 2006–2007, 2010–2012)

Takeshi Aono (青野 毅, born January 12, 1983, in Bonotsu, Kagoshima) is a Japanese former professional baseball infielder for the Chiba Lotte Marines in Japan's Nippon Professional Baseball. He played in 2002, and from 2006 to 2007 and from 2010 to 2012.
