= Robert Taylor Homes =

Buildings in Chicago, Illinois (1962–2007)

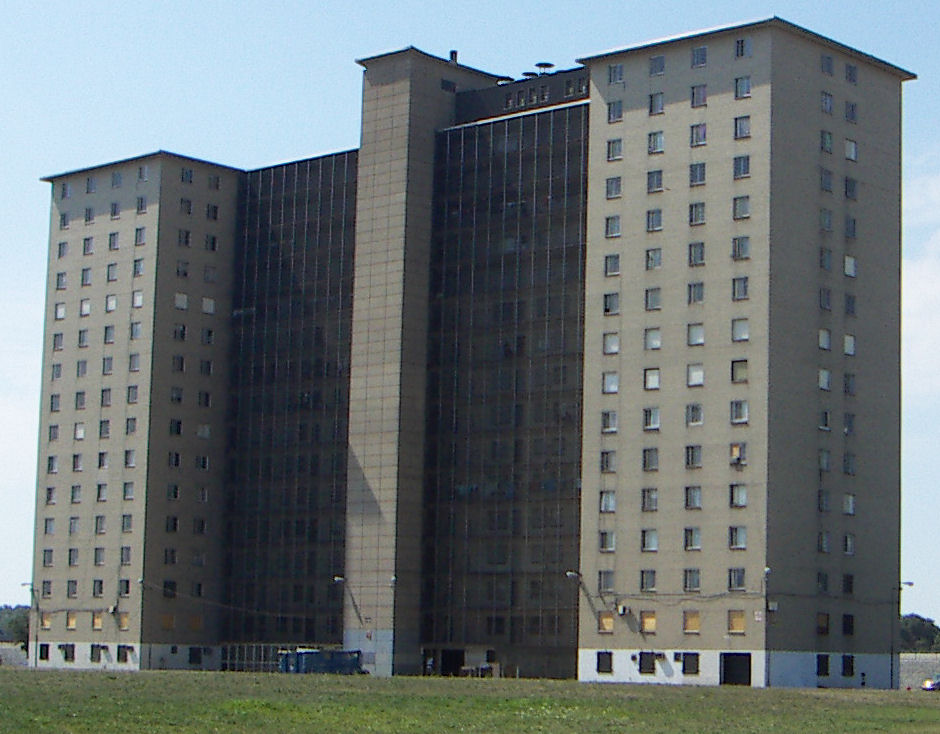
- 2005 photograph of the last remaining Robert Taylor Homes (building 22).
- Interactive map of Robert Taylor Homes

General information
- Location: Bordered by Pershing Road, 54th Street, State Street, and Federal Street; Bronzeville, Chicago, Illinois; United States
- Coordinates: 41°48′45″N 87°37′39″W
- Status: Demolished

Construction
- Constructed: 1961–62

Listing
- Demolished: 1998–2007

Other information
- Governing body: Chicago Housing Authority

Robert Taylor Homes was a public housing project located in the Bronzeville neighborhood on the South Side of Chicago, Illinois. Constructed in 1962 and demolished by 2007, it was the largest housing project in the United States and even the world at some point. The development consisted of 28 high-rise buildings arranged in a linear formation spanning about two miles (3 km) along State Street, between Pershing Road (39th Street) and 54th Street, east of the Dan Ryan Expressway. The buildings were typically grouped in sets of three, forming horseshoe-shaped configurations within each block.

Named after Robert Rochon Taylor, the development was part of the State Street Corridor, a concentration of Chicago Housing Authority (CHA) housing developments that also included Stateway Gardens, Dearborn Homes, Harold Ickes Homes, and Hilliard Homes.

== History ==
Robert Taylor Homes were completed in 1962 and named after Robert Rochon Taylor (1899–1957), an African American activist and member of the Chicago Housing Authority (CHA) board. In 1950, Taylor resigned from the CHA board after the city council refused to approve proposed housing sites across Chicago that would have supported racially integrated housing. At its peak, Robert Taylor Homes was the largest public housing development in the United States. The complex consisted of 28 high-rise buildings, each 16 stories tall, containing a total of 4,415 housing units. The buildings were primarily arranged in U-shaped clusters of three and extended along a two-mile (three-kilometer) stretch. The development could house more than 27,000 residents.

== Disinvestment ==
Like other high-rise public housing developments in Chicago, such as Cabrini–Green, Robert Taylor Homes was subject to municipal disinvestment, which led to widespread poverty, infrastructure neglect, illegal drug activity, and violence associated with gangs. Originally designed to accommodate about 11,000 residents, the population at its peak reached around 27,000. At one point, six of the poorest U.S. census tracts with populations over 2,500 were located within the development.

Many residents relied on public assistance as their sole source of income, with about 95 percent of the population unemployed, including non-working-age children. Roughly 40 percent of households were headed by single women earning less than $5,000 per year. Around 96 percent of residents were Black.

The physical conditions of the buildings reflected prolonged neglect, with many structures bearing fire damage and surrounded by littered streets. Building code enforcement was minimal, and there were few commercial or civic amenities in the area. Safety concerns were prominent, and police officers often reported being targeted by gunfire from the high-rises and avoided patrolling poorly lit hallways.

A survey found that many households had a family member who was incarcerated or expected to return from prison within two years. These dynamics complicated relocation efforts, as returning individuals often faced barriers related to family responsibilities, mental health issues, or housing eligibility.

=== Gang violence and drugs ===
The Mickey Cobras (MCs), Gangster Disciples (GDs), and Black Disciples (BDs) were active gangs within the Robert Taylor Homes. According to the Chicago Police Department, many homicides in the area were attributed to conflicts between these groups, as they competed for control of territory and drug distribution in various Chicago neighborhoods. The CHA estimated that about $45,000 worth of drug transactions occurred daily within the development.

Former residents reported that disputes among drug dealers often centered around control of specific buildings. During one weekend, over 300 separate shooting incidents were reported in the vicinity of the Robert Taylor Homes.

=== Crime ===
Crime in the Robert Taylor Homes, mostly associated with drug trade and gang-related violence, peaked in the mid-1970s.

Notable incidents include the October 1976 case of 22-year-old Denise Dozier, who was thrown from the 15th floor of an apartment building and survived. On June 25, 1983, 18-month-old Vinyette Teague was abducted from the development after her grandmother briefly left her unattended in a hallway. Despite an estimated 50 people being present in the hallway at the time, police were unable to identify a suspect, and the child was never found.

On August 15, 1991, CHA police officer Jimmie Haynes was fatally shot by a sniper at the development. He died two days later at Mercy Hospital and Medical Center, and three people were later charged in connection with his death. In February 1993, a maintenance worker was beaten to death by gang members after providing police access to a building where a gang meeting was taking place.

== Redevelopment ==
In 1993, a decision was made to replace the Robert Taylor Homes with a mixed-income community consisting of low-density buildings. This initiative was supported by a United States Department of Housing and Urban Development block grant through the HOPE VI program. In 1996, additional HOPE VI funds were allocated for off-site replacement housing for former residents of the development.

The Chicago Housing Authority completed the move of all residents by the end of 2005. The final high-rise building was demolished on March 8, 2007. As of that year, redevelopment plans included the construction of about 2,300 low-rise homes and apartments, along with seven new or renovated community facilities and various retail and commercial spaces. The total estimated cost of the project was $583 million. The area undergoing redevelopment was renamed "Legends South."

== Notable residents ==
The Robert Taylor Homes were home at one time to:

- Mr. T (Lawrence Tureaud), actor and former wrestler.
- Kirby Puckett, baseball player.
- Deval Patrick, 71st Governor of Massachusetts.
- Corey Holcomb, comedian and actor.
- Open Mike Eagle, Hip-hop artist.
- Ronnie Lester, University of Iowa All American, NBA Player for Chicago Bulls and Los Angeles Lakers, NBA Scout for Los Angeles Lakers and Phoenix Suns.
- Beauty Turner, writer and community activist.
- Maurice Cheeks, basketball player.
- Skee-Lo (Antoine Roundtree), american rapper and producer.
- Kenny Duckworth, Kendrick Lamar's father.
- Michael Colyar, comedian and actor.
- Derrius Quarles, Entrepreneur and author
- DJ Slugo, American DJ and music producer credited as one of the founders of the Ghetto house sound.

== Research ==
The Robert Taylor Homes provided a setting for studying the effects of urban living and limited access to green space on human behavior. Research in environmental psychology conducted by Frances Kuo and William Sullivan of the Landscape and Human Health Laboratory (formerly the Human-Environment Research Laboratory) at the University of Illinois at Urbana–Champaign focused on these aspects.

The history and social dynamics of the development were also examined by Sudhir Venkatesh in his book American Project (ISBN 0-674-00830-8). In his 2008 book Gang Leader for a Day, Venkatesh documented the lives of residents and described a gang referred to as the "Black Kings," a pseudonym likely alluding to the Gangster Disciples.

Author Alex Kotlowitz addressed broader issues within Chicago public housing in There Are No Children Here, which centers on the Henry Horner Homes but also discusses conditions and policies affecting other developments in the city.

The Robert Taylor Homes were featured in a PBS documentary, Crisis on Federal Street, which aired nationally in August 1987.
