= Nehemia Azaz =

Israeli sculptor

Nehemia Azaz נחמיה עזז
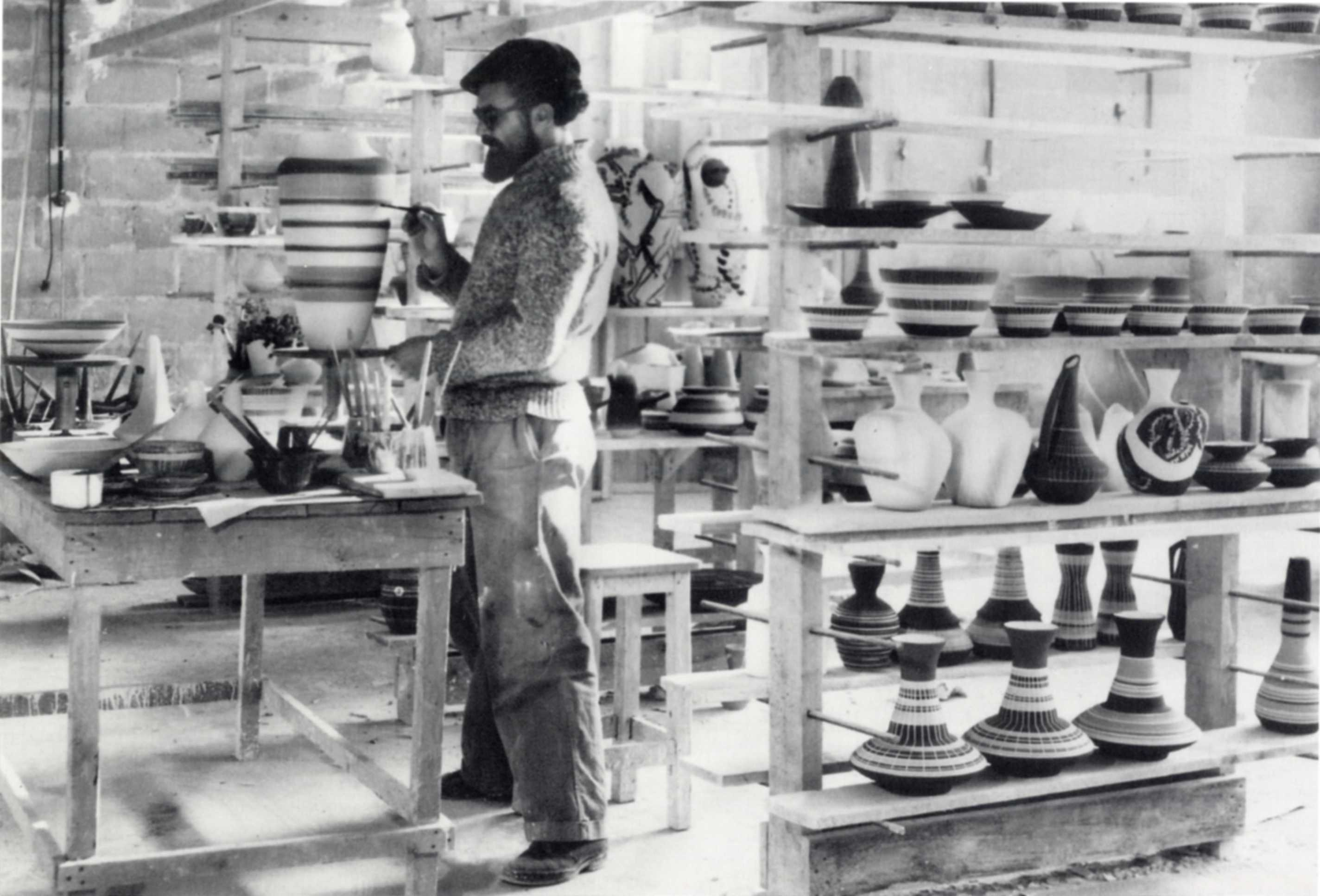
- Azaz in the late 1950s at Harsa, Beersheba
- Born: 9 October 1923; Berlin, Germany
- Died: 27 October 2008 (aged 85); Oxfordshire, England, UK
- Known for: Sculpture, stained glass, ceramics

Nehemia Azaz (Hebrew: נחמיה עזז), also Nehemiah, Henri or N H Azaz (9 October 1923 – 27 October 2008), was an Israeli sculptor, ceramicist and architectural artist, who spent half of his working life in the UK. Best known in Israel as founder of the Department of Artistic Ceramics at the Harsa factory in Beersheba, Azaz made his studio base in Oxfordshire, England from the late 1960s onwards, working in stained glass, wood, concrete, bronze, brass, copper and aluminium.

== Biography ==
Born in 1923 and taken to the British Mandate of Palestine at an early age, Azaz's early career developed alongside, and in relation to, the formation of the state of Israel. He was the founder and first director of the Department of Artistic Ceramics at the Harsa factory in Beersheba in 1955 where he designed the first generation of ceramics. His private ceramic work featured in an exhibition at Wakefield Gallery in 1955, alongside L S Lowry and Josef Herman; his ceramic sculpture is included in London's Victoria & Albert Museum collection. He was also jewellery designer for collections exported through the Maskit initiative of Ruth Dayan and others. In 1960 he left Harsa to concentrate on large-scale architectural sculpture and stained glass. Influenced by the art of 1950s/60s, he was just as much inspired by the natural forms of the desert, mythology and the human condition.

After a highly successful and high-profile architectural art commission at the Sheraton Hotel in Tel Aviv in 1965, he became one of the first Israeli sculptors of his generation to be commissioned internationally. Later, at the invitation of Yitzhak Rabin, then Israeli Ambassador in Washington, DC, Azaz - living in UK as artist in residence at Carmel College, UK, carved a 30 square metre walnut wood wall for the Israeli Lounge (along with a ceiling mural by artist Shraga Weil and painted fabric by Ezekiel Kimche) at the John F. Kennedy Center for the Performing Arts.

His career as an architectural and stained glass artist then continued largely in US and UK, where he made his studio base and home in Oxfordshire from the late 1960s onwards. There are a number of large scale public art pieces still in existence, including at the Loop Synagogue in Chicago; Belfast Synagogue, Pace University in Manhattan NY and in the Israel Lounge at the John F Kennedy Centre in Washington, DC.

Azaz was the grandfather of Irish professional footballer Finn Azaz.

== Artistic career ==
=== Studio pottery and design ===
After his time in Europe, Azaz returned to Israel to take up the position of head of the ceramic art department at Harsa in Beersheba. Joined by young and enthusiastic artists such as Dan Arbeid, he designed and made sculptural pottery artworks influenced by the contours, shapes and colours of the desert, and also designed pieces that were made and decorated by others. The idea of Maskit was to enable émigré craftspeople to adapt their skills and Azaz was instrumental in their training and encouragement.

=== Stained glass windows ===
Azaz's first commercial stained glass was a commission on board the Zim Lines cruise liner S/S Moledet, which routinely sailed between New York and Haifa in the early 1960s. His technique of using pieces of intensely coloured glass, became a hallmark in his other glasswork commissions. Large stained glass window projects include synagogue windows at Carmel College, praised by art and architecture scholar Nikolaus Pevsner as using "extraordinary technique with rough pieces of coloured glass like crystals" and by Historic England as "brilliant and innovative artistic glass"; at Marble Arch Synagogue (over a period of 17 years); at Headington Hill Hall, once the former HQ of Pergamon Press, (now part of Oxford Brookes University campus) in Oxford, UK and at Temple Sholom in Chicago. Azaz's influence in glass work was also seen in his collaboration with the Shafrir Glass works, where he consulted on designs for household glassware.

=== Carved wood sculpture ===
Carving large wood sculpture has been a feature of Azaz's career from his earliest sculpting period, and wood is also one of his preferred materials for small maquettes of his large-scale bronze work. The largest wooden piece, entitled Old Testament Musical Instruments, a 30 square metre carved walnut wall gifted by the State of Israel, is located in the Israeli Lounge at the John F Kennedy Center for the Performing Arts in Washington DC. Several other carved wooden pieces still in existence are located in public institutions in Israel including the Chaim Sheba Medical Centre at Tel-Hashomer.

=== Large scale architectural commissions in concrete ===
Azaz's architectural work appeared in early on his career, as features of a rapidly growing Tel-Aviv in the 1960s and 1970s featuring on civic buildings and incorporated into the fabric of new constructions such as the Sheraton Hotel, Plaza Hotel, Hilton Hotel, Architects and Engineering Associates Building and Hennig House Diamond Center, Ramat-Gan. In the United States, several large concrete commissions followed, including 'THE FORM MAKERS' at Sherman House Hotel in Chicago (then rededicated to Dominican University, IL but subsequently retired in 2008).

=== Metallic sculpture ===
Azaz was self-taught in respect of working and finishing different metals. His commissions span iron, copper, bronze, aluminum, brass and silver with several listed on the Smithsonian American Art Museum, Art Inventories Catalog. 'HANDS OF PEACE' at the Loop Synagogue in Chicago, and 'BROTHERHOOD OF MAN' at Pace University in New York. Also, Belfast Synagogue, St Barbara Church, designed by Stephan Legge (de) & Ursula Legge-Suwelack in Röhlinghausen, Essen, Germany and the Kol Ami Museum at the North Suburban Synagogue Beth El in Illinois.

Smaller bronze sculpture also feature strongly throughout Azaz's career. Using lost styrofoam (polystyrene) or lost-wax casting, he realised a large collection of bronze work evolving from industrial style pieces in the 1960s to figurative and mythical based pieces in the 1980s making up part of the portfolio displayed at the International Contemporary Art Fair in 1986

=== Optical art ===
Azaz created his own optical art variants, using painted canvas, plate metal or acrylic and aluminium, rods and tubes. Some of the earliest pieces are still held at the Warwick Arts Centre in the UK and in collection of Guy's and St Thomas' Charity Fine Art and Heritage Collection.

=== Exhibitions ===
Exhibitions included: Wakefield Gallery (with LS Lowry and Josef Herman) 1955; Grosvenor Gallery, London 1965; Camden Arts Centre, London 1966, Galerie Semiha Huber, Zurich 1966; Galerie Artek, Helsinki 1967; Pavilion of Judaism, Expo 67; International Contemporary Art Fair, London 1986; Mabat Art Gallery, Tel-Aviv 1987.

== See also ==
- Israeli ceramics
