= Hilliard Towers Apartments =

Residential building in Chicago, Illinois

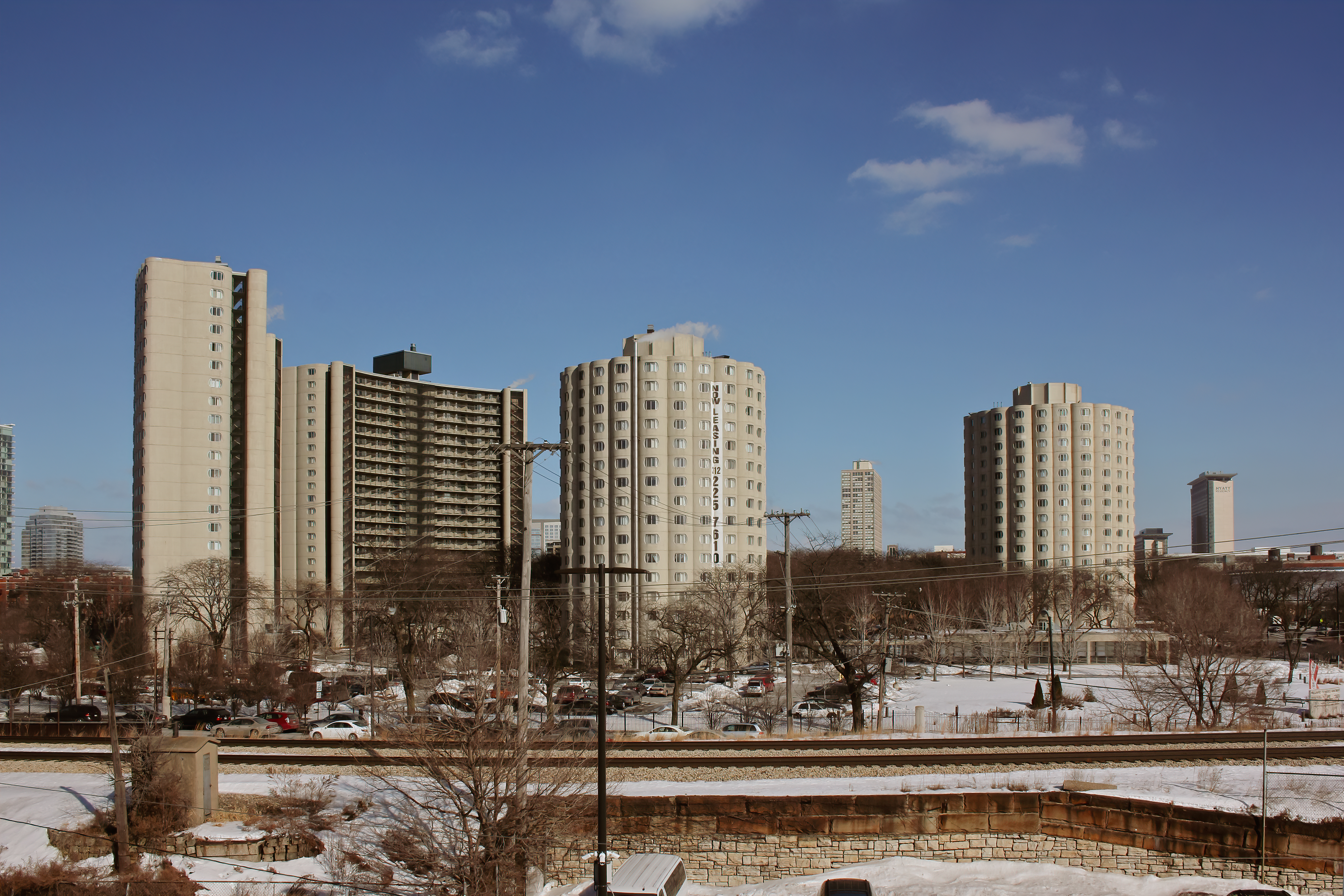
- Hilliard Towers Apartments in 2015
- Interactive map of the Hilliard Towers Apartments area

General information
- Architectural style: Modern architecture
- Location: 2013 South Clark Street, Near South Side, Chicago, Illinois, US
- Coordinates: 41°51′14.1″N 87°37′42.6″W
- Construction started: 1963; 63 years ago
- Completed: 1966; 60 years ago
- Renovated: 1997–2006
- Owner: Chicago Housing Authority

Technical details
- Material: Concrete

Design and construction
- Architect: Bertrand Goldberg

Other information
- Public transit: Red (Cermak–Chinatown); Green (Cermak–McCormick Place)

Website
- thecha.org/property/hilliard-homes
- Raymond M. Hilliard Center Historic District
- U.S. National Register of Historic Places
- U.S. Historic district
- NRHP reference No.: 99001072
- Added to NRHP: September 13, 1999

Hilliard Towers Apartments, formerly known as the Raymond Hilliard Homes CHA housing project, is a residential high-rise development in the Near South Side of Chicago, Illinois. It was designed by Bertrand Goldberg and is bounded by Clark Street, State Street, Cullerton Street, and Cermak Road. In 1999, it was placed on the National Register of Historic Places as the Raymond M. Hilliard Center Historic District. The development was named for Raymond Marcellus Hilliard, who was the director of the Cook County Department of Welfare from 1954 until his death in 1966.

== Construction ==
Design began in 1963, with the increasing demand for affordable public housing and urban renewal projects growing in popularity throughout the country. Bertrand Goldberg designed four concrete buildings supported almost exclusively by their outer shells as opposed to their cores, which is incorporated in Marina City. His opinion of other public housing projects was that they were developed in such a way as to punish residents for being poor; Goldberg wanted to design a home that residents would be proud of. Residents were vetted carefully and as a result, crime and social problems at Hilliard Homes were considerably lower than at other CHA housing projects. It was the only project never to require a uniformed police detail. The twin cylindrical towers were reserved for seniors, and the two adjoining half-circle buildings were reserved for low-income families.

== Redevelopment ==
By the early 1990s, the buildings had fallen into disrepair. In 1997, the CHA initiated a process of financing and redevelopment that spanned 9 years, ending in 2006. The property is currently mixed-income, with a combination of middle-class residents paying market rate, plus low-income families and senior citizens with Section 8 vouchers.
