= Four Houses by Architect Frederick Schock =

Historic district in Chicago, Illinois

Coordinates: 41°53′25.3″N 87°46′13.1″W

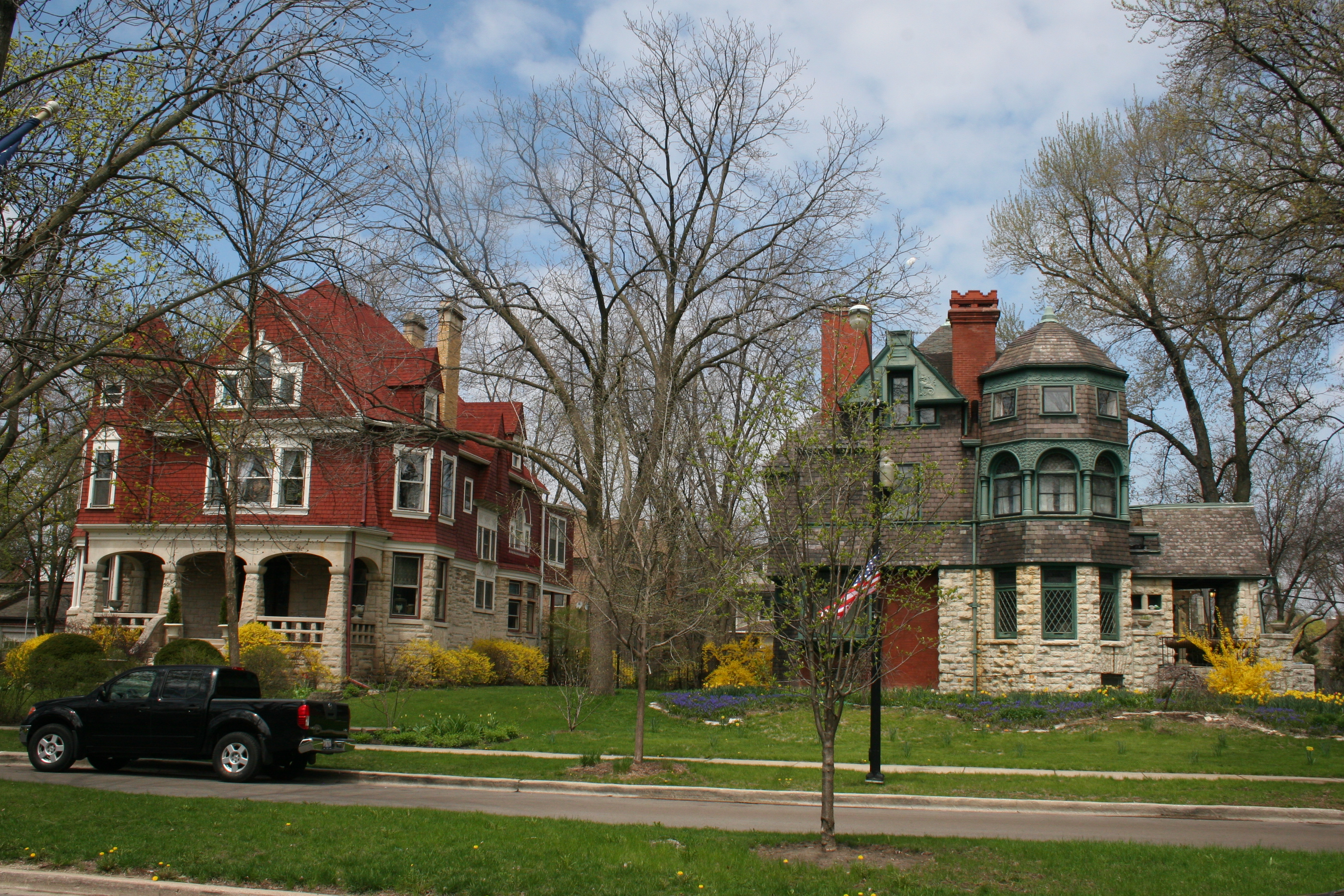
- Two of the four houses, the F. R. Schock House, and the Beeson House
- Interactive map of the Four Houses by Architect Frederick Schock area

General information
- Architectural style: Queen Anne and Shingle style
- Location: 5749 & 5804 West Race Avenue; 5804 & 5810 West Midway Park, Chicago, Illinois, United States
- Completed: 1886 - 1892

Design and construction
- Architect: Frederick R. Schock

Chicago Landmark
- Designated: January 20, 1999

The Four Houses by Architect Frederick Schock is a historic district in Chicago's west-side Austin neighborhood, honoring four homes built by architect Frederick R. Schock between 1886 and 1892. The Queen Anne and Shingle styles houses are located at 5749 and 5804 West Race Avenue, and 5804 and 5810 West Midway Park.

The houses were designated as a Chicago Landmark district on January 20, 1999. The Commission on Chicago Landmarks added a historical marker in honor of the four homes at the intersection of Race and Menard avenues.

== Beeson House and Coach House ==
The Beeson House at 5810 W. Midway Park was built for Fredrick Beeson, the president of the Chicago Veneer Company.

== F.R. Schock House ==
The architect lived in this residence at 5804 W. Midway Park until 1931.

== Marie Schock House ==
The Marie Shock house was built in 1888 for the architect's mother. It is located at 5749 W. Race Ave.

== Schlect House ==
The Schlect House was built in 1887 for Catherine Schlect, the architect's aunt. It is located at 5804 W. Race Ave.

Gallery
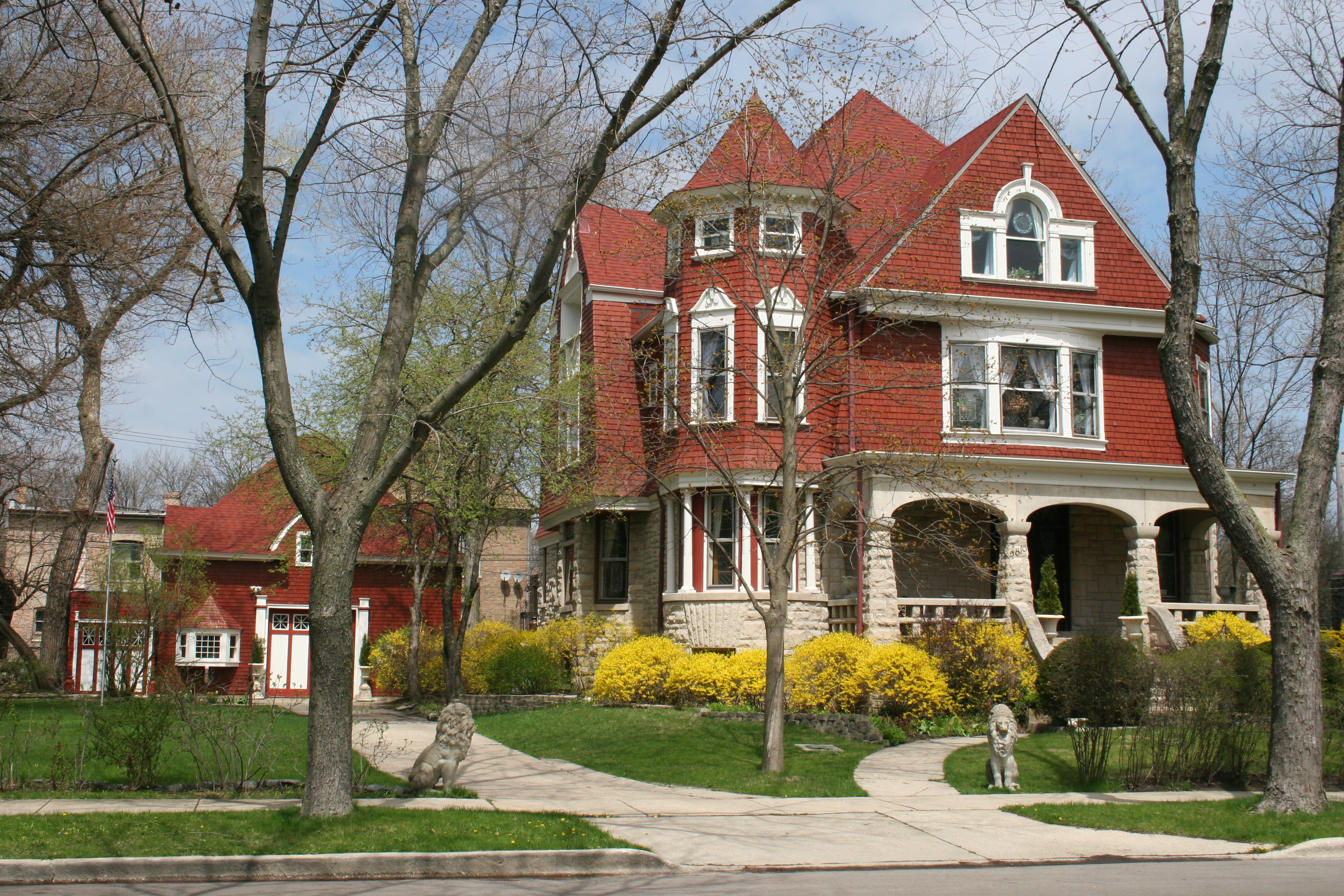
Beeson House and Coach House

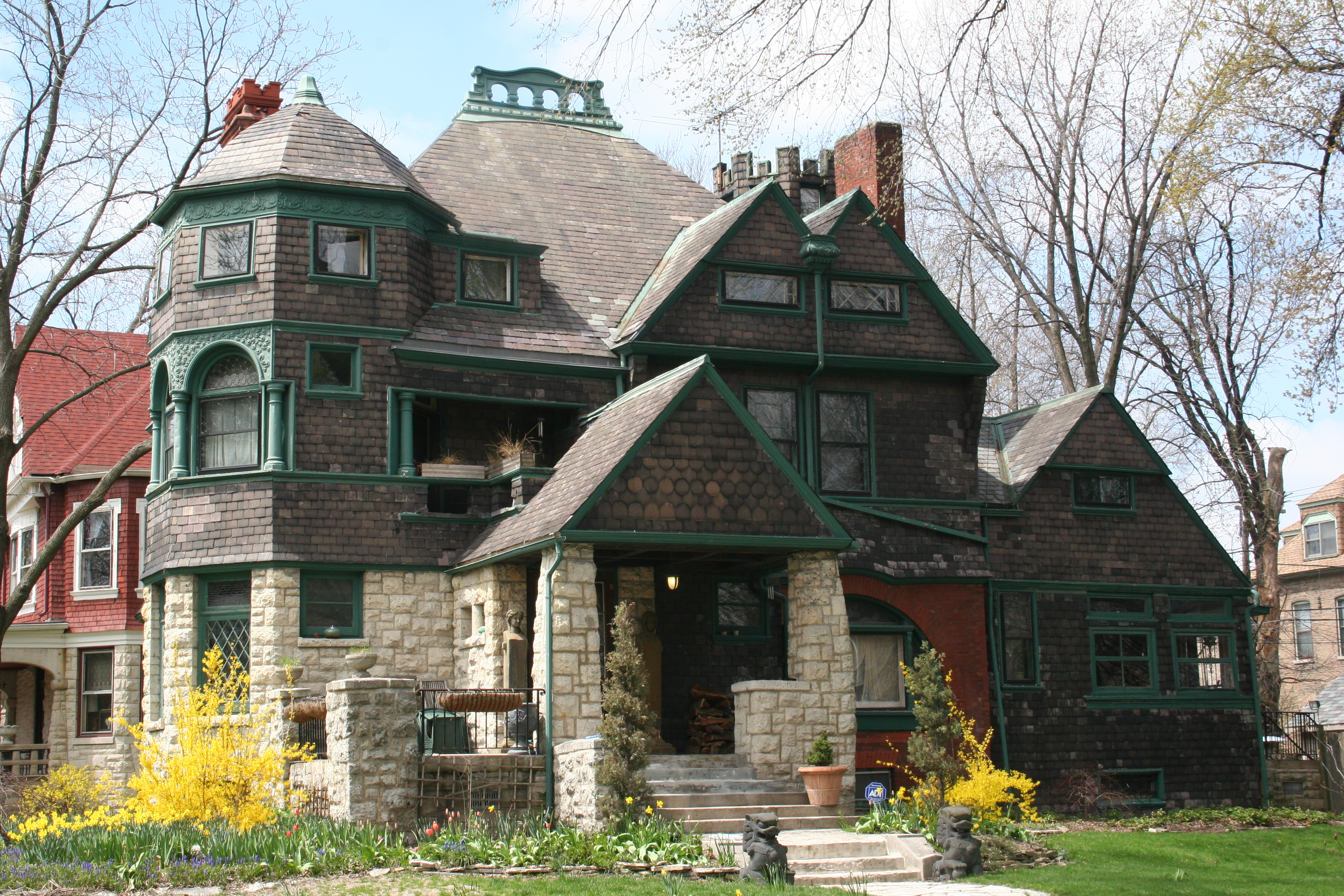
Schock, F R House

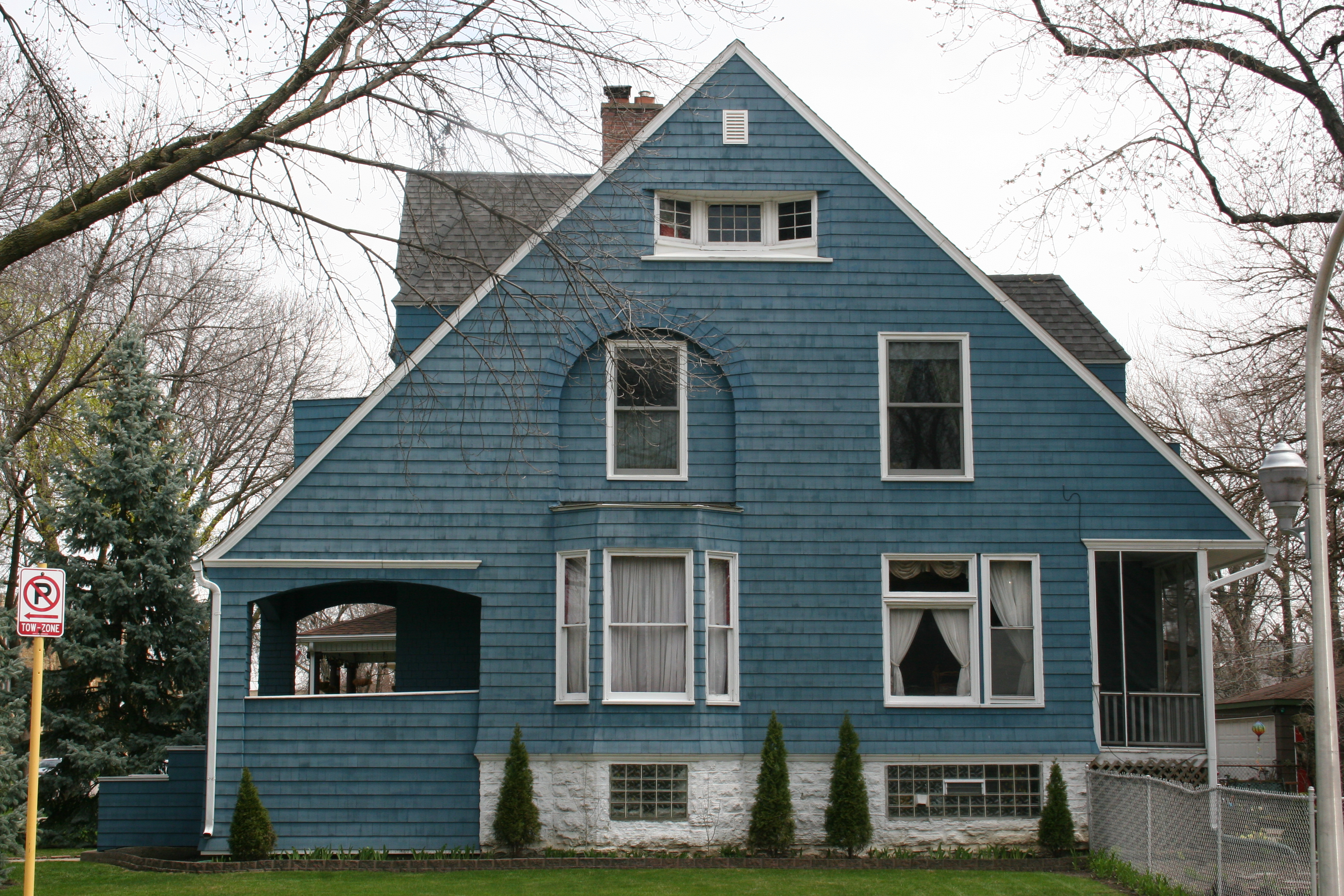
Marie Schock House

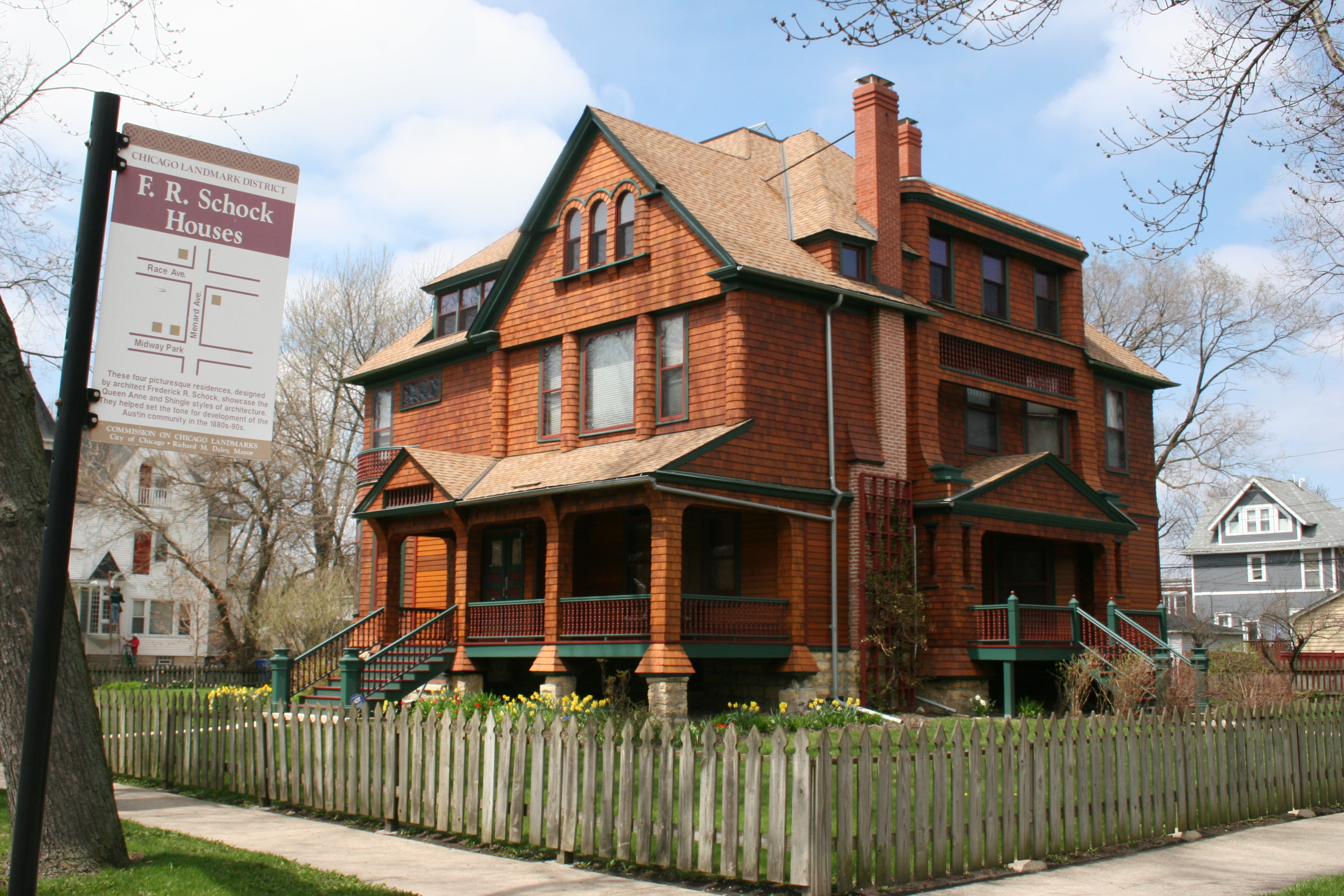
Schlect House
