= Tom Tuohy (attorney) =

American lawyer

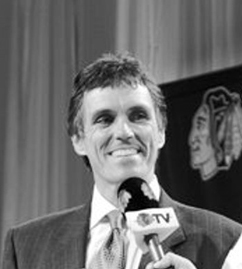
- Tuohy speaking at a Dreams for Kids press conference.
- Born: June 17, 1957 (age 69); Chicago, Illinois, United States
- Education: DePaul University, DePaul University College of Law, University of Cambridge, Kellogg School of Management, Stanford Graduate School of Business
- Occupation: Attorney
- Known for: Founder of Dreams for Kids and Tuohy Law Offices

Tom Tuohy is an American attorney, author, and philanthropist. He is the founder of Dreams for Kids, a nonprofit youth empowerment organization, and of Tuohy Law Offices. He has authored two books, Kiss of a Dolphin (2006) and Dreams for Kids, Changing the World...One Person at a Time (2010).

== Early life ==
Tom Tuohy was born June 17, 1957, in the Austin neighborhood of Chicago. He grew up during the era of white flight in the city. Following his father's departure from the family, he was raised by his mother, Patricia Tuohy, along with his three older siblings.

== Education and career ==
At the age of 19, Tuohy began his studies at DePaul University while working as a law clerk. He graduated with a B.S. in marketing in 1979 and earned a Juris Doctor from the DePaul University College of Law. In 1981, he received a certificate in international law from the University of Cambridge. He is an executive scholar of the Kellogg School of Management and attended the Executive Program for Nonprofit Leaders at the Stanford Graduate School of Business.

During college, Tuohy met Jesse White, founder of the Jesse White Tumbling Team, who became a mentor. White introduced Tuohy to the conditions in Chicago's Cabrini Green housing project, which influenced Tuohy's later philanthropic efforts. Tuohy serves on the executive boards of the Jesse White Tumbling Team and the Jesse White Scholars.

== Professional activities ==
In 1982, Tuohy established Tuohy & Associates, now Tuohy Law Offices, in Chicago. From 1983 to 1984, he served as a Special Assistant Attorney General for Illinois. His practice focuses on estate planning and personal injury law. He is a member of the U.S. Supreme Court Bar and has been an adjunct professor of social entrepreneurship at the Kellstadt Graduate School of Business at DePaul University.

In 2016, Tuohy founded Comprehensive Benefits of America, LLC, a social enterprise providing financial wellness benefits to gig economy workers, labor unions, and credit union members.

== Philanthropy: Dreams for Kids ==
Tuohy founded Dreams for Kids in 1989. The organization began its outreach at Clara's House, a shelter in Englewood, Chicago. Dreams for Kids provides youth empowerment and entrepreneurship training to underserved students. In 2022, the organization merged with UrbanX Learning.

== Featured media ==
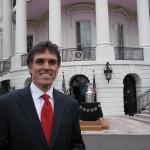
Tom Tuohy at a White House event with the Chicago Blackhawks and Dreams for Kids.

- 2012, Chicago Lawyer Magazine profile.
- 2013, American Family Insurance profile.
- 2014, Guerin Prep Distinguished Alumni, Walter Davenport Award.
- 2019, ABC Chicago interview on youth entrepreneurship.
