= Rooth =

Rooth is a surname.

The Rooth family crest is characterized by a deer lying underneath a tree.

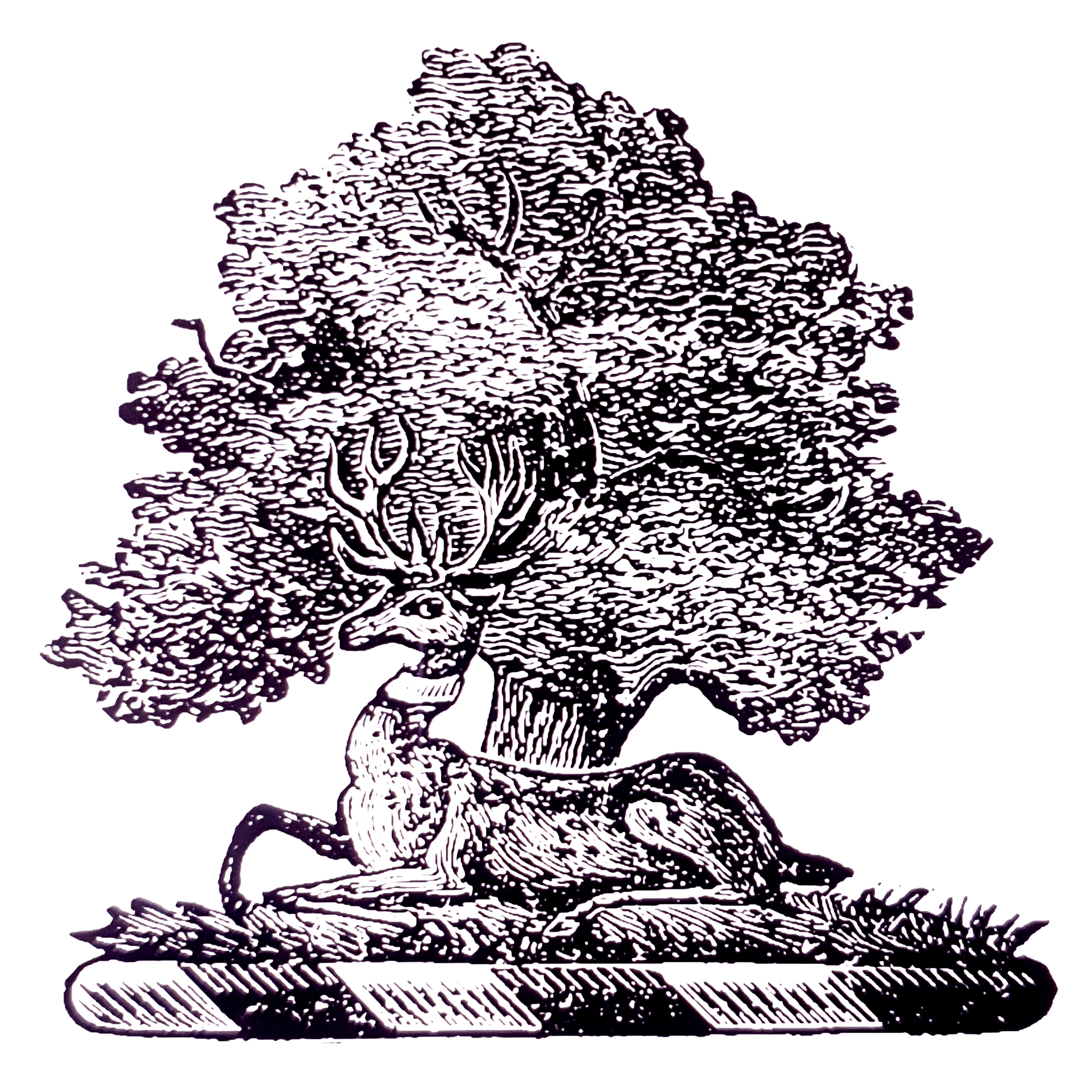
The crest of the Rooth family

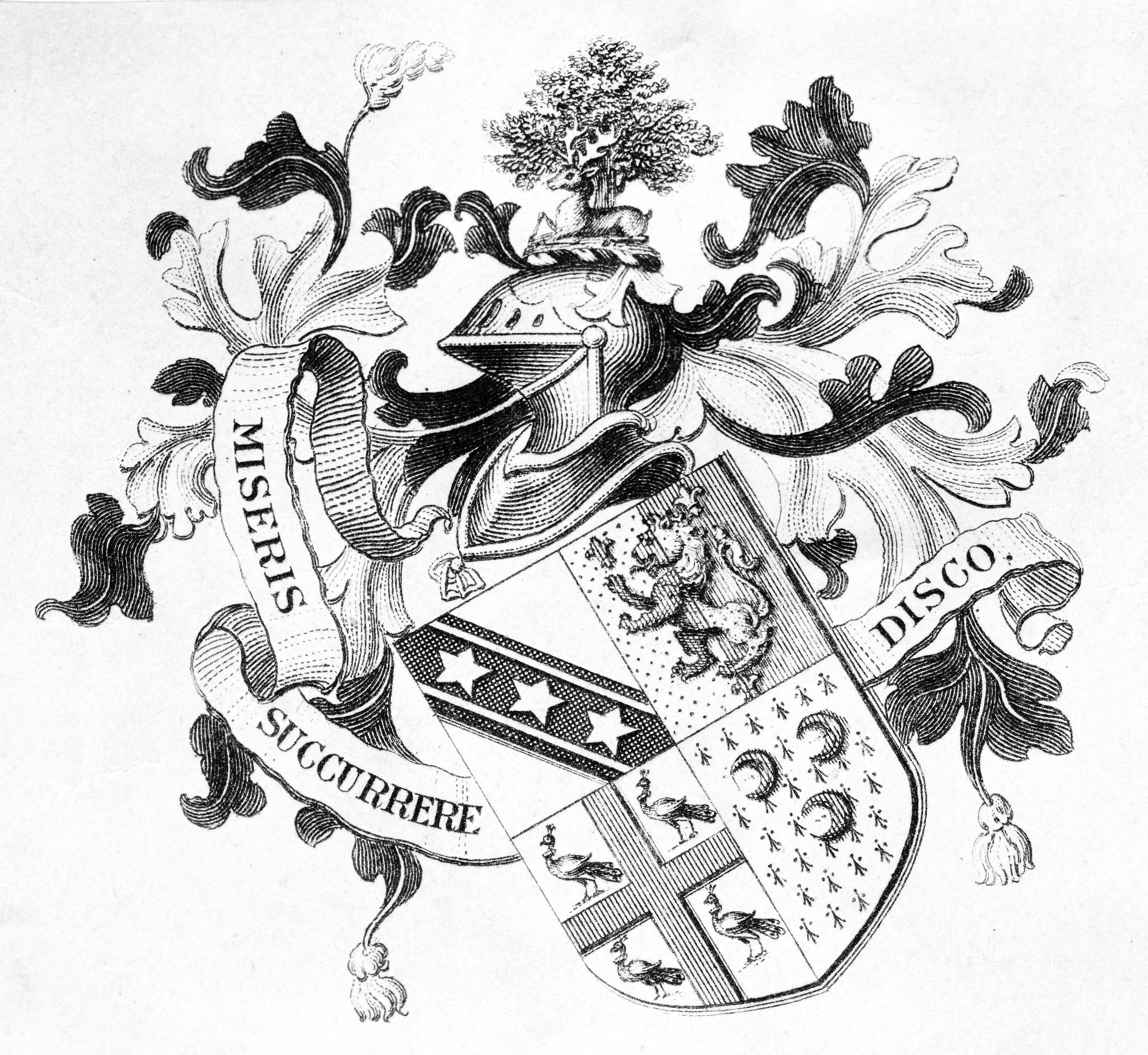
The quartered Rooth coat of arms, with the Rooth crest visible. The coat of arms bears the words 'miseris succurrere disco' meaning 'learn to succor the poor'.

Notable people with the surname include:

- Andrea Rooth (born 2002), Norwegian hurdler
- Gösta Rooth (1918–2008), Swedish physician
- Ivar Rooth (1888–1972), Swedish lawyer and economist
- James Augustus Rooth (1868–1963), British Royal Army Medical Corps officer
- Maria Rooth (born 1979), Swedish ice hockey player
- Markus Rooth (born 2001), Norwegian decathlete
- Robert Rooth, American lawyer
