= Medway Park =

Medway Park may refer to:

- Medway Park Sports Centre, a sports complex in Gillingham, Kent, England
- Midway Park, Chicago, a sub-neighborhood of Austin in Chicago, Illinois
