= Robert Rooth =

American lawyer

- Born: United States
- Education: Indiana University (BA); Washington University in St. Louis; DePaul University College of Law
- Occupation: Lawyer
- Known for: Nursing Home Abuse Attorney
- Website: www.roothlawfirm.com

Robert Rooth is the president and founder of The Rooth Law Firm, known for representing injured victims in nursing home neglect, medical malpractice and personal injury.

== Education ==
Rooth holds a Bachelor of Arts degree from Indiana University (1981). He attended law school at Washington University School of Law and DePaul University College of Law, earning his Juris Doctor degree in 1984.

== Legal career ==
Rooth trained under the American trial lawyer; Leonard M. Ring, from 1982 to 1987.

His focus is on representing injured victims in medical malpractice, nursing home neglect, and personal injury cases. He was involved in high-profile cases such as the Cline Avenue Bridge Collapse Litigation, the Achille Lauro litigation, and several others.

He is a member of the Illinois Trial Lawyers Association, the American Association for Justice and the Illinois State Bar Association. He is past president of the Chiaravalle Montessori School Board of Trustees and the Team Evanston Soccer Club.

== See also ==
- Medical law
- Personal injury law
- Personal injury lawyer
- Medical malpractice in the United States
