= Hitchcock House =

Hitchcock House may refer to:

- Hitchcock Estate, Millbrook, New York
- Hitchcock House (Chicago, Illinois)
- Reverend George B. Hitchcock House, Cass County, Iowa
- George and Martha Hitchcock House, Farwell, Michigan
