= Henry W. Austin =

American politician and businessman

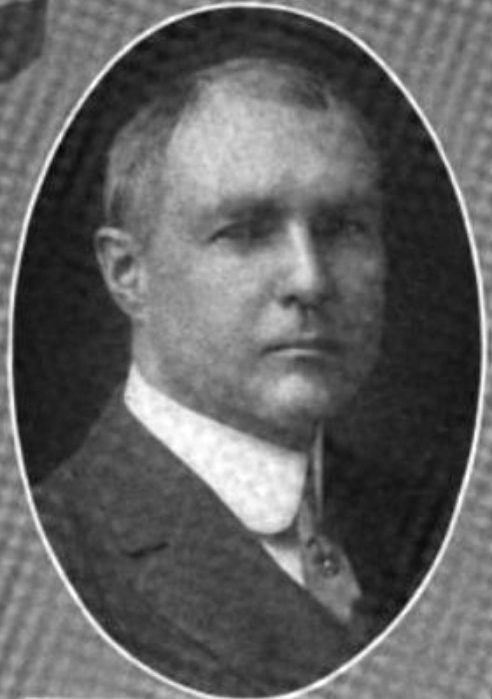

Member of the Illinois House of Representatives
- In office 1902–1910

Member of the Illinois Senate
- In office 1914–1922

Personal details
- Born: Henry Warren Austin; January 22, 1864 Oak Park, Illinois
- Died: June 25, 1947 (aged 83) Oak Park, Illinois
- Party: Republican
- Education: Williams College
- Occupation: Businessman, politician

Henry Warren Austin (January 22, 1864 – June 25, 1947) was an American politician and businessman.

== Biography ==
Austin was born in Oak Park, Illinois. He went to the Oak Park and Chicago public schools. Austin also went to Williams College. He served as the president of the Oak Park Trust and Savings Bank. Austin also served as president of the Cicero, Illinois School Board and as treasurer of the village of Oak Park. Austin served in the Illinois House of Representatives from 1903 to 1909 and in the Illinois Senate from 1915 to 1923. He was a Republican. His father Henry W. Austin Sr. also served in the Illinois General Assembly. Austin died at his home in Oak Park, Illinois from heart problems.
