= Henry W. Austin Sr. =

American politician and businessman

Henry Warren Austin Sr. (August 1, 1828 – December 24, 1889) was an American politician and businessman.

== Biography ==
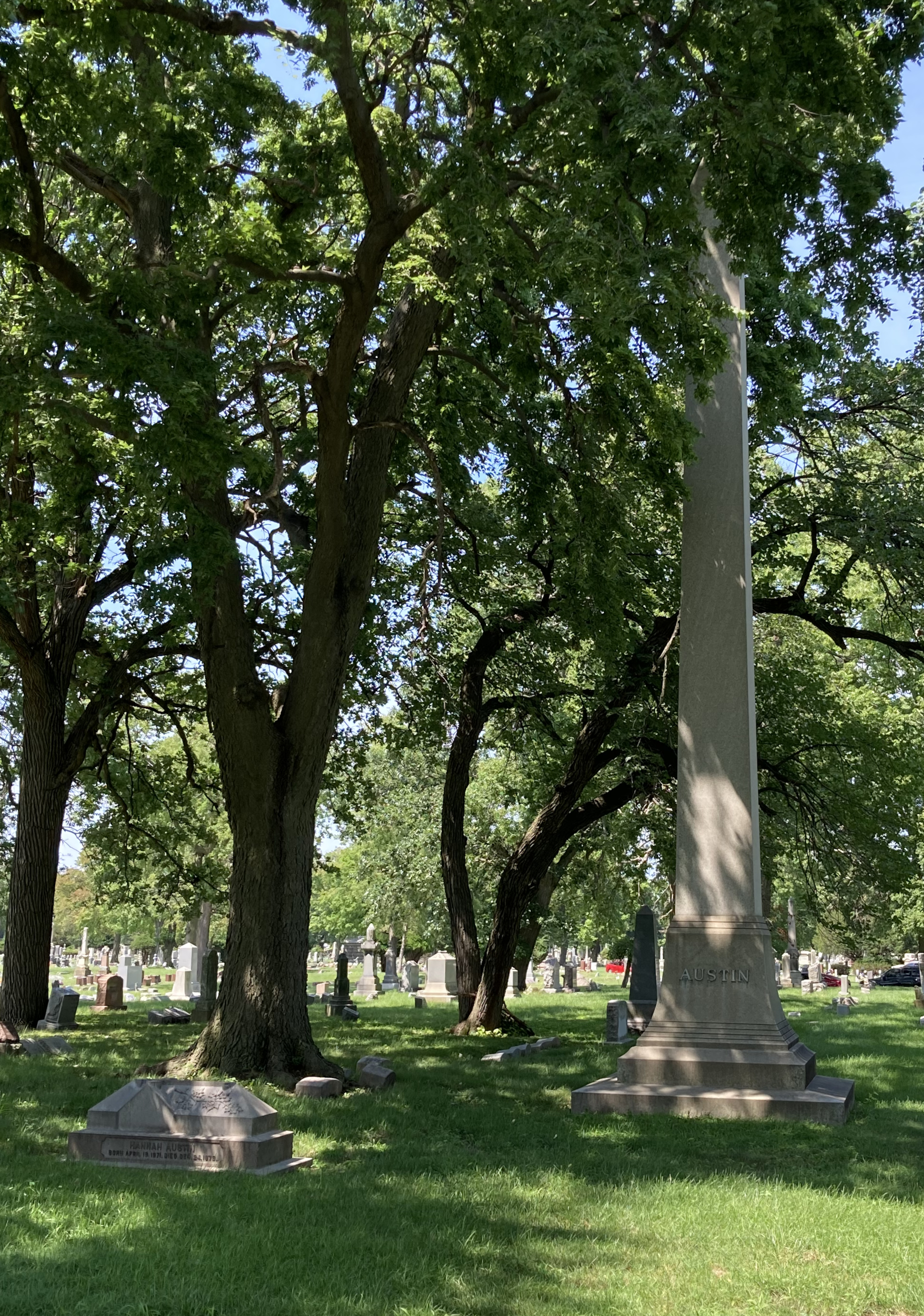
Austin's grave at Forest Home Cemetery

Austin was born in Onondaga County, New York. He moved to Illinois and settled in Oak Park, Illinois. He helped found the community of Austin. Austin was involved in the mercantile business.

He served in the Illinois House of Representatives in 1871 and 1872 and was a Republican. In 1884, he ran for the office of Illinois Treasurer on the Prohibition Party ticket and lost the election.

He died of heart failure at his home in Oak Park, Illinois. His son Henry W. Austin also served in the Illinois General Assembly. Both are buried at Forest Home Cemetery in Forest Park.
