= Robert A. Clifford =

American lawyer

Robert A. Clifford (1950 or 1951) is a Chicago trial lawyer and principal partner at Clifford Law Offices. Clifford's firm specializes in "personal injury, medical malpractice, mass torts, consumer and health care fraud, product liability, and aviation and transportation disasters." He attended DePaul University for both his undergraduate degree from the College of Commerce and Juris Doctor, finishing in 1976. The firm was founded in 1984 to represent plaintiffs in personal injury and wrongful death cases. The DePaul University College of Law was renamed in his honor following a US$30 million donation made by him and his wife Joan on 26 October 2026.

== Education and early career ==
Clifford, as a young attorney, was the protégé of Phillip H. Corboy who was considered a legend of Chicago law.

== Notable cases ==
- Rachel Barton Pine, an internationally acclaimed violinist, was dragged almost 300 feet along the tracks of a commuter rail train when the doors of the train closed on her bags, pinning her to the doors. Clifford Law Offices secured a $29.6 million jury verdict on her behalf. After appeals, the final amount paid out was $35 million.
- Clifford Law Offices obtained a $75 million settlement for the victims injured when the scaffolding collapsed at the John Hancock Building in Chicago.
- Faulty construction on the 12th floor of the Cook County Administration Building was found to be the cause of six deaths and sixteen injuries in a 2003 fire. Clifford Law Offices served as lead counsel for the plaintiffs and obtained a $100 million settlement.
- One of Clifford's clients is a former lawyer who was hurt in a car crash while riding in a taxicab in 2005. They sued the cab company, Yellow Cab Affiliation Inc., for $26 million. A jury found the cab company liable for the incident and awarded the verdict to Clifford's client. Within hours after the jury entered their verdict, the parent company of the cab company filed for Chapter 11 bankruptcy.

== Settlement payments law ==
In February 2013, the Illinois Senate introduced Senate Bill 1912, which was passed by both chambers of the General Assembly and signed into law by the then-Governor Pat Quinn (Public Act 98-548). The bill was pushed by the Illinois Trial Lawyers Association (ITLA). Opposing the law were the Illinois Association of Defense Trial Counsel (IDC), the Illinois Insurance Association and the Property Casualty Insurers Association of America. The law requires defendants who settle lawsuits to tender a release to the plaintiff within 14 days of the settlement agreement; and pay the settlement within one month of receiving the executed release.

The president of ITLA said that the idea for the law came from Clifford, who is a past president of ITLA.

== Campaign contributions ==
=== Fifth District Appellate Court ===
In the fall of 2016, Clifford gave campaign contributions to Jo Beth Weber, a Democratic candidate for the Fifth District Appellate Court. She raised most of her money from two law firms that conduct business within the Madison County court system. The Fifth District Appellate Court webpage, as of February 2017, shows Weber's opponents as still remaining on the court, indicating that she lost her race.

=== Illinois Supreme Court ===
==== Background ====
On September 12, 2016, the Illinois Supreme Court chose Justice Lloyd Karmeier as its new chief justice. Around the same time, U.S. District Judge David Herndon certified a class action lawsuit against State Farm for $9 billion related to Karmeier's 2004 election. The lawsuit alleges that State Farm secretly supported Karmeier's 2004 election in exchange for Karmeier overturning a $1 billion judgment against State Farm. That judgment stemmed from a trial in Williamson County that found State Farm liable for supplying inferior car parts for crash repairs.

In 2005, the Illinois Supreme Court reversed the $1 billion judgment against State Farm. Ever since that decision, lawyers have claimed that both State Farm and Philip Morris funneled cash through various channels in order to conceal contributions to Karmeier's 2004 campaign.

Plaintiff's attorneys who sued Philip Morris lost their case and twice tried unsuccessfully to reverse their loss at the Illinois Supreme Court, using allegations of illegal campaign contributions to Karmeier. Lawyers who lost the State Farm case, however, took their case to federal court. The lawyers filed a racketeering suit against State Farm in 2012. The suit sought to recover the judgment with triple damages and interest. The case went to District Judge David Herndon.

==== Negative ad campaign contribution ====
In October 2014, with Karmeier on the ballot, lawyers in five states raised $2,070,000 for a television campaign accusing Karmeier of selling justice. Robert Clifford contributed $250,000. Karmeier won the election to keep his seat on the court.
