= Schlect House =

House in Illinois, United States

Coordinates: 41.8903°N 87.7703°W

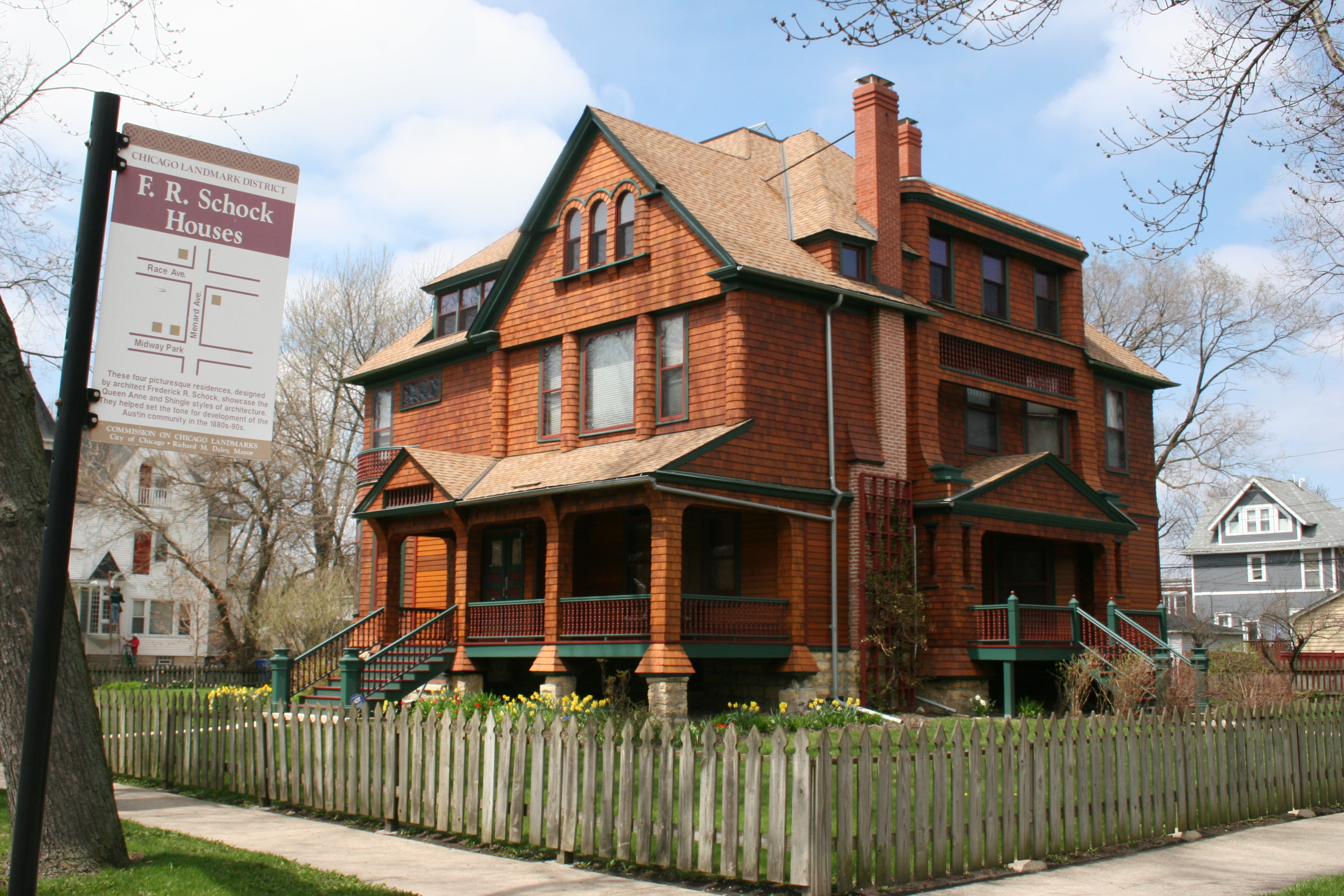
Schlect House with Four Houses Landmark sign in Chicago, IL

The Schlect House is a Shingle Style house at 5804 West Race Avenue in Chicago, Illinois, United States. The house was built in 1887 by Fredrick R. Schlock for his aunt Catherine Schlect. It was designated a Chicago Landmark on January 20, 1999.

The Commission on Chicago Landmarks added a historical marker near this home in honor of four Schock-designed homes in the Austin neighborhood.
