= Seth Warner House =

Historic house in Illinois, United States

- U.S. National Register of Historic Places
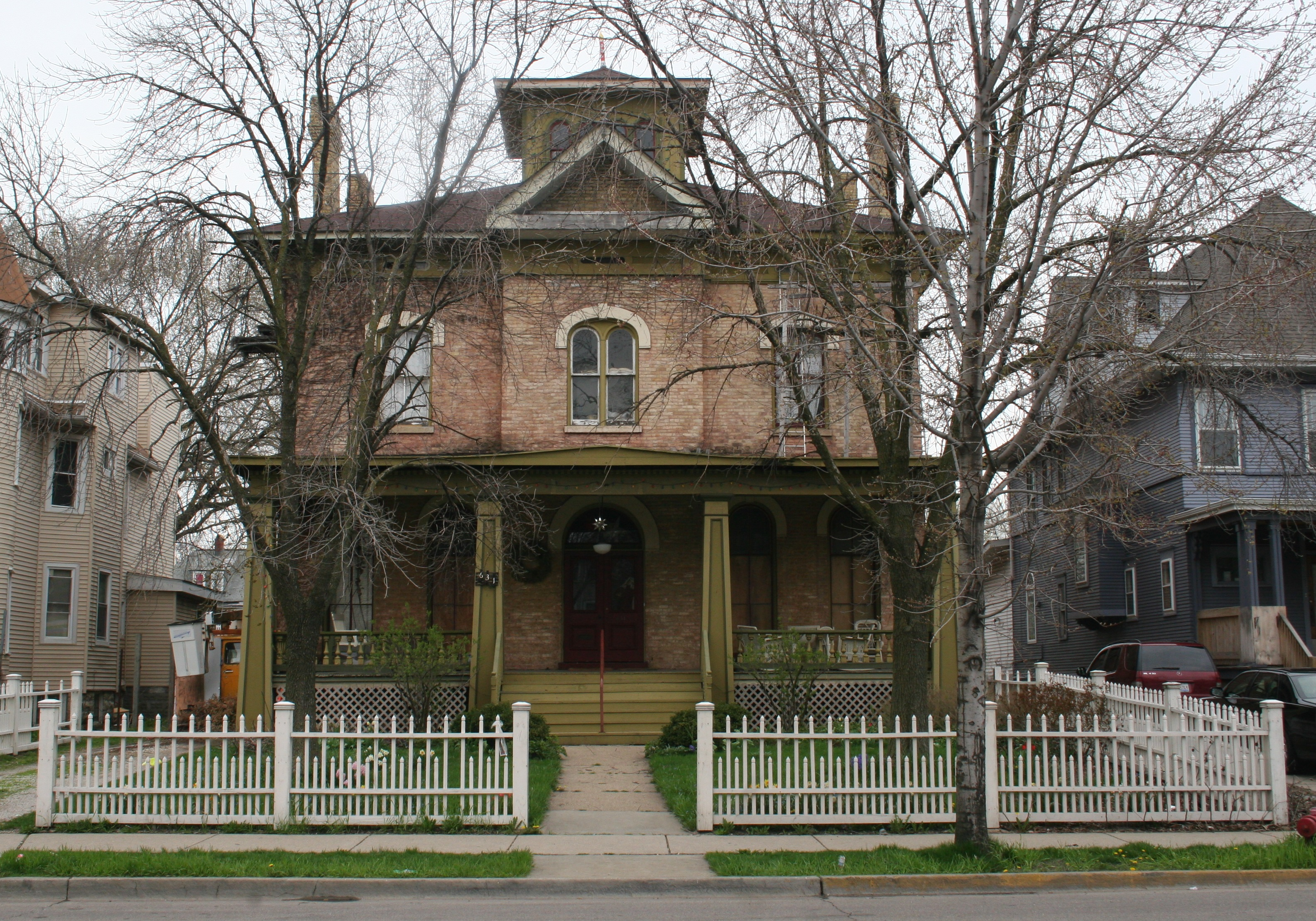

- Location within Chicago metropolitan area Location within Illinois Location within the United States
- Location: 631 N. Central Ave., Chicago, Illinois
- Coordinates: 41°53′31″N 87°45′54″W
- Area: less than one acre
- Built: 1869
- Architectural style: Tuscan Villa Italianate
- NRHP reference No.: 82002531
- Added to NRHP: June 3, 1982

The Seth Warner House is a historic house located at 631 N. Central Avenue in the Austin neighborhood of Chicago, Illinois. Built in 1869 by businessman Seth Warner, the house is the oldest remaining in Austin. The house was designed in the Tuscan Villa Italianate style and includes a verandah on the rear side, a bracketed cornice, and a cupola atop the roof. In 1924, George Haskell and his wife converted the house into the Austin Conservatory of Music, which later became the Austin College of Music. Violinist Paul Vernon merged his Austin Academy of Fine Arts with the College of Music in 1934, and the house served as a neighborhood arts center until 1979.

The house was added to the National Register of Historic Places on June 3, 1982. On February 23, 2022, the house was designated as a Chicago Landmark, with the added distinction, at that time, of being one of only 13 Chicago landmarks that predated the Chicago Fire of 1871. It suffered damage due to a fire on June 15, 2023.
