= Austin Town Hall Park =

Park and historic district in Chicago, Illinois

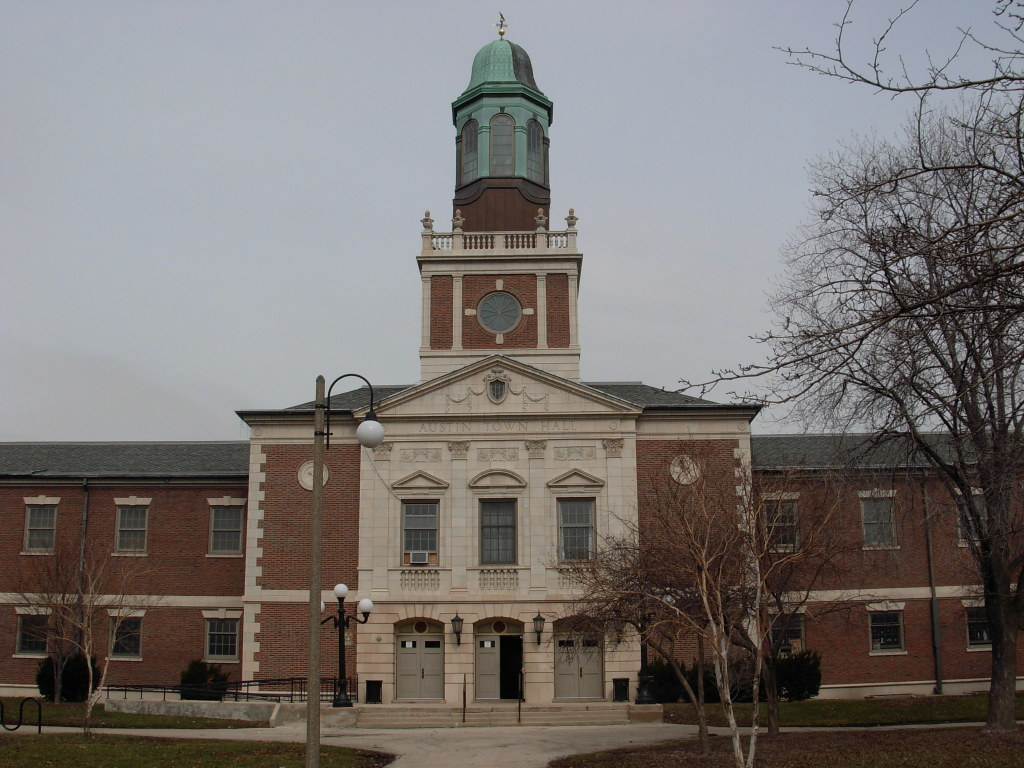
- Austin Town Hall Park fieldhouse
- Interactive map of Austin Town Hall Park
- Location: Roughly bounded by West Lake St., N. Central Ave., N. Parkside Ave., and West Race Ave., Chicago, Illinois
- Coordinates: 41.8886°N 87.7658°W
- Public transit: Green at Central
- Austin Town Hall Park Historic District
- U.S. National Register of Historic Places
- U.S. Historic district
- Area: 7.6 acres (3.1 ha)
- NRHP reference No.: 06001015
- Added to NRHP: November 15, 2006

Austin Town Hall Park is a park at 5610 W. Lake Street in the Austin neighborhood of Chicago, Illinois. The site was formerly used for the town hall of Cicero Township. The Austin subdivision of Cicero was annexed to the City of Chicago in 1899, and the town hall site eventually became part of the Chicago Park District. The park's fieldhouse, designed by Michaelsen and Rognstad in the 1920s, is influenced largely by Philadelphia's Independence Hall.

The Austin Town Hall Park Historic District was added to the National Register of Historic Places in 2006.
