= F. R. Schock House =

Coordinates: 41.8893°N 87.7702°W

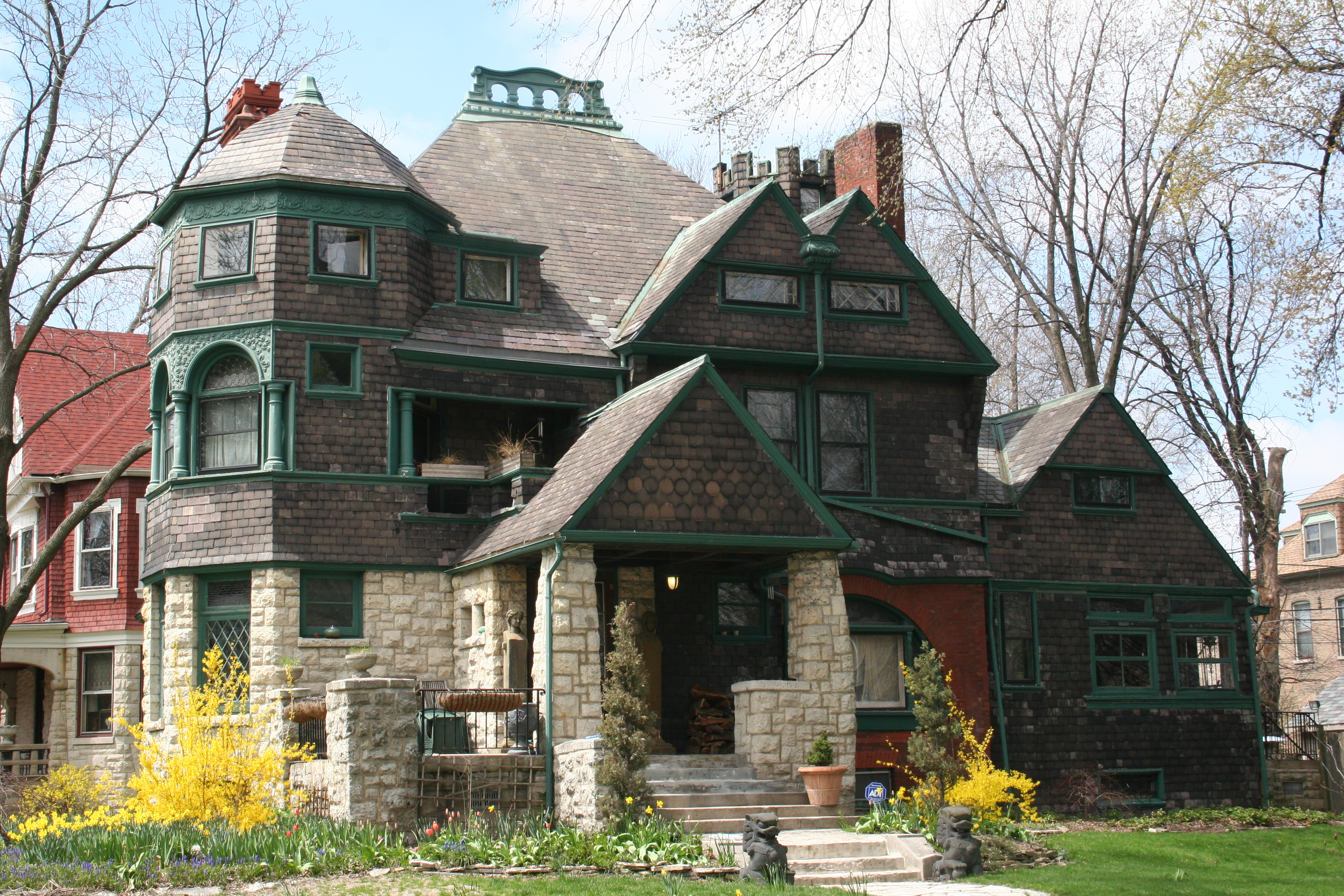
- F.R. Schock house in South Austin
- Interactive map of the F. R. Schock House area

General information
- Architectural style: Queen Anne style
- Location: 5804 West Midway Park, Chicago, Illinois

Design and construction
- Architect: Fredrick R. Schock

Chicago Landmark
- Designated: January 20, 1999

The F. R. Schock House is a Queen Anne style house at 5804 West Midway Park in Chicago, Illinois, United States. The house was built in 1886 by Fredrick R. Schock for himself. It was designated a Chicago Landmark on January 20, 1999.

The Commission on Chicago Landmarks added a historical marker about this home and three other Schock-designed homes in the Austin neighborhood a block north of this home.
