= Westside Health Authority =

- Established: 1988; 38 years ago
- Founder: Jacqueline Reed
- Type: 501(c)(3) non-profit organization
- Key people: Morris Reed, CEO
- Revenue: $9,470,101 (2024)
- Website: healthauthority.org

The Westside Health Authority (WHA) is an American community-based, non-profit organization located in Chicago's Austin neighborhood. Historically, it has served a primarily African American community. Currently the organization serves about 22,000 residents through programs related to employment, youth mentoring, and leadership, re-entry for individuals returning from prison, and economic growth.The organization has six locations.

== Background ==
The closure of St. Anne's Hospital in 1988, and the resulting reduction in access to affordable health care, prompted action from Jacqueline Reed, a student at the University of Chicago's Crown Family School of Social Work, Policy, and Practice. In response to the healthcare crisis, Reed organized public forums and faith-based fundraising to secure a building and organize medical services. This led to the creation of the Westside Health Authority (WHA) in 1988.

Reed stated that her upbringing in Mississippi influenced her approach to community organizing. Community fundraising contributed to the $7.4 million construction of the Austin Wellness Center, which opened in 2004.

== Expansion ==
Since the 1990s, under the leadership of CEO Morris Reed, the agency has expanded its operations to six locations. These locations offer programs focused on employment, housing, youth development, violence prevention, and re-entry support for formerly incarcerated individuals.

An initiative launched in 2016, called the Good Neighbour Campaign, secured a grant worth $1 million. The campaign focuses on existing talents and strengths of residents to address issues such as safety, youth engagement, and health issues. The campaign has mobilized more than 600 residents across 31 blocks and helped establish block clubs. It has also organized youth sports leagues, art projects, and cultural events. Volunteers are trained to intervene in violent situations and to provide peer support and resource coordination.

In 2011, WHA secured over $2 million as part of a community-benefits agreement with US Bank.

== Core programs and services ==
=== Youth development ===
WHA's Youth Innovation Center offers programs including mentorship, workforce development, and technology-related activities. The initiatives for youth development include career pipeline programs, apprenticeships, substance use counseling, and civic leadership projects.

=== Community re-entry ===
The Community Re-entry Center works to assist the formerly incarcerated, veterans, and others who are reintegrating into society. The center provides job readiness training, vocational skills development, and transitional employment opportunities.

=== Economic development ===
WHA has contributed to the development of the West Side through projects such as the Austin Wellness Center and Clinic, and the 2025 Chicago Prize finalist, $10 million Aspire Center. These projects aim to create sustainable economic opportunities, provide educational opportunities, and improve public safety for all residents of all ages.

=== Aspire Center redevelopment ===
In January 2022, the Chicago City Council unanimously approved zoning changes allowing the Westside Health Authority to redevelop the former Emmet Elementary School at 5500–5536 W. Madison Street into a workforce training and community hub known as the Aspire Center for Workplace Innovation.

Emmet Elementary School closed in 2013 as part of a Chicago Public Schools district-wide closure of 49 schools, most of which were located on the city’s South and West sides. WHA purchased the property in 2018. Because the site had been rezoned for residential use after the school’s closure, City Council approval was required to permit business and social service uses.

The Aspire Center forms part of the broader Aspire Initiative, which also includes planned affordable housing and a health and fitness center at other sites in the Austin neighborhood. The center was planned to house workforce training programs, social services, and leased space for partner organizations, with workforce training expected to be led by the Jane Addams Resource Corporation.

As of 2022, project costs for the Aspire Center redevelopment were reported at approximately $28 million, with a large portion of the costs being paid by a $10 million grant from the Illinois state capital budget. Additional funding was expected from private donors and public sources, with workforce development programming anticipated to begin prior to full project completion.

=== Community Wellness center ===
The Community Wellness program is a community-based center in which they aim to promote health, safety, and resilience across neighborhoods through integrated services and proactive engagement. Services include primary care, behavioral health services, street outreach, and grassroots mobilizations.
