= Austin Historic District (Chicago) =

- U.S. National Register of Historic Places
- U.S. Historic district
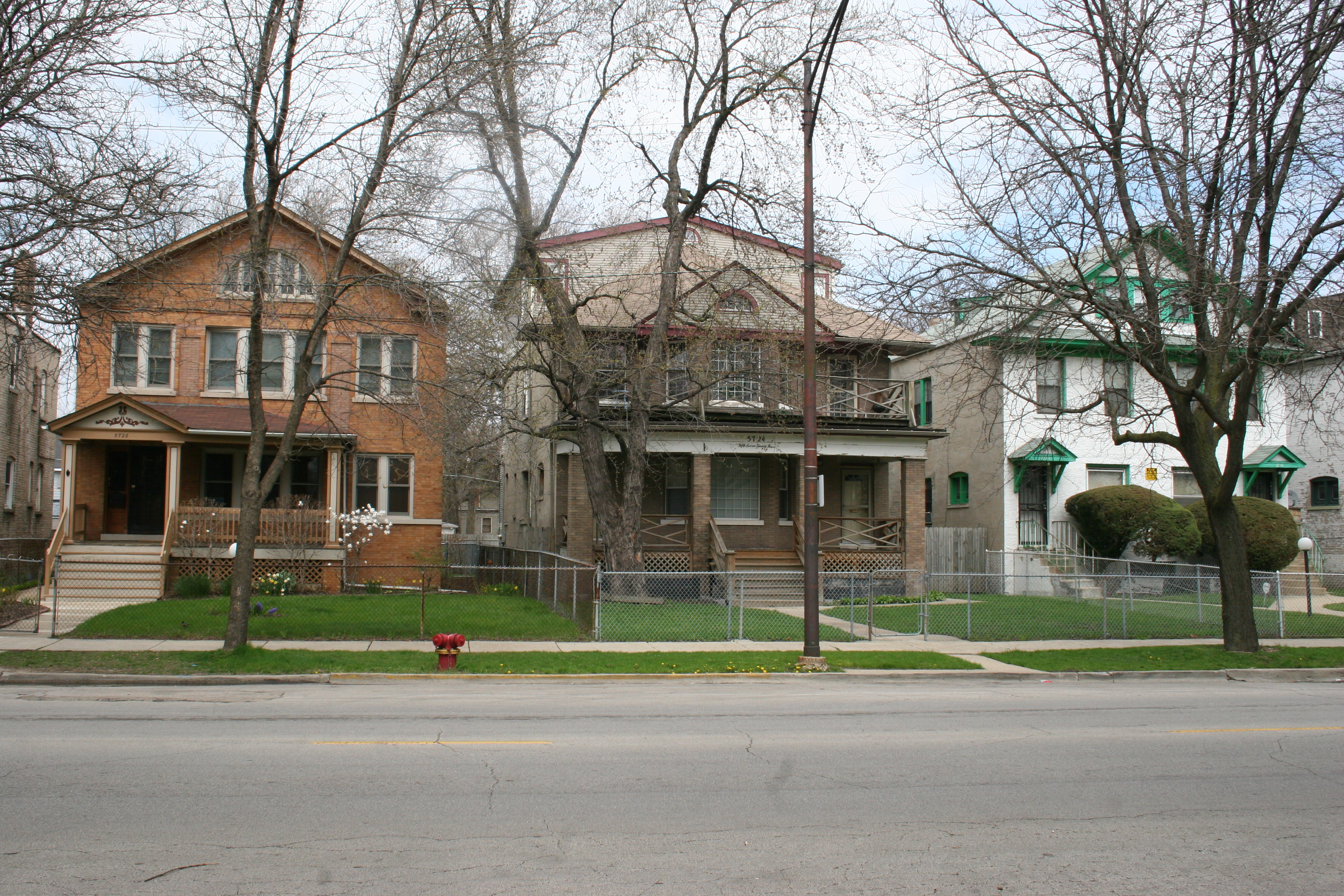
- Houses along the 5700 block of West Lake Street

- Location within Chicago metropolitan area Location within Illinois Location within the United States
- Location: Roughly bounded by W. Ohio St., N. Waller, Parkside, W. West End & N. Mayfield Aves. & W. Corcoran Pl., Chicago, Illinois
- Coordinates: 41°53′12″N 87°46′12″W
- Area: 95 acres (38 ha)
- NRHP reference No.: 85001741
- Added to NRHP: August 8, 1985

The Austin Historic District is a residential historic district in central Austin, Chicago, Illinois. The district, which includes 336 buildings, has a large number of Victorian homes, with many examples of the Queen Anne, Stick, and Shingle styles. Henry Austin, for whom Austin is named, began development in the district in the late 1860s. While the Panic of 1873 halted the area's early development, a construction boom in the 1880s spurred its growth; most of the homes in the district were built in the 1880s and 1890s. By the time Chicago annexed it in 1899, Austin had become one of the city's more significant middle-class suburbs. Future development in the neighborhood, including the construction of multi-family housing, changed its character, leaving the district to represent Austin's original plans.
