= Lewis Center =

Coordinates: 41.8781°N 87.6265°W

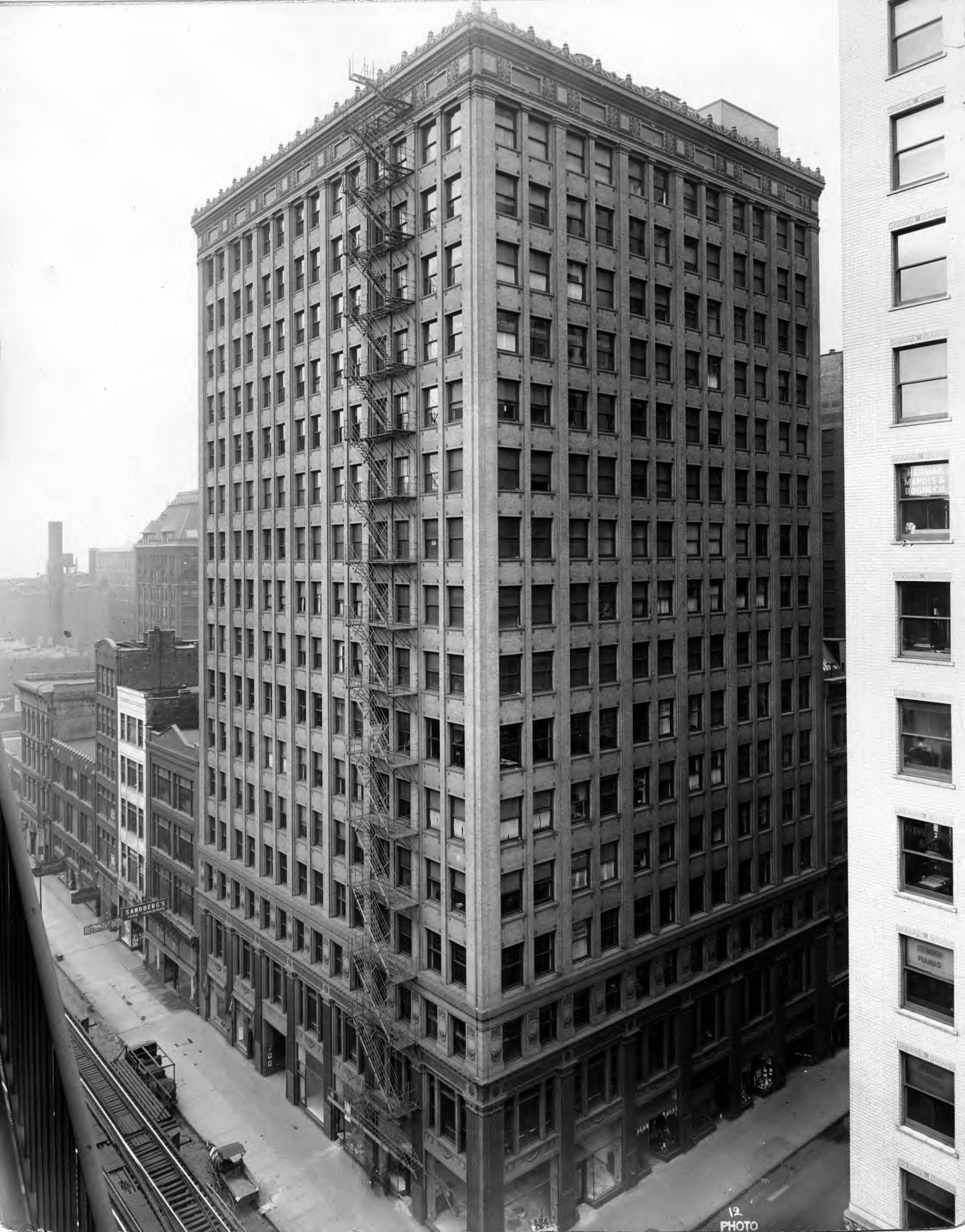
c. 1915

The Lewis Center, also known as the Frank J. Lewis Center, is a building located at 25 E. Jackson Blvd. in Chicago, Illinois. It is currently the main building of the DePaul University College of Law. Built in 1916, it was designed by the Chicago architectural firm of Graham, Burnham & Co. It was originally known as the Kimball Building and was the home of the W. W. Kimball Company, a manufacturer of pianos. The building included Kimball Hall, a five hundred seat recital hall, which was an important music venue in Chicago from the time the building opened into the 1950s. In 1955 the building was purchased by DePaul University through a gift by Frank J. Lewis. An earlier building, also known as Kimball Hall, stood on the same site from 1891-1916.
