= Austin, Chicago =

Community area in Chicago, Illinois

Austin
- Community area
- Community Area 25 – Austin
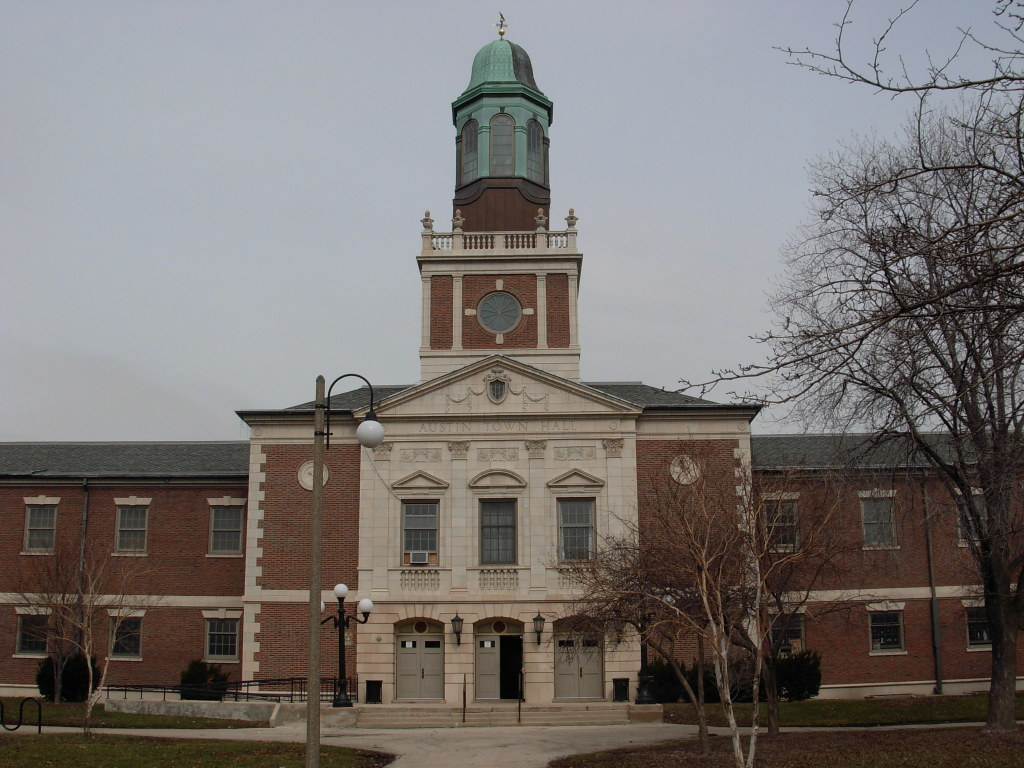
- The Austin Town Hall Park field house.

- Location within the city of Chicago
- Coordinates: 41°54′N 87°45.6′W
- Country: United States
- State: Illinois
- County: Cook
- City: Chicago
- Named for: Henry W. Austin Sr.
- Neighborhoods: List: Galewood; The Island; North Austin; South Austin

Area
  - Total: 7.16 sq mi (18.54 km^{2})

Population (2024)
  - Total: 97,452
  - Density: 13,610/sq mi (5,256/km^{2})

Demographics (2024)
  - White: 5.6%
  - Black: 69.0%
  - Hispanic: 21.8%
  - Asian: 0.9%
  - Other: 2.8%

Educational Attainment 2024
  - High School Diploma or Higher: 82.9%
  - Bachelor's Degree or Higher: 16.4%
- Time zone: UTC-6 (CST)
  - Summer (DST): UTC-5 (CDT)
- ZIP Codes: 60644 (entire); 60639, 60651, 60707 (partial)
- Median household income (2022): $44,883

Austin is one of the 77 officially-designated community areas of Chicago in Illinois, United States. Located on the city's West Side, it is the third-largest community area by population (behind the Near North Side and Lake View) and the second-largest geographically (behind South Deering). Austin's eastern boundary is the Belt Railway located just east of Cicero Avenue. Its northernmost border is the Milwaukee District West Line. Its southernmost border is at Roosevelt Road from the Belt Railway west to Austin Boulevard. The northernmost portion, north of North Avenue, extends west to Harlem Avenue, abutting Elmwood Park. In addition to Elmwood Park, Austin also borders the suburbs of Cicero and Oak Park.

== History ==
=== Early development ===
In 1835, Henry DeKoven purchased prairie land in the region. In 1857, a group of citizens formed the Town of Cicero, a ten-member local governing body that covered modern-day Cicero, Oak Park, Berwyn, and Austin. Eight years later, DeKoven's land was bought by Henry W. Austin. Austin, a businessman and real estate speculator, developed the namesake Austinville subdivision. Its population grew exponentially as the area's attractive amenities and access to suburban railroad service drew in population. In 1870, the Town of Cicero placed its town hall in Austin. However, by the 1890s, the heavily populated Austin area dominated town politics, but did not constitute a majority of voters. The Austin-controlled township government allowed the Lake Street Elevated to extend into Oak Park. Outraged, the other residents of Cicero Township voted to allow Chicago to annex the Austin area in an 1899 referendum. The residents of Austin voted against the referendum.

=== Neighborhood growth ===
After its annexation, Austin continued to maintain an independent, suburban identity. By the 1920s, the area had developed significant street railways to serve its commuter population. This infrastructure attracted a large group of European immigrants to the community. In 1926, the area had an estimated 140,000 residents. In 1923, Austin Hospital opened. In 1938, the hospital, now called William Temperance Hospital, was taken over by Sisters of Saint Casimir, who operated the hospital as Loretto Hospital.

In 1949, construction began on the Eisenhower Expressway, which bisected the southern portion of Austin.

=== African-American migration, white flight, and economic decline ===
After World War II, African Americans increasingly moved into the surrounding community areas of East Garfield Park, North Lawndale, and West Garfield Park. After the arrival of African Americans during the Great Migration, race-related prejudices such as a case of the White flight movement, with a dramatic decrease in White residents, White-owned businesses, equal city services support and resources, racially motivated realtor practices, and industrial jobs. By 1970, the Austin community was 32% Black. A decade later, it was 73% Black. These trends of a decline in city services and resources and jobs would continue for the rest of the 20th century with Austin.

The Austin community gained a reputation for violence after the loss of free-flowing capital during white flight when prostitution, drug dealing, gang activity, and shoot-outs became commonplace in the Austin neighborhood. Many trace the problems that impacted this community to the crack cocaine epidemic, as well as the opioid crisis, mass incarceration, and the HIV epidemic, which resulted in further economic decline and the loss of many social safety nets. This led to many middle- and upper middle-class African Americans leaving for the suburbs. In 1992, the 15th District (Austin) of the Chicago Police Department located at 5327 West Chicago Avenue at the time recorded about 48 homicides, which covers most of the Austin neighborhood, making the Austin District the fourth-deadliest police district at the time, before the 11th District (Harrison), which had 93 homicides, 7th District (Englewood), which had 80 homicides, and the 2nd District (Wentworth), which had 69 homicides.

The latter half of the 20th century saw significant divestment from the community. The Central station of the Chicago Transit Authority's Congress Line was closed on September 2, 1973. In 1988, Westside Health Authority was formed after the closure of St. Anne's Hospital. In 1991, the Sisters of Saint Casimir gave control of Loretto Hospital to a management company.

In 1999, developers agreed to turn the abandoned Galewood railyard into an industrial park. During the development of the property, then-Alderman Ike Carothers solicited a bribe to allow the permitting process and zoning changes to move forward. The subsequent trials created a political scandal, and ended with the conviction of the developer and Carothers on various felony charges. The $60 million development ultimately brought new homes and a movie theater to the neighborhood.

== Neighborhoods ==
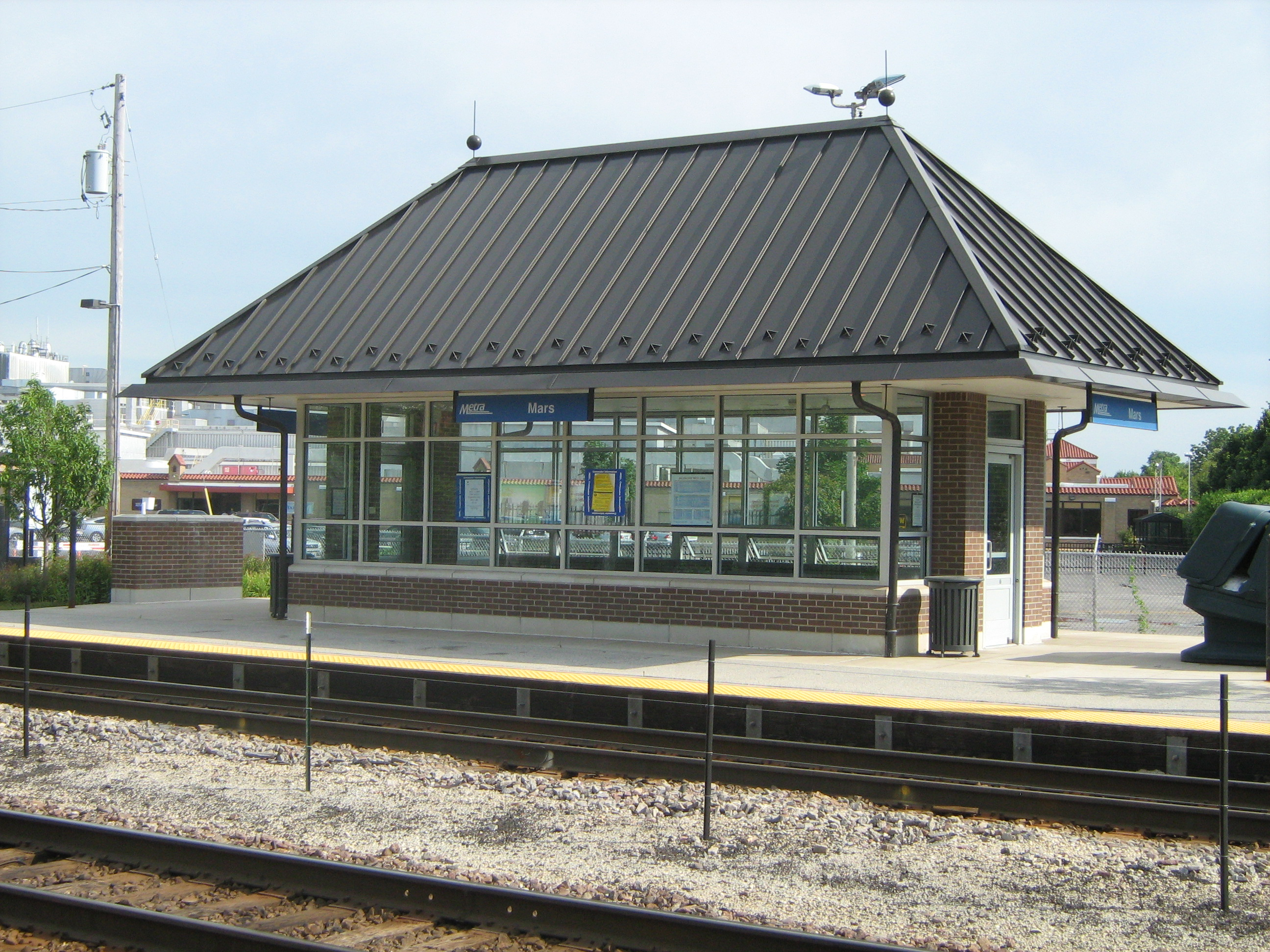
Mars station in Galewood

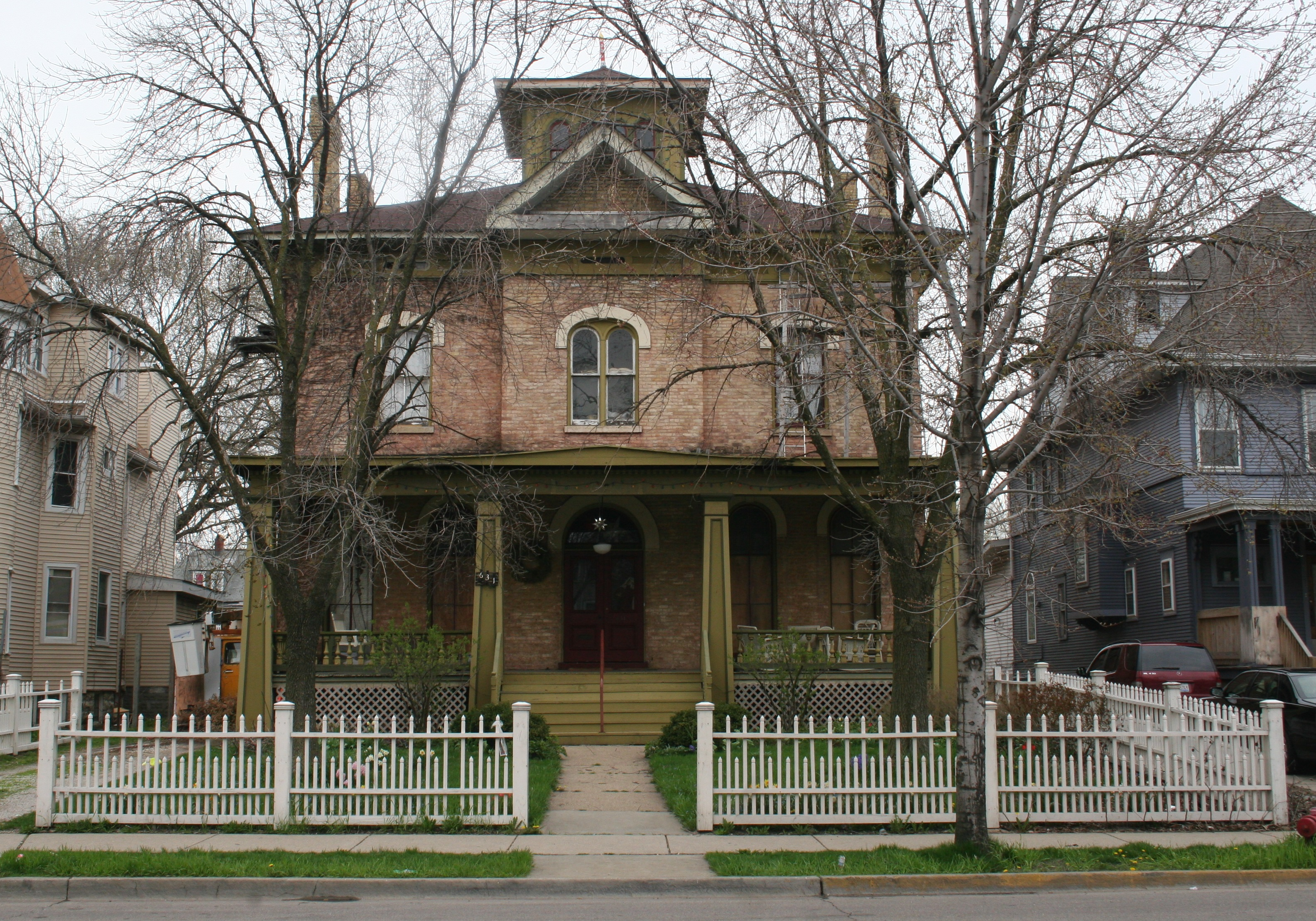
Seth Warner House

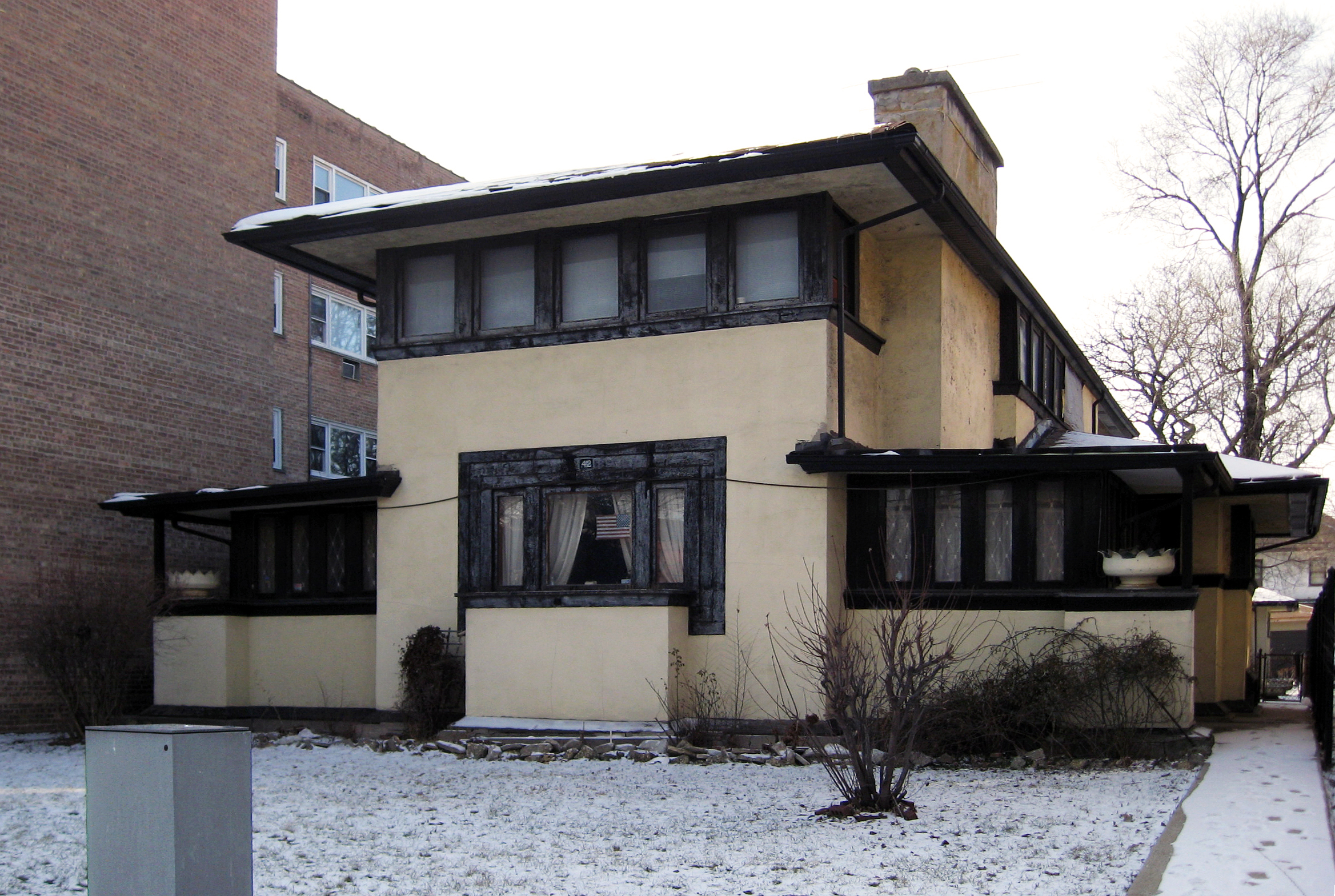
Residence of J.J. Walser Jr.

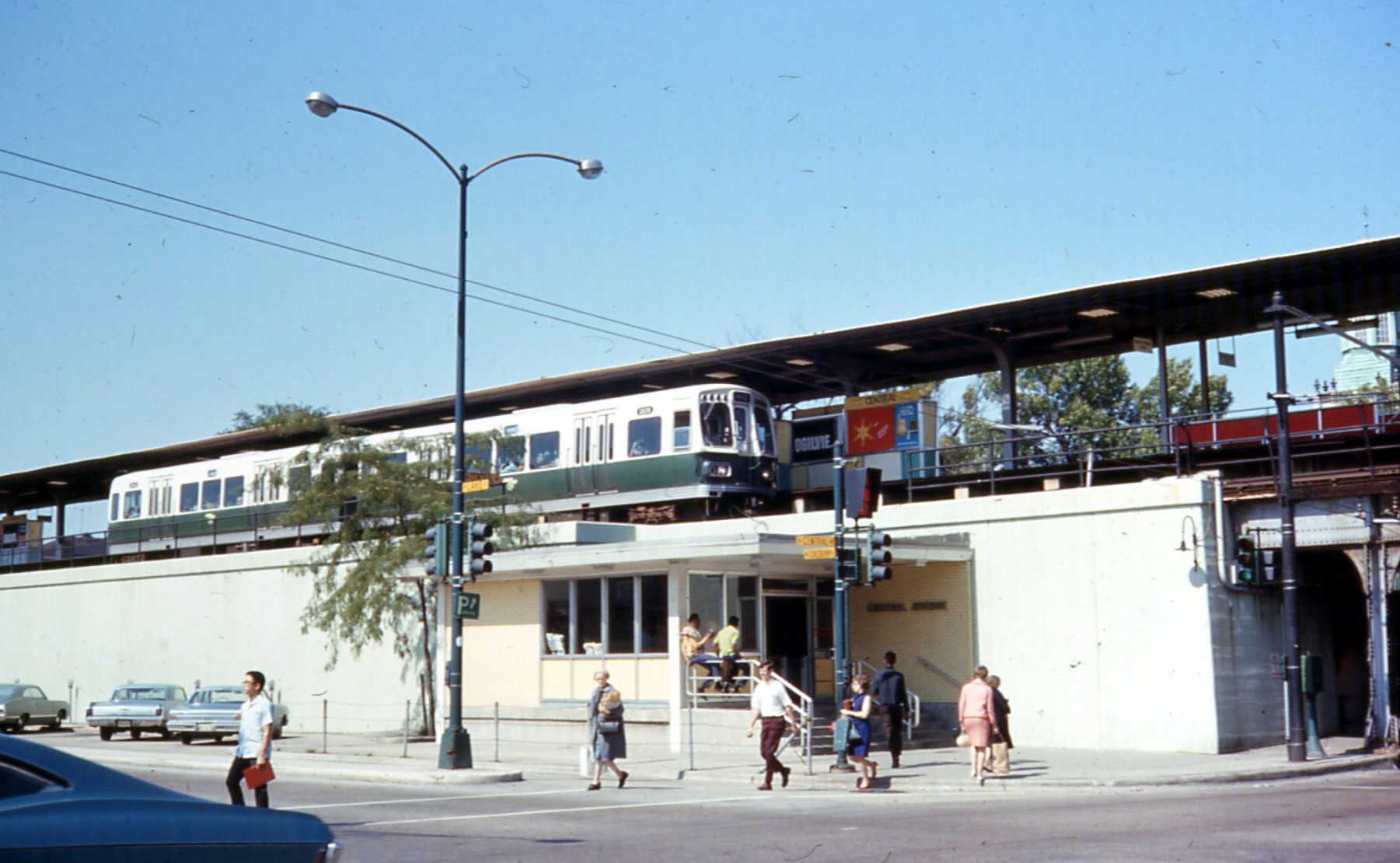
Central Station

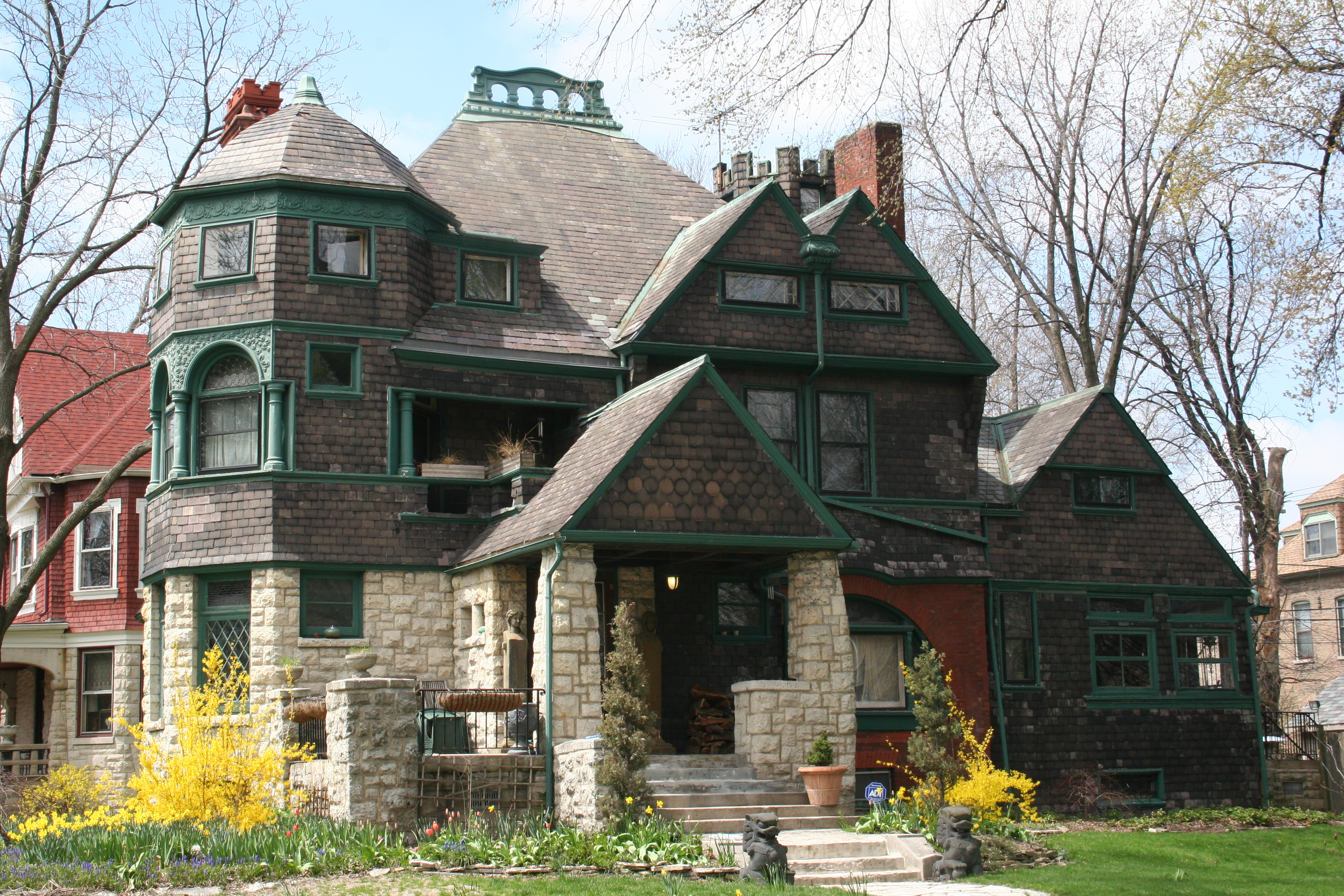
F. R. Schock House

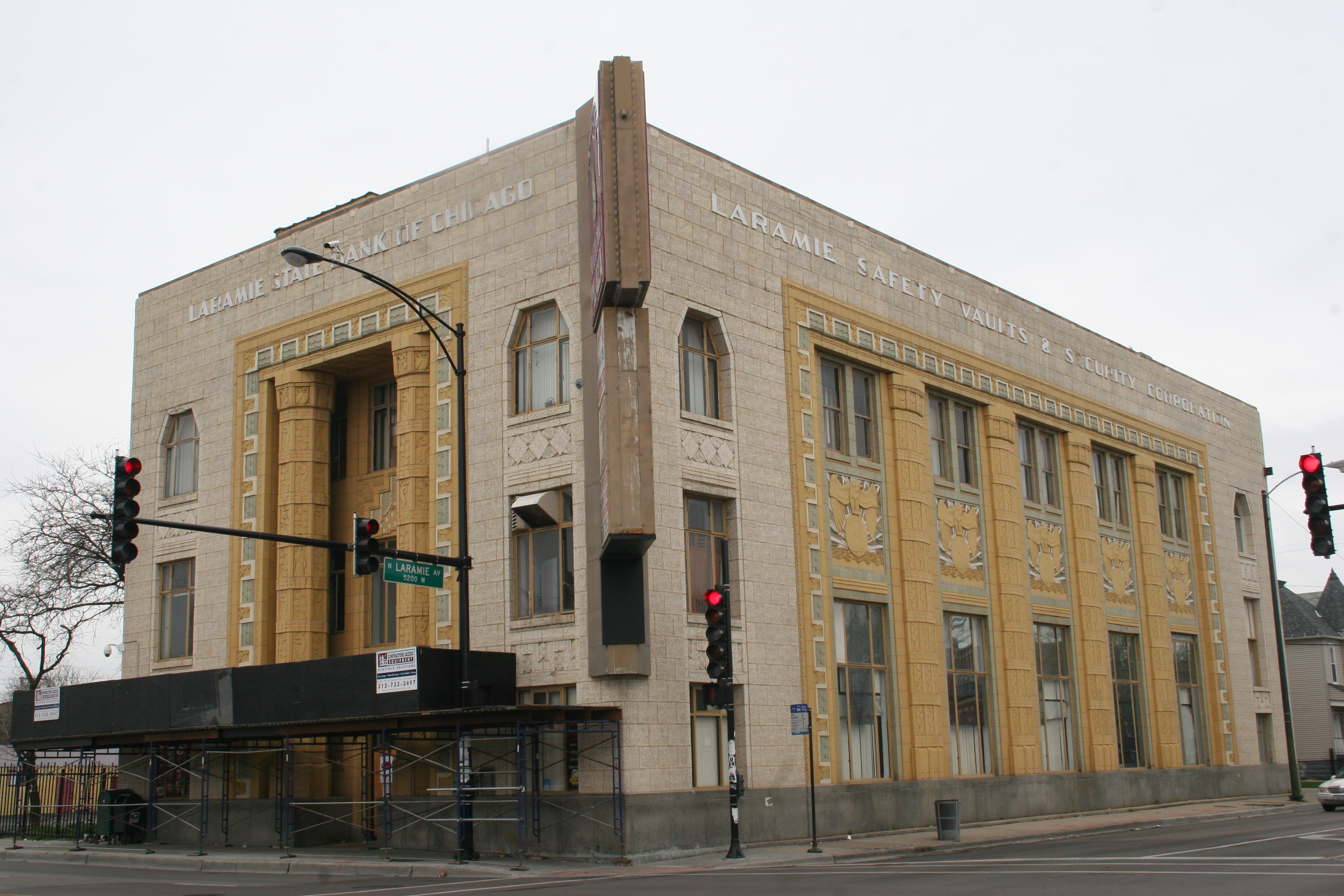
Laramie State Bank Building

Austin is Chicago's second-largest community area both by population and by land area. The Austin community area is made up of four neighborhoods: Galewood, The Island, North Austin, and South Austin.

=== Galewood ===
Galewood is named for Abram Gale, who bought a farm on the area in 1838. The neighborhood is bordered by the Milwaukee District West Line to the north, Harlem Avenue to the west, North Avenue to the south, and Narragansett Avenue to the east. The area is a historically Italian-American community with a sizable population of Chicago city employees. Since the 1980s, it has seen an increase in African-American and Latino residents, but this integration has occurred peacefully in contrast with other areas of Chicago.

Galewood has two stations on the Milwaukee District West Line. The first, Mars station functions as a stop for employees of the nearby Mars, Incorporated factory, which closed in 2024, and Shriners Hospitals for Children, the latter of which is located in Montclare. The Mars station only stops during traditional commuting hours. The second, Galewood station is located east of Mars station and is a regular service station. Canadian Pacific (which operates in the U.S. Midwest as the Soo Line Railroad) operates freight trains on the line via trackage rights.

The neighborhood has strong ties with neighboring Montclare, including sharing a namesake library in the Chicago Public Library system, and is sometimes considered as part of that neighborhood and not the Austin community.

Galewood is significantly whiter than the remainder of Austin. Galewood is 32.86% White, 28.80% African American, 33.0% Hispanic or Latino, 2.32% Asian, and 3.01% from two or more races. (Note: Census Tracts 2505 in Cook, IL and Galewood (as defined by Google Maps) are coterminous.)

=== The Island ===
The Island neighborhood is located in the southwest corner of the Austin community. It has a population around 1,700 residents. It encompasses roughly a square mile and its western and southern borders are to the suburbs of Oak Park and Cicero, respectively. It is further isolated from the rest of Austin by an industrial corridor to its east and railroad tracks and Interstate 290 to the north. It is only accessible from Austin Boulevard and Roosevelt Road.

The Island was the last of Austin's neighborhoods to integrate. In the 1980s, when the rest of Austin was over 70% African American, The Island did not have a single African-American family. In 1984, when an African-American family attempted to move in on Roosevelt Road, they were met with violent resistance and shortly moved out. Politically, the area went heavily for Jane Byrne in the Democratic primary and for Edward Vrdolyak against Harold Washington in the 1987 mayoral election that broke down on racial lines. Today, The Island is an integrated community.

The area, once industrial, has a diverse economy. Chicago Studio City, the largest film studio in the Midwestern United States, is located here. The films Transformers: Dark of the Moon, The Dark Knight, and Public Enemies were partially filmed in The Island, as were episodes of Empire and Shameless.

=== North Austin ===
One of Austin's neighborhoods is North Austin; its boundaries start north at Milwaukee District West Line and Armitage Avenue, western boundaries are Austin Avenue or Austin Boulevard south of North Avenue, eastern boundaries to Cicero Avenue, and southern boundaries to Division Street. The Robert LeFlore Jr. Post Office at 5001 West Division Street is in this neighborhood.

=== South Austin ===
South Austin is the area's largest neighborhood. It is bordered by Division Street to the north, Austin Boulevard to the west, Roosevelt Road to the south, and Cicero Avenue to the east. During the Austin area's transition from a predominantly white community to a predominantly African-American community, the South Austin neighborhood was the first neighborhood to become African-American majority. The neighborhood is characterized by its numerous historic buildings. The neighborhood is home to six landmarks on the National Register of Historic Places: Austin Historic District, Midway Park, Austin Town Hall Park Historic District, Columbus Park, First Congregational Church of Austin, Joseph J. Walser House, and the Seth Warner House. Austin Town Hall Park, modeled after Philadelphia's Independence Hall, is also in this neighborhood.

It is also home to an additional seven Chicago landmarks not listed on the National Register of Historic Places: Beeson House and Coach House, Hitchcock House, Laramie State Bank Building, Schlect House, F. R. Schock House, Marie Schock House, and the Third Unitarian Church.

== Demographics ==
Historical population
Census	Pop.	Note	%±
1930	131,114		—
1940	132,107		0.8%
1950	132,180		0.1%
1960	125,133		−5.3%
1970	128,084		2.4%
1980	138,026		7.8%
1990	114,079		−17.3%
2000	117,527		3.0%
2010	98,514		−16.2%
2020	96,557		−2.0%

According to a 2016 analysis by the Chicago Metropolitan Agency for Planning, 99,711 people and 32,277 households were residing in the area.

The racial makeup of the area was 4.2% White, 84.2% African American, 0.5% Asian, and 0.80% from other races. Hispanics or Latinos of any race were 10.3% of the population.

In the area, the age distribution was 30.5% under 19, 20.8% from 20 to 34, 18.7% from 35 to 49, 18.4% from 50 to 64, and 11.60% who were 65 or older. The median age was 33.9 years.

The median household income for the area was $31,435 as opposed to $47,831 for the city. The area's residents were disproportionately lower income; 41.0% of residents earned less than $25,000, 27.6% of residents earned between $25,000 and $49,999, 14.1% earned between $50,000 and $74,999, 8.0% earned between $75,000 and $99,999, 6.4% earned between $100,000 and $149,999, and 2.9% earned $150,000 or more.

About 41,807 residents were in the labor force; 18.9% of workers were employed in the healthcare industry, 11.3% were employed in retail, 11% were employed in administration, 8.4% worked in education, and 8.3% worked in hospitality and food services. The area had an unemployment rate of 22.1%.

== Crime ==
In 2025, according to the Chicago Police Department, Austin had 4,685 crimes total and .0481 crimes per capita, which put it 30th place out of 77 community areas in the city. This represented a 12 percent decrease from 2024.

== Economy ==
As of 2023, a general lack exists for food-oriented retail in Austin, and many people living in Austin go to suburban communities to the west to buy groceries. The Austin Town Hall City Market is held to stave off the food desert complex.

== Education ==
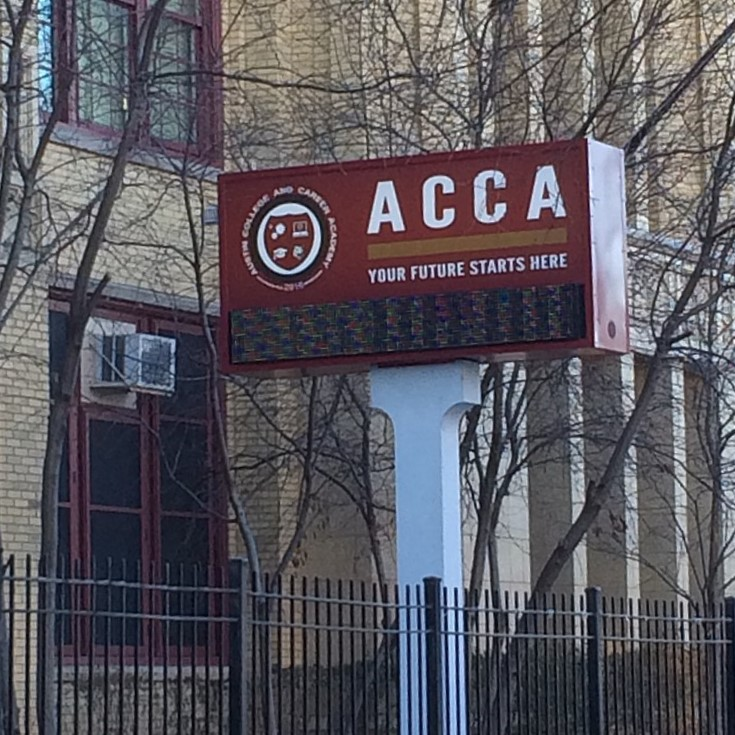
Austin Community Academy High School

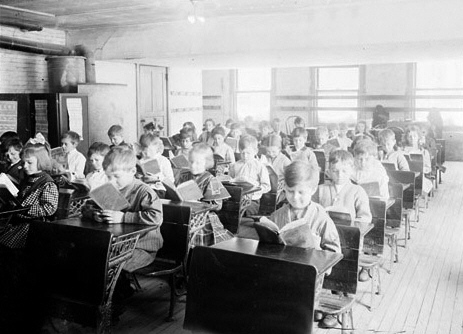
Children reading at the "Robert Emmet School" in 1911: The school, located at 5500 W Madison Street, closed in 2013.

Austin Community Academy High School closed after spring 2007. New smaller schools have replaced Austin Community Academy High School: Austin Business and Entrepreneurship Academy, which opened in 2006, and Austin Polytechnical Academy, which opened in September 2007.

Other portions of the community area are zoned to Manley High School, Marshall High School, and Orr Campus. Michele Clark Magnet High School is in Austin.

K-8 schools:

- George Rogers Clark Elementary School – It is a part of the "Island" Community. In 2022 there was a proposal to have CPS acquire an abandoned parking lot to add play space for Clark ES.
- DePriest Elementary School
- John Hay Elementary School
- Howe Elementary School
- Leland Elementary School
- Leslie Lewis Elementary School
- Joseph Lovett Elementary School
- Nash Elementary School
- Ronald E. McNair Elementary School
- Harriet E. Sayre Elementary School
- Spencer Elementary School
- Ella Flagg Young Elementary School

Former public schools:

- Robert Emmet Elementary School – Closed in 2013. The West Side Health Authority acquired the building in 2018. The author planned to make a community service center for a cost of $120,000,000. This was because the Austin community was not interested in the former Emmet School being a medical facility.

The Roman Catholic Archdiocese of Chicago formerly operated:

- Our Lady Help of Christians School. (closed 1998)
- St. Peter Canisius School (closed 1990)
- San Miguel School Gary Comer Campus – Opened in 2002, closed in 2012.

Chicago Public Library:

- Austin Branch – Opened in 1929, named after Henry W. Austin, with Alfred S. Alschuler as the architect. From 1979 to 1981, the library was renovated.
- North Austin Branch – Its opening was August 5, 1995.
- West Chicago Avenue Branch – Its opening was June 2, 2006.

== Media ==
Austin is served by three free weekly newspapers. The West Suburban Journal, founded in 2004, published by black-owned press Trottie Publishing Group, based in the West Cook County suburb of Westchester. L. Nicole Trottie, founder and publisher of West Suburban Journal, is the first black woman in Illinois' 190-year history to found an accredited weekly newspaper. Trottie is also the first African-American woman ever elected to serve on the Illinois Press Association's executive board of directors in its 150-year newspaper-rich history. The Austin Voice has been published in Austin since 1988. The Austin Weekly News, founded in 2005, is published by The Wednesday Journal, a publisher of free weekly newspapers based in Oak Park, Illinois. Both papers are published on Wednesdays and distributed in stores, office buildings, and recreational venues throughout the community. Austin is also served by Austin Talks, an online publication maintained by journalism students at Chicago's Columbia College and underwritten in part by the Chicago Community Trust.

== Healthcare ==
St. Anne's Hospital, located in the Austin community area, had a capacity for 437 patients. Its property had seven buildings on 9.2 acres (3.7 ha) of land. In August 1988 the Chicago Tribune reported that it was "expected" to end operations. In September of that year, it closed. In 1997, it was announced to become apartments for elderly people who are financially disadvantaged.

The Westside Health Authority serves residents for community health, job services, counseling and outreach. The WHA funded the construction of the Austin Wellness Center, which provides affordable health care for the community.

== Politics ==
Austin is a stronghold for the Democratic Party. In the 2016 presidential election, Austin cast 37,492 votes for Hillary Clinton and 1,280 votes for Donald Trump. Despite this landslide victory, it was Clinton's 23rd-largest margin of victory by percentage points in the 76 community areas she won. In the 2012 presidential election, Austin cast 44,734 votes for Barack Obama and 965 votes for Mitt Romney. It was Obama's 24th-largest margin of victory by percentage points in the 76 community areas he won.

At the local level, Austin is located in Chicago's 28th, 29th, and 37th wards represented by Democrats Jason Ervin, Chris Taliaferro, and Emma Mitts, respectively.

== Notable residents ==
- William J.P. Banks, longtime Alderman from Chicago's 36th ward. He resided in Galewood while on the Chicago City Council.
- Danny Boy, hip-hop artist with Death Row Records
- Da Brat, rapper and actress
- Hannibal Buress, stand-up comedian, actor, and television writer
- Peter M. Callan (1894–1965), member of the Illinois House of Representatives from 1959–1965. During his time in the legislature, he resided at 5567 West Gladys Avenue.
- Ralph Capone, member of the Chicago Outfit and brother of Al Capone, lived in The Island before moving to Wisconsin.
- Ike Carothers, Alderman from Chicago's 29th ward from 1999 until his resignation in 2010, lives in South Austin.
- Crucial Conflict, a Chicago-based hip-hop group, famous for their 1996 single "Hay", started at North Long Avenue and West Bloomingdale Avenue.
- Danny K. Davis, member of the United States House of Representatives from Illinois' 7th congressional district since 1999, resides in South Austin.
- Sam DeStefano (1909−1973), member of the Chicago Outfit, resided on the 1600 block of Sayre in Galewood.
- La Shawn K. Ford, member of the Illinois House of Representatives, resides in Austin.
- Bud Freeman and the Austin High School Gang
- Sam Giancana (1908–1975), member of the Chicago Outfit, lived in The Island before moving to the suburbs.
- Deborah Graham was a member of the Chicago City Council from the 29th ward from 2010 to 2015.
- Andrew Greeley (1928–2013), a Roman Catholic priest, sociologist, journalist, and popular novelist, was a childhood resident of the Austin community area.
- John Marshall Hamilton (1847–1905), 18th governor of Illinois (1883–1885), resided at 4720 West Madison Avenue at the time of his death.
- Edward Hanrahan (1921–2009), Cook County state's attorney from 1968 to 1972, was infamous for his role in the murder of Fred Hampton. He resided in Galewood during his political career.
- Steve Harris, actor (Diary of a Mad Black Woman, The Practice). He attended Resurrection Elementary School in Austin.
- Wood Harris, actor (The Wire, Remember the Titans, Creed), attended Resurrection Elementary School in Austin.
- Hugh Hefner, founder and longtime editor-in-chief of Playboy, was raised in the Galewood neighborhood and attended Sayre Elementary School.
- Brandon Johnson (born 1976), is the current mayor of Chicago.
- Roberta Karmel (born 1937) was the first female commissioner of the U.S. Securities and Exchange Commission.
- Camille Y. Lilly, member of the Illinois House of Representatives, lives in Galewood.
- Robert F. McPartlin (1926–1987) was a member of the Illinois House of Representatives from 1960 until his bribery indictment in 1976. During his time in the legislature, he resided at 5100 West Adams Street.
- Emma Mitts, Alderman from the 37th ward. She lives in South Austin.
- Thomas J. O'Brien, member of the United States House of Representatives from Illinois's 6th congressional district, resided in South Austin while in Congress.
- Pat Quinn, former Governor of Illinois. As of 2020, he lives in Galewood.
- John Rice (1968–2015), Alderman from the 36th ward from 2009 to 2011. He resided in Galewood while on the Chicago City Council.
- Philip J. Rock, President of the Illinois Senate from 1979 to 1993. He lived in the Midway Park neighborhood until he relocated to suburban Oak Park in 1977.
- Saba, rapper and record producer. He grew up in Austin.
- Nick Sposato, Alderman from Chicago's 36th ward from 2011 to 2015. He lived in Galewood until moving to the 38th ward after redistricting moved Galewood to the 29th ward.
- Jim Tobin (1945–2021), economist and founder of anti-tax advocacy group Taxpayers United of America.
- Robert Townsend
- Tom Tuohy
- Lois Weisberg, Commissioner of Cultural Affairs for the City of Chicago noted by Malcolm Gladwell in The Tipping Point for her expansive social network. She was born and raised in Austin.
- Erick Williams, chef
- Bobby Wilson, defensive tackle for the Washington Redskins of the National Football League. He attended high school in Austin.
- Frank Peter Witek (1921–1944), U.S. Marine and awardee of the Medal of Honor, resided at 1342 North Parkside Avenue.
- Violet Bidwill Wolfner (1900–1962), owner of the Chicago Cardinals of the National Football League, with her husband, Walter Wolfner, resided at 5825 West Washington Boulevard in 1951.
- Abe Woodson (1934–2014), American football cornerback and kick returner, played nine seasons in the National Football League, mainly with the San Francisco 49ers. He was raised and attended high school in Austin.
