= Marie Schock House =

Coordinates: 41.8898°N 87.7697°W

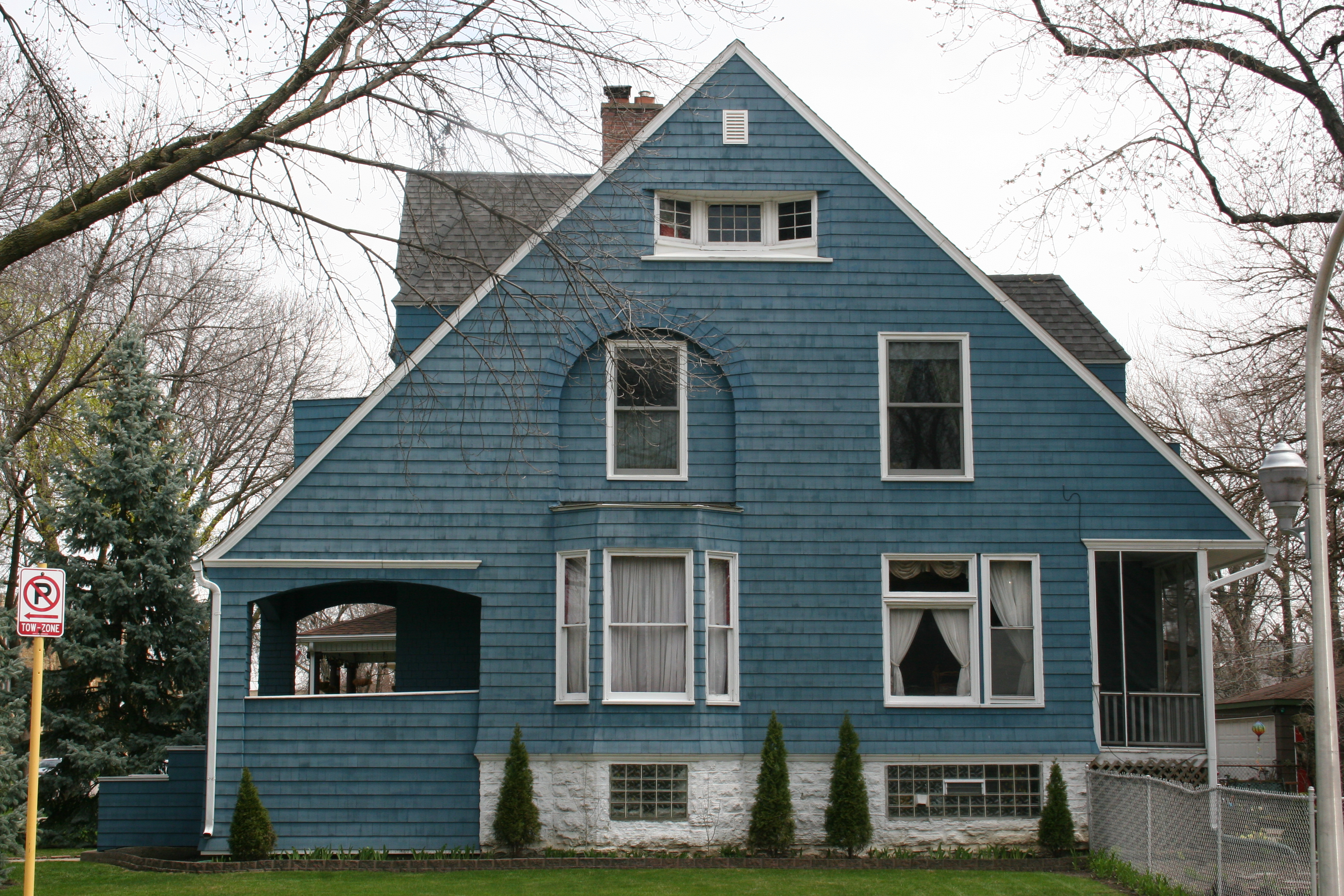
Marie Schock House in South Austin

The Marie Schock House is a Shingle Style house at 5749 West Race Avenue in Chicago, Illinois, United States. The house was built in 1888 by Fredrick R. Schock for his mother Marie Schock. It was designated a Chicago Landmark on January 20, 1999.

The Commission on Chicago Landmarks added a historical marker nearby in honor of this house and three other Schock-designed homes in the Austin neighborhood.
