= Laramie State Bank Building =

Former bank and Chicago landmark built in the Art Deco style

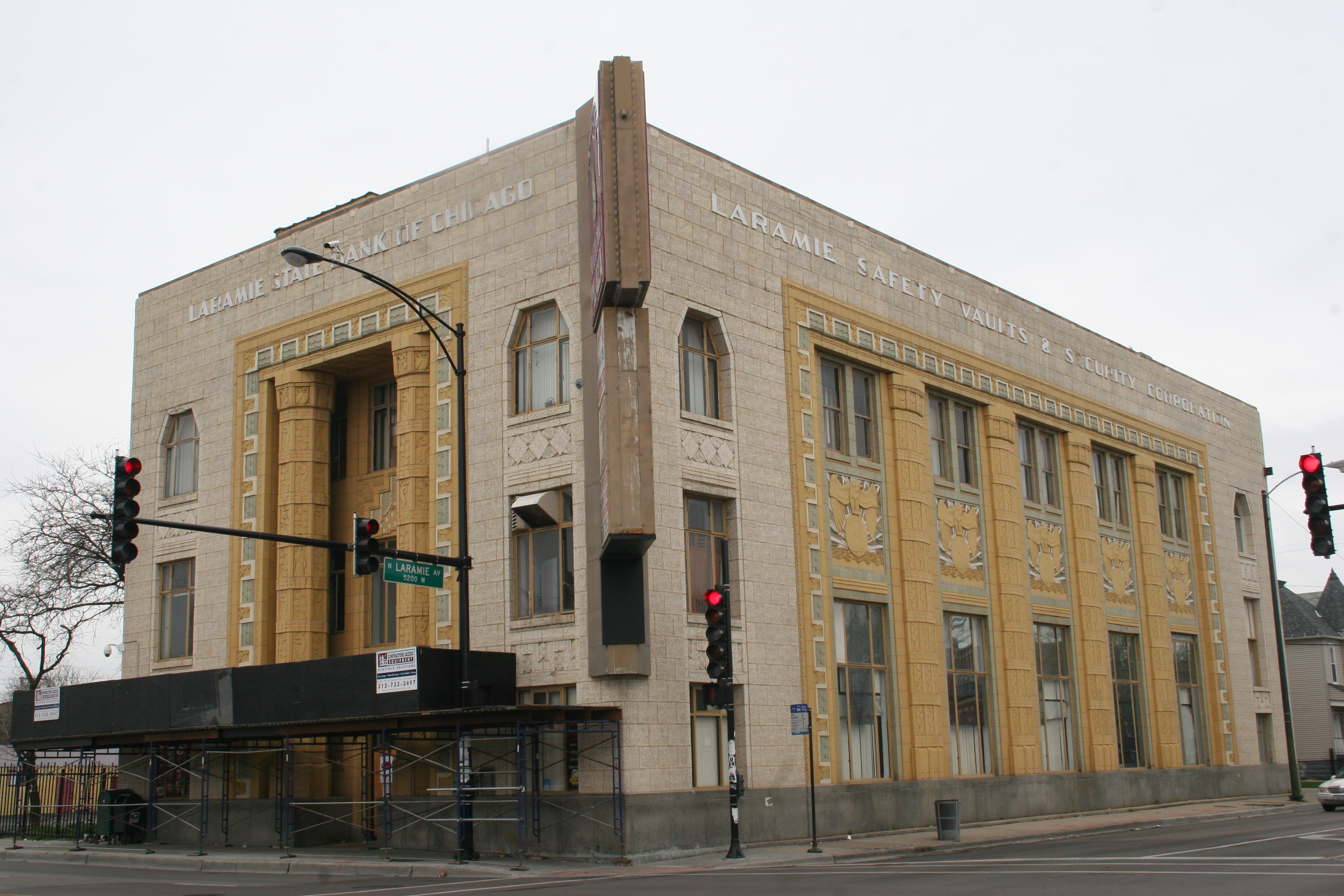

- Location within Chicago metropolitan area Location within Illinois Location within the United States
- Location: 5200 W. Chicago Avenue, Chicago, Illinois
- Coordinates: 41°53′41.4″N 87°45′20.9″W
- Built: 1928
- Architect: Meyer & Cook
- Architectural style: Art Deco
- NRHP reference No.: SG100008873
- Added to NRHP: April 20, 2023

The Laramie State Bank Building is an Art Deco building at 5200 W. Chicago Avenue, in Chicago's Austin community. It was designed by architects Meyer & Cook and was built in 1928. The terracotta ornamentation was produced by the Northwestern Terra Cotta Company. It is a Chicago Landmark, and was listed on the National Register of Historic Places in 2023.

== History ==
The Laramie State Bank of Chicago closed on August 16, 1930. On August 31, 1936, the Federal Housing Administration opened offices in the building. In 1946, the Citizens National Bank began operating in the building. In 1991, the Citizens National Bank was declared insolvent and was seized by federal regulators.

On June 14, 1995, the Laramie State Bank Building was designated a Chicago Landmark. Most recently, the building has served as home to a restaurant and deli, a furniture store, and a banquet hall. However, the building was foreclosed in 2012, and has been vacant for many years. It has a number of deferred maintenance issues, which has led Preservation Chicago to list it as one of the most endangered buildings in Chicago. On August 11, 2020 the Chicago Community Development Commission voted to authorize the Department of Planning and Development to request proposals from developers for the Laramie State Bank Building and adjacent properties.
