= Midway Park, Chicago =

Neighborhood in Chicago, Illinois

Coordinates: 41.888°N 87.771°W

Midway Park is a sub-neighborhood of Austin in Chicago, Illinois. This Chicago landmark district lies both north and south of Lake Avenue. The northerly section is bounded by West Lake Street (400 N), West Ohio Street (600 N), North Waller Avenue (5700 W) and North Austin Street (6000 W). The southerly portion runs north from West End Avenue (200 N) to Corcoran Place (350 N) and west from Parkside Avenue (5650 W) to Menard Avenue (5800 W).

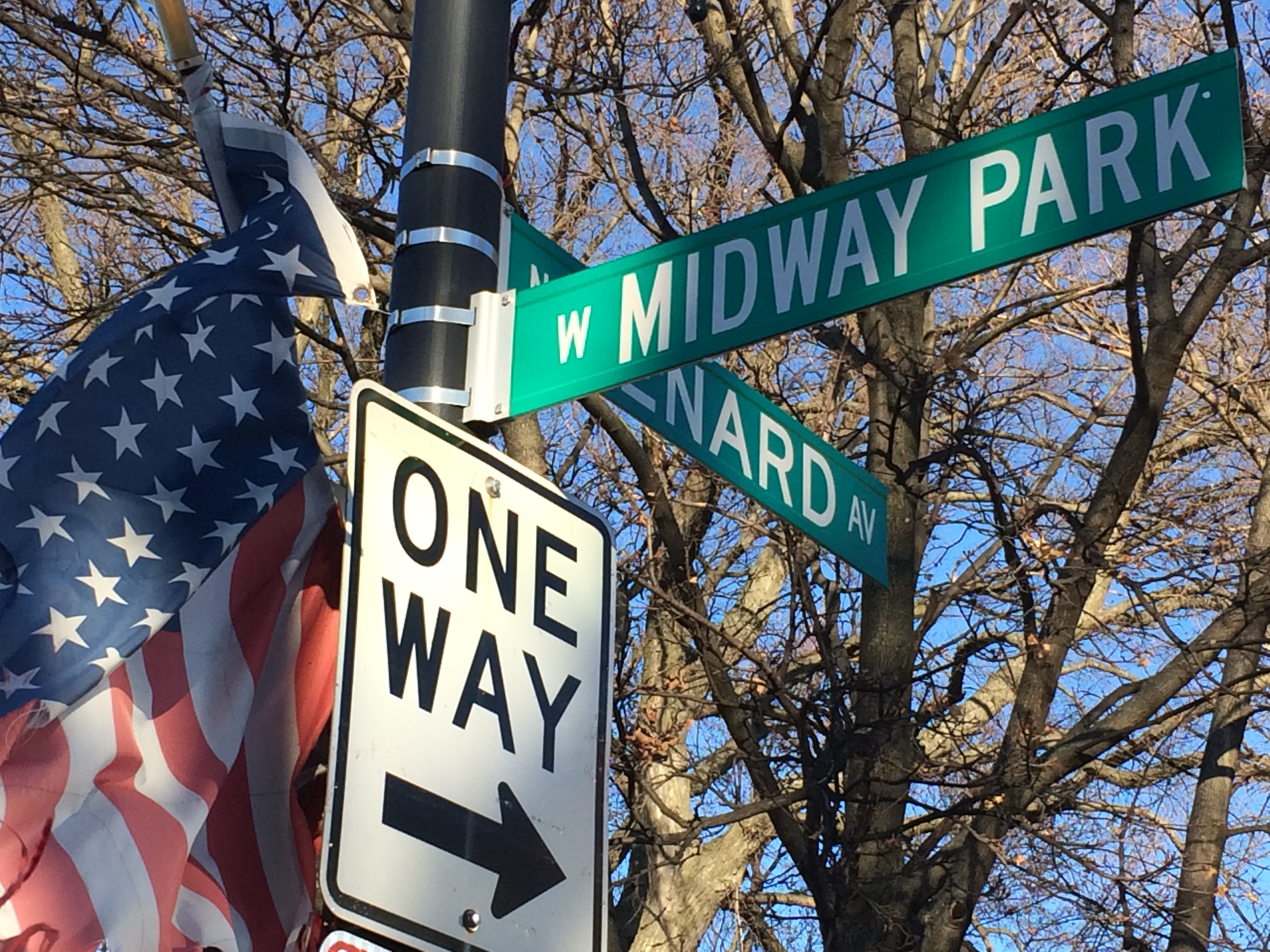
Midway park, chicago

Despite the massive scale change, the nineteenth-century village residential core is still visible in the Midway Park area north of Central and Lake, a designated National Register historic district (1985). This neighborhood boasts stately neoclassical and Queen Anne–style homes, many designed by architect Frederick Schock, as well as several structures by Frank Lloyd Wright and his students.
