= Hitchcock House (Chicago) =

Coordinates: 41°53′28.6″N 87°46′5.1″W

- Interactive map of the Hitchcock House area

General information
- Completed: 1871

The Hitchcock House is a house at 5704 W. Ohio Street in the Austin neighborhood of Chicago, Illinois, United States. The house was built in 1871 (155 years ago) for Charles Hitchcock. It was designated a Chicago Landmark on July 7, 1992.
