= Robert A. Clifford College of Law =

Private law school in Chicago, Illinois, US

Coordinates: 41.8780°N 87.6266°W

- Parent school: DePaul University
- Religious affiliation: Roman Catholic; Vincentian
- Established: 1912 (formed by merger with the Illinois College of Law, 1897)
- School type: Private law school
- Dean: Geoffrey Christopher Rapp
- Location: Chicago, Illinois, US
- Enrollment: 2025 J.D. enrollment (495)
- Faculty: 137 (36 full-time; 101 part-time)
- USNWR ranking: 131st (tie) (2026)
- Bar pass rate: 83.78% (2025 First-time takers)
- Website: law.depaul.edu

The Robert A. Clifford College of Law, formerly known as the DePaul University College of Law from 1912 to 2026, is the law school affiliated with DePaul University, a private Vincentian research university in Chicago, Illinois. It employs more than 38 full-time and 102 part-time faculty members and enrolls nearly 500 students in its Juris Doctor program. The school has multiple joint degree programs offered in conjunction with other DePaul University colleges and schools.

The law school is primarily located in the Lewis Center and includes the Vincent G. Rinn Law Library, Leonard M. Ring Courtroom, technology-enabled classrooms, two student lounges, and student offices and meeting spaces. The law school is located within two blocks of state and federal courts and is close to numerous law firms, corporations and government agencies.

== History ==
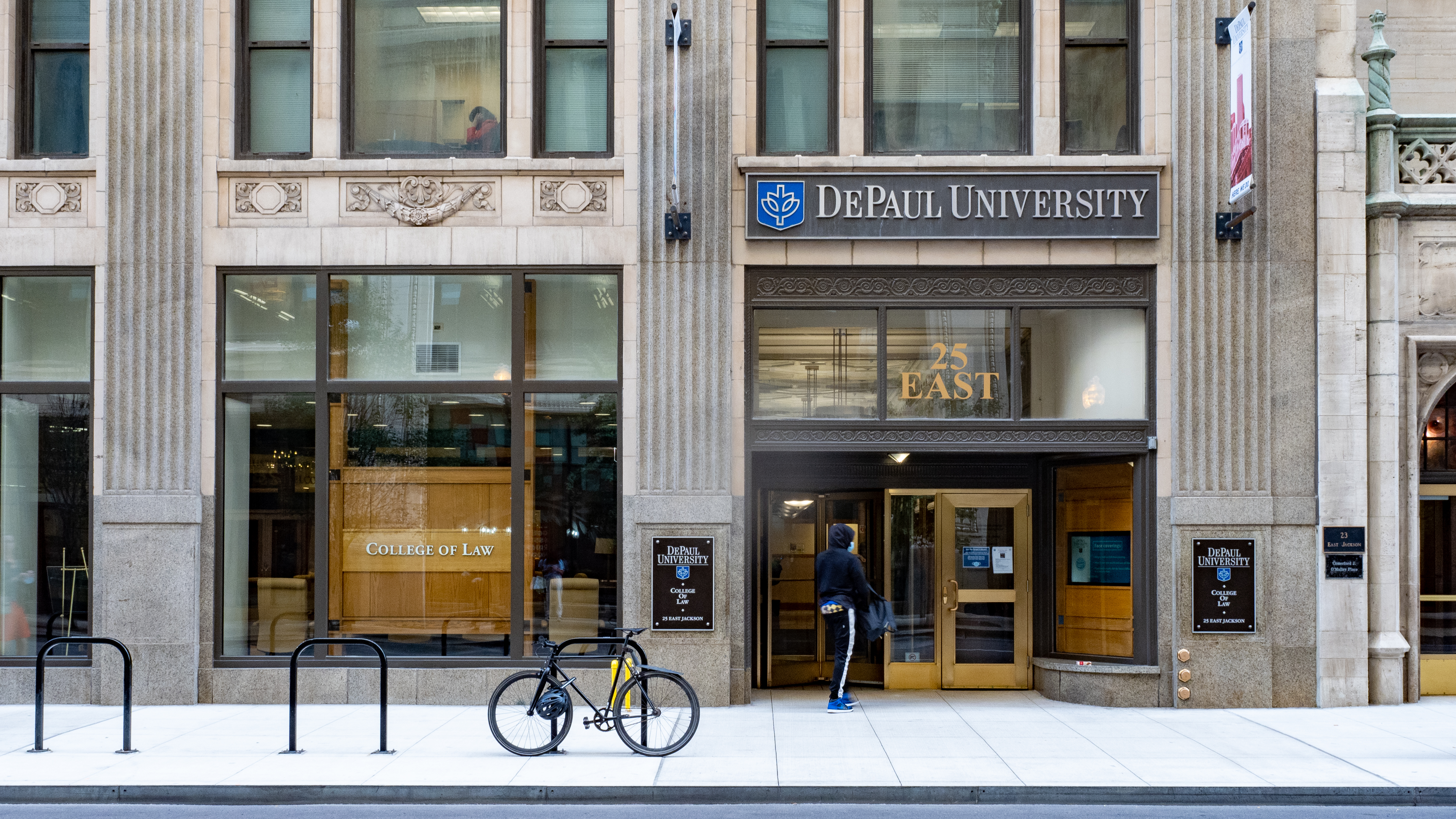
DePaul University College of Law, Lewis Center

The College of Law dates back to 1897 when Howard N. Ogden founded the Illinois College of Law. It was one of the first law schools to offer evening classes.

DePaul University acquired the Illinois College of Law in 1912. This purchase benefited both institutions and saw the law school's enrollment double to approximately 400 students. Ogden stayed on as the College of Law's dean, and he became the first non-Catholic trustee of the University. Three years later, upon Ogden's death, DePaul obtained full ownership of the law school.

Originally housed at 64 East Lake Street, DePaul Law moved to its current home in the Lewis Center at 25 East Jackson Boulevard in 1958. Formerly known as the Kimball Building, it was gifted to DePaul in 1955 by the Frank J. Lewis Foundation. At that time, it was the largest gift ever received by the University.

In 1972, DePaul purchased the Finchley Building next door and later renamed it Comerford J. O'Malley Place (commonly known as "O'Malley Place") in honor of the former president and chancellor of DePaul. Also that year, DePaul Law opened its first legal clinic.

The institution was renamed the Robert A. Clifford College of Law following a US$30 million donation by the namesake and his wife Joan on 26 October 2026.

== Statistics ==
=== Student body ===
The incoming class in 2025 was 158 full-time students and 29 part-time students. The median LSAT score was 158 and the median undergraduate GPA was 3.61.

=== Rankings ===
In 2026, U.S. News & World Report ranked the College of Law as tied for 131st in the Best Law Schools list of 196 schools. The College of Law's Health Care Law program was ranked as the 27th best in the country. The Part-Time Program was ranked 35th out of 68 schools.

=== Degree Programs ===
The College of Law offers a J.D. degree; LL.M degrees in Health Law, Intellectual Property Law & Information Technology, International Law, and U.S. Legal Studies; and a Master of Legal Studies degree. In additional to the College of Law-specific programs, the school offers a variety of dual-degree programs:

- J.D./Master of Business Administration
- J.D./MS in Computer Science
- J.D./MA in International Studies
- J.D./Master of Nonprofit Management
- J.D./Master of Public Administration
- J.D./MS in International Public Service
- J.D./MS in Public Service Management

=== Experiential Learning ===
==== Legal Clinics ====
The College of Law offers numerous legal clinics which allow students to assist clients who are facing real legal issues. Available to second- and third-year students, the law school offers eight in-house and field clinics.

- Asylum & Immigration Law
- Business Law
- Civil Litigation & Health Law
- Criminal Appeals
- Croak Community Legal Clinic
- Family Law
- International Human Rights Law
- Technology/Intellectual Property

=== Moot Court Society and National Trial Team ===
The College of Law's Moot Court Society and National Trial Team enable students to participate in competitions across the country. In 2022, the National Trial Team was named Regional Champions at the American Association for Justice's Student Trial Advocacy Competition, and they placed fifth at Nationals. Also in 2022, the Moot Court team won second place overall at the Chicago Bar Association's Moot Court Competition and its students received Best Oralist and Second Best Oralist awards.

The College of Law also sponsors the Honorable William J. Bauer Moot Court Competition, an annual intramural appellate competition in which student teams analyze and brief a hypothetical appellate problem and argue the case before practicing attorneys and judges.

== Publications ==
The college of Law publishes five student-edited law journals:

- DePaul Law Review The Law Review is the College of Law's flagship law review and its oldest and largest journal and was first published in 1951. It publishes four times a year. The Law Review also hosts a symposium during the spring semester on a variety of topics. Past topics include the power of legal storytelling and cyber regulation.
- DePaul Business and Commercial Law Journal
- DePaul Journal of Art, Technology & Intellectual Property Law
- DePaul Journal of Health Care Law
- DePaul Journal for Social Justice
