= Beeson House and Coach House =

Coordinates: 41.8893°N 87.7705°W

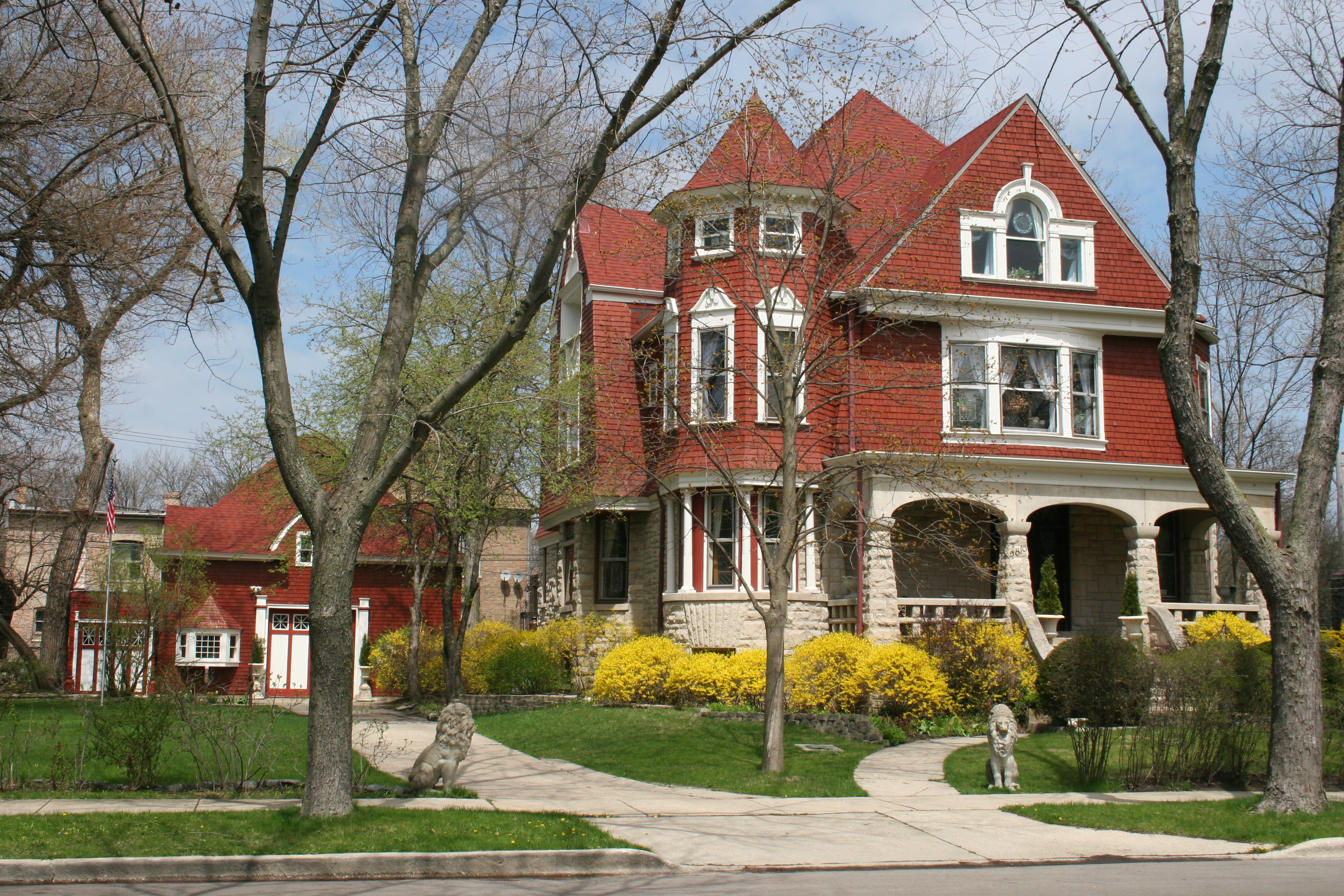
Beeson House and Coach House

The Beeson House and Coach House is a Queen Anne style house located at 5810 West Midway Park in Chicago, Illinois, United States. The house was built in 1892 by Fredrick R. Schock for Fredrick Beeson. It was designated a Chicago Landmark on January 20, 1999.

The Commission on Chicago Landmarks added a historical marker in honor of the Beeson House and three other Schock-designed homes at the intersection of Race and Menard avenues.
