= Leonard M. Ring =

American lawyer from Chicago

Leonard M. Ring (1924 – 1994) was an American lawyer from Chicago.

== Biography ==
Ring attended the University of Louisiana Medical School and the University of New Mexico School of Mines. He served as an Army tank commander in the 12th Armored Division during World War II. In 1949, he obtained his law degree from De Paul University Law School.

Ring held the position of second vice president of the Chicago Bar Association and was set to become its president in 1995. He also held leadership roles in the American Bar Association's Tort and Insurance Practice Section, the Trial Lawyers for Public Justice, the Illinois Trial Lawyers Association, and others.

Ring provided testimony on "no fault" insurance issues before legislative panels and was co-lead counsel in the Extra-Strength Tylenol poisoning cases during the mid-1980s. He represented the Metropolitan Sanitary District in cases concerning Lake Michigan pollution in the late 1970s and early 1980s.

Leonard M. Ring Award and Leonard M. Ring Champion of Justice are named after him.
