= Commission on Chicago Landmarks =

Advisory board

The Commission on Chicago Landmarks is responsible for presenting recommendations of individual buildings, sites, objects, or entire districts to be designated as Chicago Landmarks, therefore providing legal protections. The commission was established in 1968 by a Chicago city ordinance. It is composed of nine members appointed by the mayor and the Chicago City Council and is staffed by the Landmarks Division of the Chicago Department of Planning and Development.

== Landmark requirements ==
To be recommended for landmark status, a building or district must meet at least two criteria: critical part of Chicago's heritage, site of a significant event, association with a significant person, important architecture, important architect, distinctive theme as a district, or unique visual feature. It must also retain a high degree of architectural integrity. The commission is responsible for reviewing proposed alteration, demolition or new construction affecting individual landmarks or properties in landmark districts as part of the permit review process.

In December 2023, the commission had landmarked 384 individual properties, along with 62 landmark districts and nine district extensions.

Current appointed commission members include:

- Ernest C. Wong, Chairman
- Gabriel Ignacio Dziekiewicz
- Richard Tolliver
- Suellen Burns
- Jonathan Fair
- Tiara Hughes
- Alicia Ponce
- Adam Rubin

Ex-Officio:

- Ciere Boatright, DPD Commissioner

== See also ==
- Chicago Plan Commission
- Landmarks Preservation Council of Illinois
- List of Chicago Landmarks
