= National Register of Historic Places listings in West Side Chicago =

There are 79 sites in the National Register of Historic Places listings in West Side, Chicago, out of more than 350 listings in the City of Chicago. The West Side is defined for this article as the area north of the Chicago Sanitary and Ship Canal, south of Fullerton Avenue, west of the Chicago River and east of the western city limits. One site, Logan Square Boulevards Historic District, spans a border and is included also in listings on the North Side. The Chicago Sanitary and Ship Canal Historic District extends through Cook County west of Chicago, DuPage County and Will County to Lockport.

== West Side Chicago listings on the National Register ==
The listed properties are distributed across 9 of the 77 well-defined community areas of Chicago.

This National Park Service list is complete through NPS recent listings posted October 30, 2026.

	Name on the Register	Image	Date listed	Location	Neighborhood	Description
1	2678 W. Washington Boulevard		December 31, 2024 (#100011219)	2678 W. Washington Boulevard; 41°52′59″N 87°41′38″W	East Garfield Park	
2	5401-5415 W. Washington Boulevard - 56-58 N. Long Avenue		September 21, 2026 (#100013405)	5401-5415 W. Washington Boulevard - 56-58 N. Long Avenue; 41°52′56″N 87°45′38″W	Austin	
3	7th District Police Station	7th District Police Station	May 2, 1996 (#96000515)	943-949 W. Maxwell Street; 41°51′52″N 87°39′02″W	Near West Side	Built in 1888. Romanesque Revival police station that served in pacifying the "Bloody Maxwell" area from 1888 to 1988.
4	Austin Historic District	Austin Historic District	August 8, 1985 (#85001741)	Roughly bounded by W. Ohio Street, N. Waller Avenue, N. Parkside Avenue, W. West End Avenue, & N. Mayfield Avenue & W. Corcoran Place; 41°53′12″N 87°46′12″W	Austin	
5	Austin Town Hall Park Historic District	Austin Town Hall Park Historic District	November 15, 2006 (#06001015)	Roughly bounded by W. Lake Street, N. Central Avenue, N. Parkside Avenue, and W. Race Avenue; 41°53′18″N 87°45′57″W	Austin	
6	Automatic Electric Company Building	Automatic Electric Company Building	November 20, 2002 (#02001386)	1001 W. Van Buren Street; 41°52′35″N 87°39′08″W	Near West Side	
7	Building at 900 West Lake Street	Building at 900 West Lake Street	February 12, 1999 (#99000163)	900 W. Lake Street; 41°53′09″N 87°39′00″W	Near West Side	
8	Central Park Theater	Central Park Theater	August 10, 2005 (#05000873)	3535 W. Roosevelt Road; 41°51′59″N 87°42′26″W	North Lawndale	
9	Cermak Road Bridge Historic District	Cermak Road Bridge Historic District	May 1, 2012 (#12000243)	W. Cermak Road. & the South Branch of the Chicago River; 41°51′10″N 87°38′26″W	Lower West Side	
10	Anton Cermak House	Anton Cermak House	February 4, 2011 (#10001201)	2348 S. Millard Avenue; 41°50′54″N 87°42′59″W	South Lawndale	Former home of Chicago Mayor Anton Cermak
11	Chicago and North Western Railway Power House	Chicago and North Western Railway Power House	December 10, 2004 (#04001306)	211 N. Clinton Street; 41°53′11″N 87°38′28″W	Near West Side	
12	Chicago Park Boulevard System Historic District	Chicago Park Boulevard System Historic District	December 18, 2018 (#12000040)	Douglass Park, Gage, McKinley Park, Jackson Park, Sherman Park, Washington Park, Garfield Park & Humboldt Parks, E. Oakwood, S. Drexel Boulevards		
13	Chicago Sanitary and Ship Canal Historic District	Chicago Sanitary and Ship Canal Historic District	December 20, 2011 (#11000907)	Illinois Waterway miles 290.0-321.7; 41°50′05″N 87°41′42″W	Lower West Side and South Lawndale	part of the Illinois Waterway Navigation System Facilities MPS; extends through Cook County west of Chicago, DuPage County and Will County to Lockport
14	Chicago Telephone Company Kedzie Exchange	Chicago Telephone Company Kedzie Exchange	May 30, 2001 (#01000594)	17 S. Homan Avenue; 41°52′49″N 87°42′39″W	East Garfield Park	
15	Church of the Epiphany	Church of the Epiphany	February 5, 1998 (#98000067)	201 S. Ashland Avenue; 41°52′43″N 87°39′59″W	Near West Side	
16	Columbus Park	Columbus Park	May 20, 1991 (#91000567)	500 S. Central Avenue; 41°52′28″N 87°46′10″W	Austin	
17	Cook County Hospital Administration Building	Cook County Hospital Administration Building	November 8, 2006 (#06001017)	1835 W. Harrison Street; 41°52′33″N 87°40′22″W	Near West Side	
18	Creamery Package Manufacturing Company Building	Creamery Package Manufacturing Company Building	November 8, 2011 (#11000778)	1245 W. Washington Boulevard; 41°52′58″N 87°39′30″W	Near West Side	
19	James C. Curtis & Co. Building		December 26, 2024 (#100011204)	1214-1222 W. Van Buren Street; 41°52′36″N 87°39′28″W	Near West Side	
20	Dawson Brothers Plant	Dawson Brothers Plant	February 14, 1985 (#85000265)	517-519 N. Halsted Street; 41°53′31″N 87°38′50″W	West Town	
21	East Village Historic District	East Village Historic District	December 8, 2009 (#09000459)	Bounded by W. Division Street, W. Chicago Avenue, N. Hermitage Avenue and N. Damen Avenue; 41°53′59″N 87°40′26″W	West Town	
22	First Congregational Church of Austin	First Congregational Church of Austin	November 17, 1977 (#77000474)	5701 W. Midway Park; 41°53′19″N 87°46′05″W	Austin	
23	Lucy Flower Technical High School for Girls	Lucy Flower Technical High School for Girls	May 8, 2017 (#100000960)	3545 W. Fulton Boulevard; 41°53′11″N 87°42′56″W	East Garfield Park	
24	Jennie Foley Building	Jennie Foley Building	June 19, 1985 (#85001274)	626-628 S. Racine Avenue; 41°52′24″N 87°39′25″W	Near West Side	
25	Garfield Park	Garfield Park	August 31, 1993 (#93000837)	100 N. Central Park Avenue; 41°53′11″N 87°42′58″W	East Garfield Park	
26	Abraham Groesbeck House	Abraham Groesbeck House	February 4, 1993 (#92001841)	1304 W. Washington Boulevard; 41°52′59″N 87°39′36″W	Near West Side	
27	Guyon Hotel	Guyon Hotel	May 9, 1985 (#85000966)	4000 W. Washington Boulevard; 41°52′55″N 87°43′35″W	West Garfield Park	
28	Holy Trinity Russian Orthodox Cathedral and Rectory	Holy Trinity Russian Orthodox Cathedral and Rectory	March 16, 1976 (#76000693)	1117-1127 N. Leavitt Street; 41°54′07″N 87°40′55″W	West Town	
29	Home Bank and Trust Company	Home Bank and Trust Company	February 21, 2007 (#07000061)	1200 N. Ashland Avenue; 41°54′14″N 87°40′05″W	West Town	
30	Hull House	Hull House	October 15, 1966 (#66000315)	800 S. Halsted Street; 41°52′17″N 87°38′49″W	Near West Side	
31	Humboldt Park	Humboldt Park	February 20, 1992 (#92000074)	Roughly bounded by N. Sacramento Boulevard and W. Augusta Boulevard, and N. Kedzie Avenue, W. North Avenue and N. California Avenue and W. Division Street; 41°54′12″N 87°42′10″W	West Town	
32	Immanuel Lutheran Church and Parsonage	Immanuel Lutheran Church and Parsonage	April 15, 2024 (#100010215)	1124-1134 S. Ashland Avenue; 41°52′03″N 87°40′00″W	Near West Side	
33	International Tailoring Company Building	International Tailoring Company Building	April 18, 2008 (#07001474)	847 W. Jackson Boulevard; 41°52′40″N 87°38′57″W	Near West Side	
34	Jewish People's Institute	Jewish People's Institute	November 15, 1978 (#78001122)	3500 W. Douglas Boulevard; 41°51′47″N 87°42′47″W	North Lawndale	
35	K-Town Historic District	K-Town Historic District	September 9, 2010 (#10000724)	Bounded on the north by W. Cullerton Street; on the south by W. Cermak Road, on the west by S. Kostner Avenue, and on the east by S. Pulaski Road; 41°51′11″N 87°43′47″W	North Lawndale	
36	Patrick J. King House	Patrick J. King House	February 10, 1983 (#83000311)	3234 W. Washington Boulevard; 41°52′58″N 87°42′27″W	East Garfield Park	
37	Laramie State Bank Building	Laramie State Bank Building	April 20, 2023 (#100008873)	5200 W. Chicago Avenue; 41°53′42″N 87°45′21″W	Austin	
38	Henry E. Legler Regional Branch of the Chicago Public Library	Henry E. Legler Regional Branch of the Chicago Public Library	November 6, 1986 (#86003169)	115 S. Pulaski Road; 41°52′46″N 87°43′31″W	West Garfield Park	
39	Lindemann and Hoverson Company Showroom and Warehouse	Lindemann and Hoverson Company Showroom and Warehouse	November 26, 2008 (#08001095)	2620 W. Washington Boulevard; 41°52′59″N 87°41′31″W	East Garfield Park	
40	Logan Square Boulevards Historic District	Logan Square Boulevards Historic District	November 20, 1985 (#85002901)	W. Logan Boulevard, Logan Square, N. Kedzie Boulevard, Palmer Square, and N. Humboldt Boulevard; 41°55′16″N 87°42′16″W	Logan Square	Three boulevards connected by two parks, on both the North Side and West Sides.
41	Lou Mitchell's Restaurant	Lou Mitchell's Restaurant	May 5, 2006 (#06000376)	565 W. Jackson Boulevard; 41°52′38″N 87°38′30″W	Near West Side	
42	Mid-City Trust and Savings Bank		August 23, 2023 (#100009254)	801 W. Madison Street; 41°52′54″N 87°38′51″W	Near West Side	
43	Midwest Athletic Club	Midwest Athletic Club	October 18, 1984 (#84000138)	6 N. Hamlin Avenue; 41°52′52″N 87°43′16″W	West Garfield Park	
44	John Lothrop Motley School	John Lothrop Motley School	September 5, 2017 (#100001562)	739 N. Ada Street; 41°53′44″N 87°39′40″W	West Town	
45	Notre Dame de Chicago	Notre Dame de Chicago	March 7, 1979 (#79000826)	1338 W. Flournoy Street; 41°52′24″N 87°39′39″W	Near West Side	
46	Otis Elevator Company Factory Building	Otis Elevator Company Factory Building	November 26, 2008 (#08001097)	1435 W. 15th Street and 1501 S. Laflin Street; 41°51′41″N 87°39′44″W	Near West Side	
47	Our Lady of Lourdes Parish		April 15, 2025 (#100011690)	4208 West 15th Street; 41°51′39″N 87°43′49″W	North Lawndale	
48	Elizabeth Peabody School	Elizabeth Peabody School	December 26, 2017 (#100001923)	1444 W. Augusta Boulevard; 41°53′59″N 87°39′50″W	West Town	
49	Pilsen Historic District	Pilsen Historic District	February 1, 2006 (#10240018)	Roughly bounded by W. 16th Street, W. Cermak Road, S. Halsted Street and S. Western Avenue; 41°51′14″N 87°40′13″W	Lower West Side	
50	Pioneer Trust and Savings Bank	Pioneer Trust and Savings Bank	September 21, 2023 (#100009372)	4000 W. North Avenue; 41°54′36″N 87°43′35″W	Humboldt Park	
51	Polish National Alliance Headquarters	Polish National Alliance Headquarters	December 23, 2014 (#14001063)	1514-1520 W. Division Street; 41°54′12″N 87°39′57″W	West Town	
52	Polish Roman Catholic Union of America	Polish Roman Catholic Union of America	January 2, 2013 (#12001114)	984 N. Milwaukee Avenue; 41°53′58″N 87°39′40″W	West Town	
53	Produce Terminal Cold Storage Company Building	Produce Terminal Cold Storage Company Building	June 22, 2003 (#03000538)	1550 S. Blue Island Avenue; 41°51′38″N 87°39′35″W	Near West Side	
54	Pulaski Park and Fieldhouse	Pulaski Park and Fieldhouse	August 13, 1981 (#81000217)	1419 W. Blackhawk Street; 41°54′21″N 87°39′47″W	West Town	
55	Pyle-National Company Plant		January 19, 2021 (#100006017)	1334 N. Kostner Avenue; 41°54′21″N 87°44′11″W	Humboldt Park	
56	Royalton Hotel	Royalton Hotel	September 5, 2024 (#100010782)	1810 W. Jackson Boulevard; 41°52′39″N 87°40′20″W	Near West Side	
57	St. Ignatius College	St. Ignatius College	November 17, 1977 (#77000480)	1076 W. Roosevelt Road; 41°52′03″N 87°39′06″W	Near West Side	
58	St. Matthew Evangelical Lutheran School	St. Matthew Evangelical Lutheran School	January 27, 2000 (#99001710)	2101-2107 W. 21st Street; 41°51′13″N 87°40′43″W	Lower West Side	
59	St. Patrick's Roman Catholic Church	St. Patrick's Roman Catholic Church	July 15, 1977 (#77000481)	718 W. Adams Street; 41°52′45″N 87°38′40″W	Near West Side	
60	Schoenhofen Brewery Historic District	Schoenhofen Brewery Historic District	December 27, 1978 (#78001128)	Roughly bounded by W. 16th Street, W. 18th Street, S. Canal Street, and S. Clinton Street; 41°51′31″N 87°38′22″W	Lower West Side	
61	Sears, Roebuck and Company Complex	Sears, Roebuck and Company Complex	June 2, 1978 (#78001129)	925 S. Homan Avenue; 41°52′10″N 87°42′42″W	North Lawndale	
62	Shedd Park Fieldhouse	Shedd Park Fieldhouse	December 30, 1974 (#74000755)	3660 W. 23rd Street; 41°51′01″N 87°43′01″W	South Lawndale	
63	J. P. Smith Shoe Company Plant	J. P. Smith Shoe Company Plant	November 14, 1985 (#85002842)	685 N. Sangamon Avenue and 911 W. Huron Street; 41°53′41″N 87°39′03″W	West Town	
64	South Water Market	South Water Market	August 20, 2004 (#04000870)	Bounded by W. 14th Place, the 16th Street rail embankment, S. Racine Avenue, and S. Morgan Street; 41°51′42″N 87°39′15″W	Near West Side	
65	Stone Temple Baptist Church		December 21, 2022 (#100008484)	3622 W. Douglas Boulevard; 41°51′46″N 87°42′59″W	North Lawndale	
66	Storkline Furniture Corporation Factory	Storkline Furniture Corporation Factory	March 6, 2013 (#13000049)	4400-4418 W. 26th Street; 41°50′42″N 87°44′05″W	South Lawndale	Destroyed in a fire in 2016.
67	Story-Camp Rowhouses	Story-Camp Rowhouses	May 8, 1980 (#80001351)	1526-1528 W. Monroe Street; 41°52′48″N 87°39′57″W	Near West Side	
68	Third Church of Christ, Scientist	Third Church of Christ, Scientist	October 24, 2016 (#16000733)	2151 W. Washington Boulevard; 41°52′59″N 87°40′53″W	Near West Side	
69	Tri-Taylor Historic District	Tri-Taylor Historic District	March 3, 1983 (#83000315)	Roughly bounded by S. Claremont Avenue, W. Harrison Street, S. Oakley Avenue, W. Polk Street, W. Ogden Avenue, and W. Roosevelt Road; also roughly bounded on the north by Oakley, Harrison, and Claremont Streets, and on the southeast by Taylor and Oakley Streets; 41°52′13″N 87°41′00″W	Near West Side	Second set of boundaries represents a boundary increase of February 3, 1988
70	Union Park Congregational Church and Carpenter Chapel	Union Park Congregational Church and Carpenter Chapel	May 31, 2006 (#06000446)	1613 W. Washington Boulevard; 41°53′06″N 87°40′03″W	Near West Side	Now known as First Baptist Congregational Church; built in 1871; severely damaged in the February 2, 2011 blizzard
71	Union Park Hotel	Union Park Hotel	June 7, 2010 (#10000309)	1519-1521 W. Warren Boulevard; 41°52′56″N 87°39′58″W	Near West Side	
72	United States Customs House	United States Customs House	August 4, 2016 (#16000492)	610 S. Canal Street; 41°52′27″N 87°38′23″W	Near West Side	
73	United States Post Office-Chicago	United States Post Office-Chicago	August 16, 2001 (#01000868)	433 W. Van Buren Street; 41°52′34″N 87°38′19″W	Near West Side	
74	Joseph J. Walser House	Joseph J. Walser House	April 23, 2013 (#13000185)	42 N. Central Avenue; 41°52′54″N 87°45′55″W	Austin	Frank Lloyd Wright, 1903
75	Seth Warner House	Seth Warner House	June 3, 1982 (#82002531)	631 N. Central Avenue; 41°53′31″N 87°45′54″W	Austin	
76	Washington Manor Apartments		September 21, 2026 (#100013406)	5113-5123 W. Washington Boulevard; 41°52′54″N 87°45′13″W	Austin	
77	West Jackson Boulevard District	West Jackson Boulevard District	May 19, 1978 (#78001134)	Roughly bounded by S. Laflin Avenue, S. Ashland Avenue, W. Adams Street, and W. Van Buren Street; also 1513 W. Adams Street; 41°52′39″N 87°39′55″W	Near West Side	Second set of boundaries represents a boundary increase of October 19, 1989
78	Wholesale Florists Exchange	Wholesale Florists Exchange	November 22, 2011 (#11000849)	1313 W. Randolph Street; 41°53′03″N 87°39′34″W	Near West Side	
79	Wicker Park Historic District	Wicker Park Historic District	June 20, 1979 (#79000831)	Roughly bounded by N. Wood Street, W. Crystal Street, N. Caton Street, N. Claremont Avenue and W. North Avenue; 41°54′26″N 87°40′20″W	West Town	

== Former listings ==
	Name on the Register	Image	Date listed	Date removed	Location	City or town	Description
1	Francisco Terrace Apartments	Francisco Terrace Apartments	March 26, 1973 (#73002260)	January 28, 1974	257 N. Francisco Avenue	East Garfield Park	Designed by Frank Lloyd Wright. Although it was demolished in 1974, the facade was moved to Oak Park in 1977.
2	Scoville Building	Scoville Building	July 31, 1973 (#73002261)	March 15, 1975	625 W. Washington Street	Near West Side	Demolished

== Key ==
	NRHP-listed
^{∞}	NRHP-listed Historic district
*	National Historic Landmark and NRHP-listed
^{∞}	National Historic Landmark and NRHP-listed Historic district

== See also ==
- List of Chicago Landmarks
- List of Registered Historic Places in Illinois
- List of National Historic Landmarks in Illinois
  - National Register of Historic Places listings in Central Chicago
  - National Register of Historic Places listings in North Side Chicago
  - National Register of Historic Places listings in South Side Chicago
