= Otis Elevator Company Building =

Otis Elevator Company Building may refer to:

- Otis Elevator Company Building (San Francisco, California), listed on the National Register of Historic Places (NRHP) in San Francisco, California
- Otis Elevator Company Factory Building, Chicago, Illinois, listed on the National Register of Historic Places in Chicago, Illinois
- Otis Elevator Company Building (Portland, Oregon), NRHP-listed
- Otis Building a 16-story high rise at 10 South LaSalle Street in Chicago, Illinois, begun in 1913 and now demolished
