= East Village Historic District =

East Village Historic District may refer to:

in the United States (by state)

- East Village Historic District (Chicago), listed on the NRHP in Chicago, Illinois
- East Village Historic District (Amherst, Massachusetts), listed on the NRHP in Massachusetts
- East Village Historic District (Milwaukee), listed on the NRHP in Wisconsin
