= Victorian Railways K class =

Class of Australian 2-8-0 steam locomotives

- K 100 photographed at Newport Workshops in as built condition.
Type and origin
- Power type: Steam
- Builder: VR Newport Workshops
- Build date: 1922-1946
- Total produced: 53
Specifications
- Configuration
  - Whyte: 2-8-0
- Gauge: 5 ft 3 in (1,600 mm)
- Driver dia.: 55 in (1,397 mm)
- Length: 60 ft 3 1/2 in (18.38 m)
- Axle load: 13 long tons 10 cwt (30,200 lb or 13.7 t)
- Adhesive weight: 53 long tons 2 cwt (118,900 lb or 54 t)
- Loco weight: 62 long tons 7 cwt (139,700 lb or 63.4 t)
- Tender weight: 42 long tons 5 cwt (94,600 lb or 42.9 t)
- Total weight: 104 long tons 12 cwt (234,300 lb or 106.3 t)
- Fuel type: Coal
- Fuel capacity: 5 long tons 0 cwt (11,200 lb or 5.1 t)
- Water cap.: 4,200 imp gal (19,000 L; 5,000 US gal)
- Firebox
  - Grate area: 25 3/4 sq ft (2.39 m^{2})
- Boiler pressure: 175 psi (12.1 bar; 1,210 kPa)
- Heating surface: 1,680 sq ft (156 m^{2})
- Cylinders: 2
- Cylinder size: 20 in × 26 in (508 mm × 660 mm)
- Valve gear: Walschaerts
- Valve type: Piston valves
Performance figures
- Tractive effort: 28,650 lbf (127,400 N) at 85% boiler pressure
Career
- Operators: Victorian Railways
- Number in class: 53
- Numbers: 100-109 (later 140-149), 150-192.
- Delivered: 1922
- First run: 22 August 1922
- Last run: 13 March 1982
- Retired: 13 March 1982
- Withdrawn: 1958-1982
- Preserved: 151, 153, 154, 157, 159, 160, 162, 163, 165, 167, 169, 174, 175, 176, 177, 181, 183, 184, 190, 191, 192.
- Current owner: Various heritage groups
- Disposition: 21 preserved, 32 scrapped

The K class is a branch line steam locomotive that ran on Victorian Railways in Australia from 1922 to 1979. Although its design was entirely conventional and its specifications unremarkable, the K class was in practice a remarkably versatile and dependable locomotive. It went on to outlast every other class of steam locomotive in regular service on the VR, and no fewer than 21 examples of the 53 originally built have survived into preservation.

== History ==
The K class was the first design from the VR Locomotive Design Section under the stewardship of Alfred E Smith as Chief Mechanical Engineer.

The Locomotive Design Section had introduced successful mainline and branchline passenger locomotives with the A2 class and Dd class 4-6-0s, and had recently improved mainline goods services with the C class 2-8-0. They now turned their attention to a requirement for a more powerful branchline goods locomotive, and in 1922 produced a lighter 2-8-0 "Consolidation" locomotive with a 13 1/2 long tons (13.7 t; 15.1 short tons) axle load and 50 ft (15.24 m) wheelbase, able to run on even the lightest lines on the VR 5 ft 3 in (1,600 mm) system.

=== Regular service ===
The K class is credited with working virtually every line in the VR system and hauling almost every kind of train.

A total of ten were built from 1922 to 1923, numbered 100–109. They were put to work on goods services on steeply graded branch lines where their superior tractive effort (45% higher than that of the Dd class) and high factor of adhesion were put to good use.

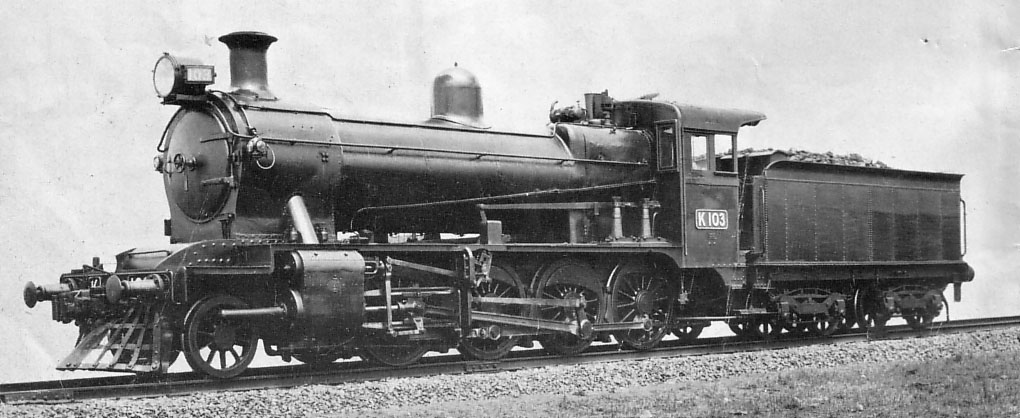
VR photo of K 103 circa 1935, with automatic couplers and an electric headlight

The design was modified in 1925 into the N class 2-8-2, in response to a new Victorian Railways policy that all new locomotives be capable of conversion from 5 ft 3 in (1,600 mm) to 4 ft 8 1/2 in (1,435 mm) standard gauge in the event of the Victorian Railways network being standardised. The K, with its firebox mounted between the frames, was unsuitable for standard gauge conversion. The K class proved to be such a successful locomotive that, despite not being gauge convertible, a further 29 units were ordered just before World War II, being delivered between 1940 and 1941. The first of the new engines was 140, quickly renumbered 150 then followed by 151 to 178; the original ten engines were also renumbered 140–149. In 1942 a further order was placed for an additional 21 engines, which would have brought the fleet total to 61 engines. However, only five of this batch - 179 to 183 - entered service during 1943, and construction was halted until after the end of hostilities when work resumed on engines K184 to K192. The remaining engines were never built.

The decision to build more Ks reflected their greater versatility: they had the same tractive effort as the N class but unlike the longer wheelbase N class the K could be turned on the smallest (53-foot or 16.15-metre) turntables.

Although originally designed as a goods locomotive, their maximum permissible speed was raised for branchline passenger service, further increasing their versatility.

The success of the K class was such that even in 1953, with dieselisation already underway on Victorian Railways, the basic design of the K class was updated into the J class 2-8-0, the final class of steam locomotives to be introduced to the Victorian Railways.

K Class Locomotive History
Original No.	Date On Register	Pending	Second No.	Date No. change	Auto Couplers	Electric Light	Modified Front End	Staff Exchanger	Blowdown Muffler	Shunters' Steps	Mileage	Off Register	Broken Up	Comments
100	22 August 1922	RSRF 56	140	18 September 1940	30 August 1934	19 January 1935	16 October 1941	16 October 1941		21 July 1959	781,947 mi (1,258,422 km)	22 July 1964		
101	10 November 1922		141	4 June 1940	1 November 1934	1 May 1931	28 February 1942	28 February 1942		11 June 1959	853,472 mi (1,373,530 km)	14 March 1962		
102	28 November 1922		142	3 September 1940	23 November 1934	23 November 1934	16 May 1946	16 May 1946			734,034 mi (1,181,313 km)	8 August 1958		
103	9 December 1922		143	28 June 1940	2 March 1933	18 January 1935	7 June 1946	7 June 1946		1959	757,322 mi (1,218,792 km)	10 September 1959		
104	19 December 1922		144	4 October 1940	9 August 1933	21 December 1934	15 November 1944	15 November 1944	4 August 1949	October 1959	846,792 mi (1,362,780 km)	6 May 1960		
105	21 December 1922		145	2 October 1940	18 November 1933	26 October 2029 [sic]	11 November 1946	11 November 1946			759,461 mi (1,222,234 km)	29 October 1958		
106	27 March 1923		146	4 July 1940	20 July 1933	1 December 1934	27 April 1945	27 April 1945		17 June 1959	845,861 mi (1,361,281 km)	12 December 1960		
107	18 May 1923		147	29 June 1940	31 May 1934	10 November 1934	1 February 1946	1 February 1946	17 September 1951	21 July 1959	827,135 mi (1,331,145 km)	7 July 1965		
108	18 June 1923		148	10 June 1940	18 July 1934	24 November 1934	11 December 1947	11 December 1947		3 July 1959	787,353 mi (1,267,122 km)	15 February 1960		
109	30 June 1923		149	12 October 1940	22 December 1934	22 December 1934	8 November 1944	8 November 1944		9 June 1959	748,274 mi (1,204,230 km)	12 October 1967		
140	28 May 1940	RS 39/3785 21/7/39	150	18 September 1940	28 May 1940	28 May 1940	28 May 1940	17 September 1947	19 April 1951	28 May 1959	439,982 mi (708,082 km)	8 November 1967		
151	1 July 1940				1 July 1940	1 July 1940	1 July 1940	12 February 1948		14 August 1959	455,210 mi (732,589 km)	23 May 1973		
152	23 August 1940				23 August 1940	23 August 1940	23 August 1940	18 June 1948		22 June 1959	446,828 mi (719,100 km)	30 August 1967		
153	9 September 1940				9 September 1940	9 September 1940	9 September 1940	12 September 1947		11 May 1959	473,601 mi (762,187 km)	7 December 1972		
154	21 September 1940				21 September 1940	21 September 1940	21 September 1940	28 April 1948		22 June 1959	454,086 mi (730,781 km)	27 June 1971		
155	11 October 1940				11 October 1940	11 October 1940	11 October 1940	15 June 1948		30 July 1959	440,133 mi (708,325 km)	24 April 1968		
156	29 October 1940				29 October 1940	29 October 1940	29 October 1940	13 July 1948		16 June 1959	444,385 mi (715,168 km)	8 October 1969		
157	16 November 1940				16 November 1940	16 November 1940	16 November 1940	13 May 1948		22 June 1959	460,286 mi (740,759 km)	7 December 1972		
158	25 November 1940				25 November 1940	25 November 1940	25 November 1940	20 September 1946		17 June 1959	430,211 mi (692,357 km)	7 January 1974	23 June 1978	
159	6 December 1940				6 December 1940	6 December 1940	6 December 1940	19 March 1948		22 June 1959	404,469 mi (650,930 km)	24 April 1975		
160	22 December 1940				22 December 1940	22 December 1940	22 December 1940	22 December 1940		11 May 1959	427,498 mi (687,991 km)	1979		
161	23 January 1941				23 January 1941	23 January 1941	23 January 1941	23 January 1941		16 June 1959	491,680 mi (791,282 km)	13 September 1967		
162	25 February 1941				25 February 1941	25 February 1941	25 February 1941	25 February 1941		23 February 1960	467,422 mi (752,243 km)	7 December 1972		
163	19 March 1941				19 March 1941	19 March 1941	19 March 1941	19 March 1941	16 September 1949	26 May 1959	420,061 mi (676,023 km)	18 November 1973		
164	8 April 1941				8 April 1941	8 April 1941	8 April 1941	8 April 1941	18 November 1949	22 June 1959	476,940 mi (767,561 km)	12 August 1971		
165	27 May 1941	RS 39/3785 21/7/39			27 May 1941	27 May 1941	27 May 1941	27 May 1941		11 May 1959	480,115 mi (772,670 km)	23 September 1968		
166	10 June 1941				10 June 1941	10 June 1941	10 June 1941	10 June 1941		12 November 1959	429,939 mi (691,920 km)	18 November 1966		
167	24 June 1971 [sic]				24 June 1971 [sic]	24 June 1971 [sic]	24 June 1971 [sic]	24 June 1971 [sic]	30 September 1949	22 June 1959	394,776 mi (635,330 km)	23 November 1970		
168	9 July 1941				9 July 1941	9 July 1941	9 July 1941	9 July 1941		June 1959	477,609 mi (768,637 km)	7 July 1967		
169	28 July 1941				28 July 1941	28 July 1941	28 July 1941	28 July 1941		11 May 1959	426,708 mi (686,720 km)	3 February 1973		
170	2 September 1941				2 September 1941	2 September 1941	2 September 1941	2 September 1941	20 December 1949	16 July 1959	457,641 mi (736,502 km)	15 August 1967	24 September 1969	
171	11 September 1941				11 September 1941	11 September 1941	11 September 1941	11 September 1941	20 April 1951	16 September 1959	442,813 mi (712,638 km)	10 March 1966		
172	21 October 1941				21 October 1941	21 October 1941	21 October 1941	21 October 1941		22 June 1959	396,099 mi (637,460 km)	27 September 1967		
173	29 October 1941				29 October 1941	29 October 1941	29 October 1941	29 October 1941		22 June 1959	475,236 mi (764,818 km)	21 October 1971		
174	7 November 1941				7 November 1941	7 November 1941	7 November 1941	7 November 1941	17 February 1950	3 July 1959	401,309 mi (645,844 km)	24 April 1975		
175	17 November 1941				17 November 1941	17 November 1941	17 November 1941	17 November 1941		25 June 1959	290,355 mi (467,281 km)	23 May 1973		
176	28 November 1941				28 November 1941	28 November 1941	28 November 1941	28 November 1941		6 May 1959	390,301 mi (628,129 km)	16 September 1972		
177	5 December 1941				5 December 1941	5 December 1941	5 December 1941	5 December 1941		26 May 1959	386,602 mi (622,176 km)	11 October 1972		
178	17 December 1941				17 December 1941	17 December 1941	17 December 1941	17 December 1941	29 September 1949	1 July 1959	424,200 mi (682,684 km)	8 May 1968		
179	2 April 1943				2 April 1943	2 April 1943	2 April 1943	2 April 1943		5 December 1959	385,570 mi (620,515 km)	11 October 1967		
180	29 April 1943				29 April 1943	29 April 1943	29 April 1943	29 April 1943		11 May 1959	376,313 mi (605,617 km)	16 August 1967		
181	1 June 1943				1 June 1943	1 June 1943	1 June 1943	1 June 1943		29 June 1959	399,042 mi (642,196 km)	5 December 1968		
182	4 August 1943				4 August 1943	4 August 1943	4 August 1943	4 August 1943		29 June 1959	364,123 mi (585,999 km)	28 January 1966		
183	9 September 1943				9 September 1943	9 September 1943	9 September 1943	9 September 1943		1959	351,457 mi (565,615 km)	2 December 1976		
184	9 January 1946				9 January 1946	9 January 1946	9 January 1946	9 January 1946	7 March 1950	1959	334,417 mi (538,192 km)	7 December 1972		
185	22 January 1946				22 January 1946	22 January 1946	22 January 1946	22 January 1946		October 1959	353,076 mi (568,221 km)	21 July 1967		
186	19 March 1946	RS 42/6756 16/6/42			19 March 1946	19 March 1946	19 March 1946	19 March 1946		1959	333,213 mi (536,254 km)	25 October 1967		
187	18 April 1946				18 April 1946	18 April 1946	18 April 1946	18 April 1946		12 June 1959	320,018 mi (515,019 km)	3 February 1971		
188	24 May 1946				24 May 1946	24 May 1946	24 May 1946	24 May 1946		27 May 1979	314,127 mi (505,538 km)	15 August 1967	31 January 1968	
189	1 July 1946				1 July 1946	1 July 1946	1 July 1946	1 July 1946		9 June 1959	342,754 mi (551,609 km)	22 November 1967		
190	20 August 1946				20 August 1946	20 August 1946	20 August 1946	20 August 1946		29 July 1959	304,625 mi (490,246 km)	7 December 1972		
191	20 September 1946				20 September 1946	20 September 1946	20 September 1946	20 September 1946		November 1959	228,671 mi (368,010 km)	10 April 1968		
192	31 October 1946				31 October 1946	31 October 1946	31 October 1946	31 October 1946	30 October 1951	14 August 1959	251,878 mi (405,358 km)	18 December 1968		
193		RS 43/5003 7/5/43 Cancelled												
194														
195														
196														
197														
198														
199														

=== Design improvements ===
During the mid-1930s, the original batch of ten K class locomotives were equipped with VR's 'Modified Front End' for improved drafting and reduced cylinder back pressure. They also saw other improvements, such as the fitting of cross-compound air compressors, conversion from lattice pilots to plate, addition of Pyle-National Company Plant lights and equipment, smoke deflectors and a new welded tender tank which incorporated a self-trimming coal bunker.

The last seven of the second order of K class locomotives built in 1940-46 were fitted with Boxpok wheels.

=== Demise ===
The introduction of the T class (EMD G8) diesel electric locomotive from 1955 onwards on VR's branchline network spelled the beginning of the end for the K class, with Ks gradually being retired as successive orders of Ts were delivered throughout the 1950s and into the 1960s. Even so, their reliable and low-cost operability ensured they remained in service around various yards and depots as shunters and workshop pilots until the Y class (EMD G6B) locomotive eventually superseded them in this role.

On 20 January 1965, locomotive K 188 was used in a public ending of steam on the Victorian Railways, when it was used in the demolition of the North Melbourne Locomotive Depot, pulling down the front wall with a steel rope before a crowd of onlookers. North Ballarat Workshops pilot K 162 had the honour of being the last steam locomotive in service on Victorian Railways, withdrawn in March 1979, and was subsequently allocated to Steamrail Victoria.

== Preservation ==
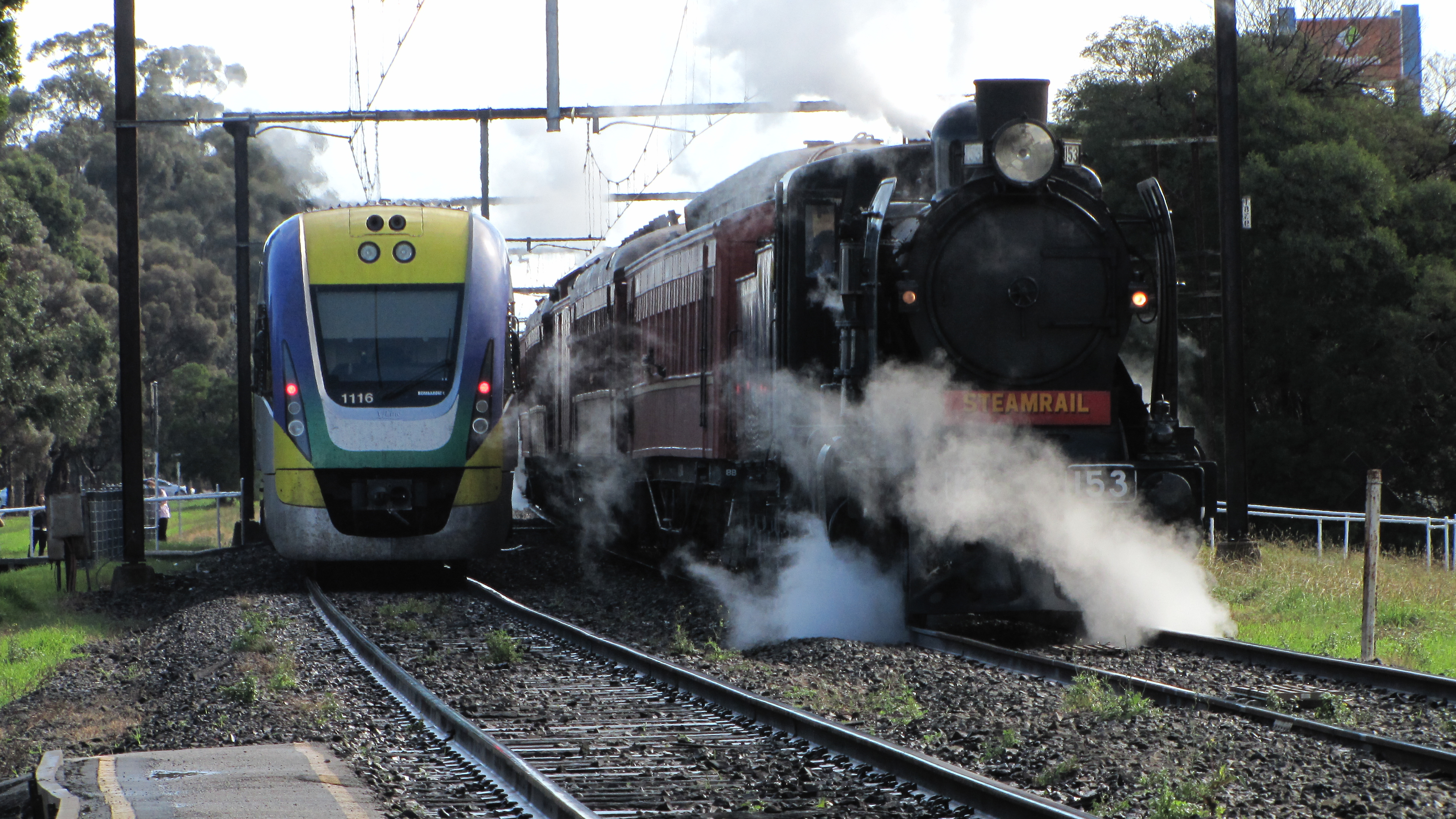
K 153 (at right) passes the V/Line VLocity at Pakenham, April 2010

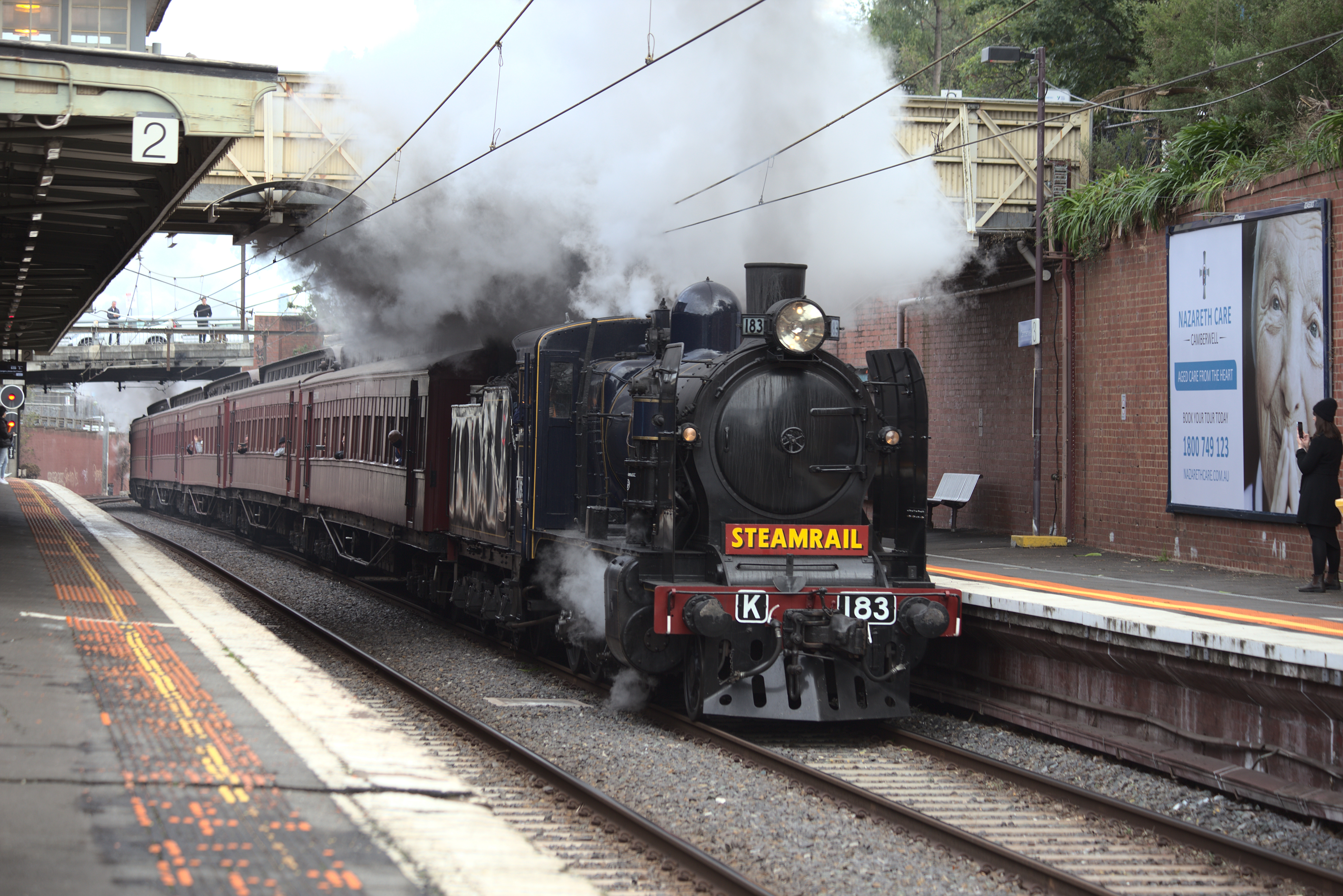
Steamrail K183 at Camberwell on a top and tail steam shuttle trip to Belgrave, May 2022

With the rail preservation movement gaining momentum by the late 1960s, many ex-VR locomotives were sold to local councils or museums for display in municipal parks or near railway stations. The K class held a distinct advantage in this market because the Victorian Railways offered the locomotives for the price of their scrap value, including freight. As a relatively lightweight locomotive, the K was a much more affordable purchase for local communities than larger locomotives. This affordability resulted in a high survival rate for the K class, which stands in stark contrast to the fate of the remaining 73 N class locomotives. Despite being a similar design, the larger and heavier N class was almost entirely scrapped, with the only survivors being the Newport-built N 432 and one NBR-built example sold to the South Australian Railways.

By the time VR announced the cessation of steam locomotive scrapping in 1978, no fewer than 21 of an original 53 K class locomotives remained in existence, making them in preservation the most numerous class of VR steam locomotives. However, none of the original batch of ten locomotives survives.

Note the following list follows traditional practice, with locomotives identified by the at-construction frame number, regardless of numbers worn at any other time or parts swapped.

=== Operational ===
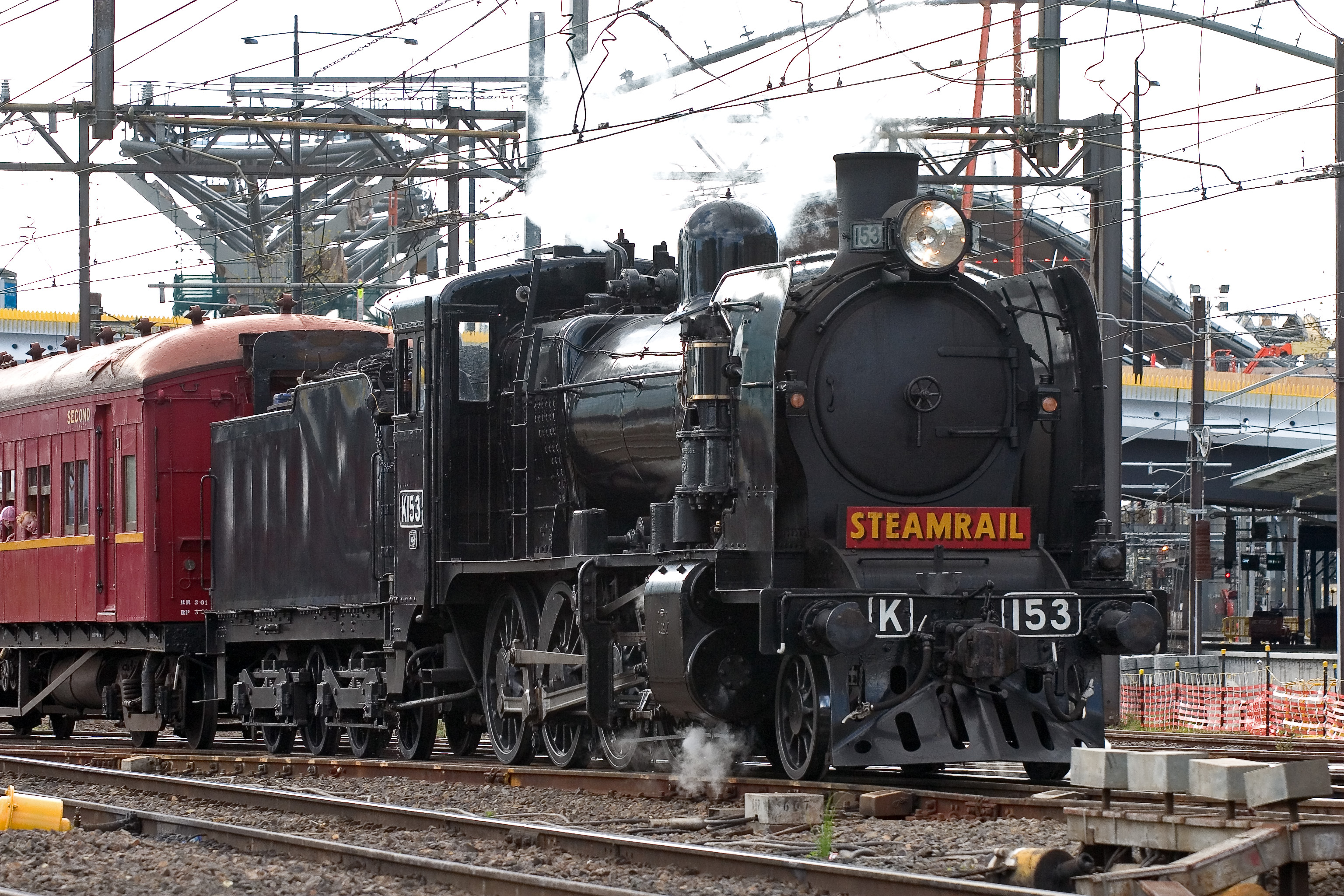
Victorian Railways K153 running around Melbourne, Victoria - September 2004 - 04

- K 153: Owned by VicTrack and managed by Steamrail Victoria. When in Melbourne, it is regularly used on suburban shuttles and on day tours to Geelong and similar-length trips. Throughout its preservation career (starting from 1974), the engine has been painted all-over black with some details picked out in white or yellow (such as handrails and the staff exchanger horn, welded in the raised position). In 2022 for the 100th anniversary of the K class the loco was cosmetically altered to represent K100, the class leader of the First Series. Later it was updated to K140 with changes to reflect later design improvements made to the class. As of 21 April, the locomotive has returned to its original number since 2021.

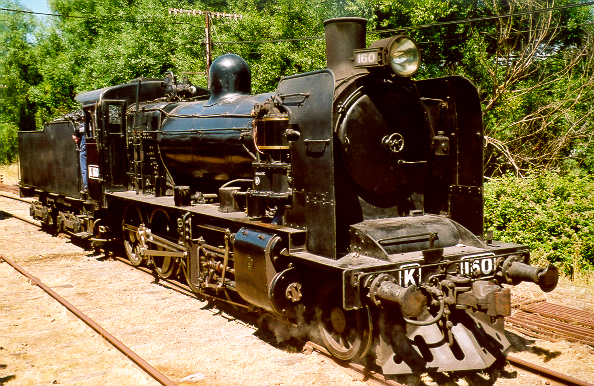
Preserved K 160 in operation on the Victorian Goldfields Railway, 19 December 2004

- K 160: Owned by the Victorian Goldfields Railway in Maldon. After being in service for 26 years, from 1986 to 2012, the engine was finally worn out and had to be transferred to Newport Workshops for a major overhaul. While in service it had always been painted a simple matte black. On February 28, 2026, K160 moved under its own steam for the first time since 2012 following its overhaul. On the 22nd of August, 2026, K160 was returned to Castlemaine via the mainline along with K183 on the Maldon Vintage Train. The locomotive has resumed running revenue services with the Victorian Goldfields Railway.

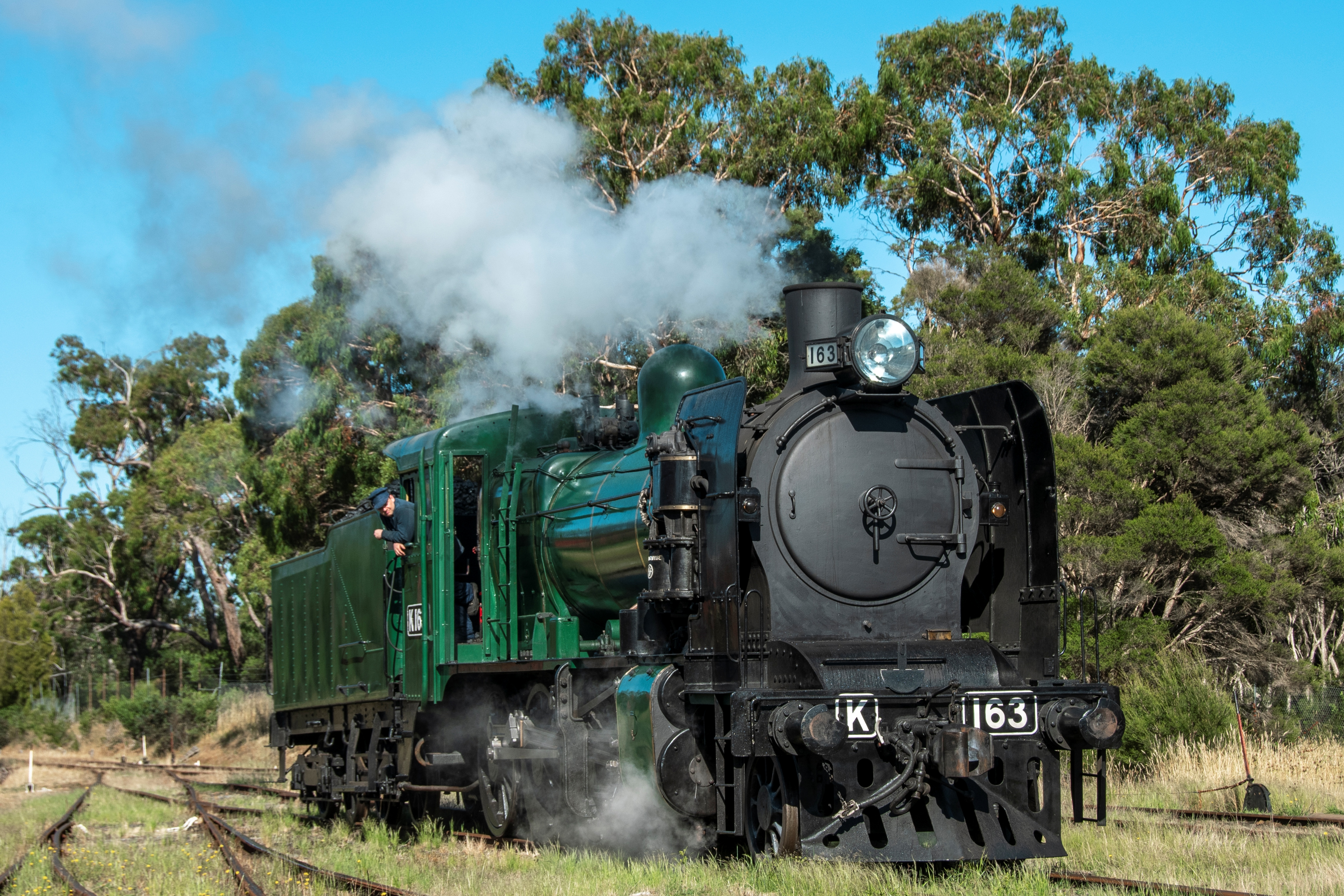
K163 Shunting at Moorooduc

- K 163: In regular service on the preserved Mornington Railway, hauling passenger services between Moorooduc and Mornington. The engine had been withdrawn from Government service in December 1968, at Ararat. It then sat idle for a few years, before being sold to the Frankston Apex Club in November 1973, and placed in the Frankston Jubilee Park. Within a few months it had been painted teal green above the frames. In 1984, the engine was sold to the Mornington Railway Preservation Society, and a boiler certificate was granted in July 1985. In November that year, the engine was moved to the Cresco sidings at Hastings for restoration, and moved under its own power for the first time ten months later. Fully restored in May 1987, and painted in a bright green scheme, with a similar layout similar to that of K190 at the time. By 1995 the engine had been repainted to a much darker green, with red lining and black smokebox and smoke deflectors, and as of 2004, the engine had gold boiler bands. The engine was under overhaul from 7 February to 21 November 2010, then it re-entered service, in the same livery but with the red changed to the same dark green, and regularly running without smoke deflectors. This overhaul utilised the boiler from K 191. The engine was used as the locomotive on train scene in part 3 of The Pacific. In 2020, K163 was transferred to Steamrail Victoria's Newport Workshops depot for a visit to the wheel lathe at Downer Newport and repairs to the crankpins.

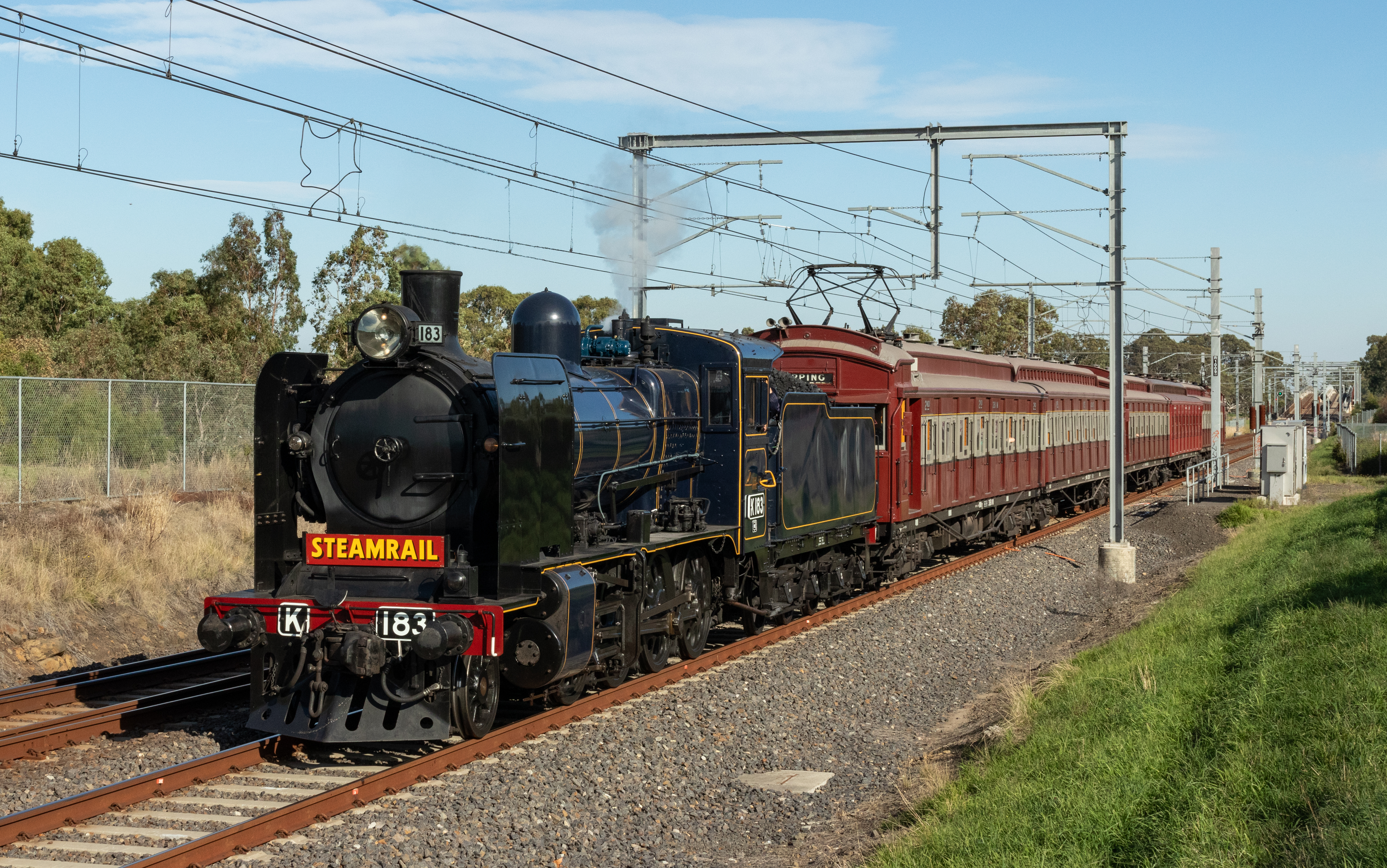
Victorian Railways K183 - Mernda - April 2024

- K 183: Before its initial restoration, the engine had been plinthed at Yarragon following withdrawal from the Victorian Railways; the Shire of Narracan had selected that engine specifically, believing it to have spent a majority of its life in the region though it is not clear if this is actually correct. In 1982 the engine unit was swapped for K 162, though the tender units remained at Yarragon and Newport respectively. In 1992, K 183 re-entered service under Steamrail, with the tender formerly attached to K 162, and in a dark blue with yellow lining livery. The loco was in service with Steamrail Victoria until 13 October 2002, when it was involved in a serious level crossing accident with a B-double semi-trailer near Benalla, Victoria, derailing after impact. Tragically, three people on the footplate died in the collision. The locomotive was extensively damaged and was stored out of service in East Block at Newport Workshops until 30 June 2020 when it was moved to Steamrail's depot at West Block. After an assessment on the condition of the engine, Steamrail have decided to restore the locomotive to mainline operating standard. K 183 was successfully repaired to running condition in October 2021, running its first mainline test in 19 years with S313 between Newport and Sunshine 7 October 2021. The engine returned to mainline passenger service in 2022.

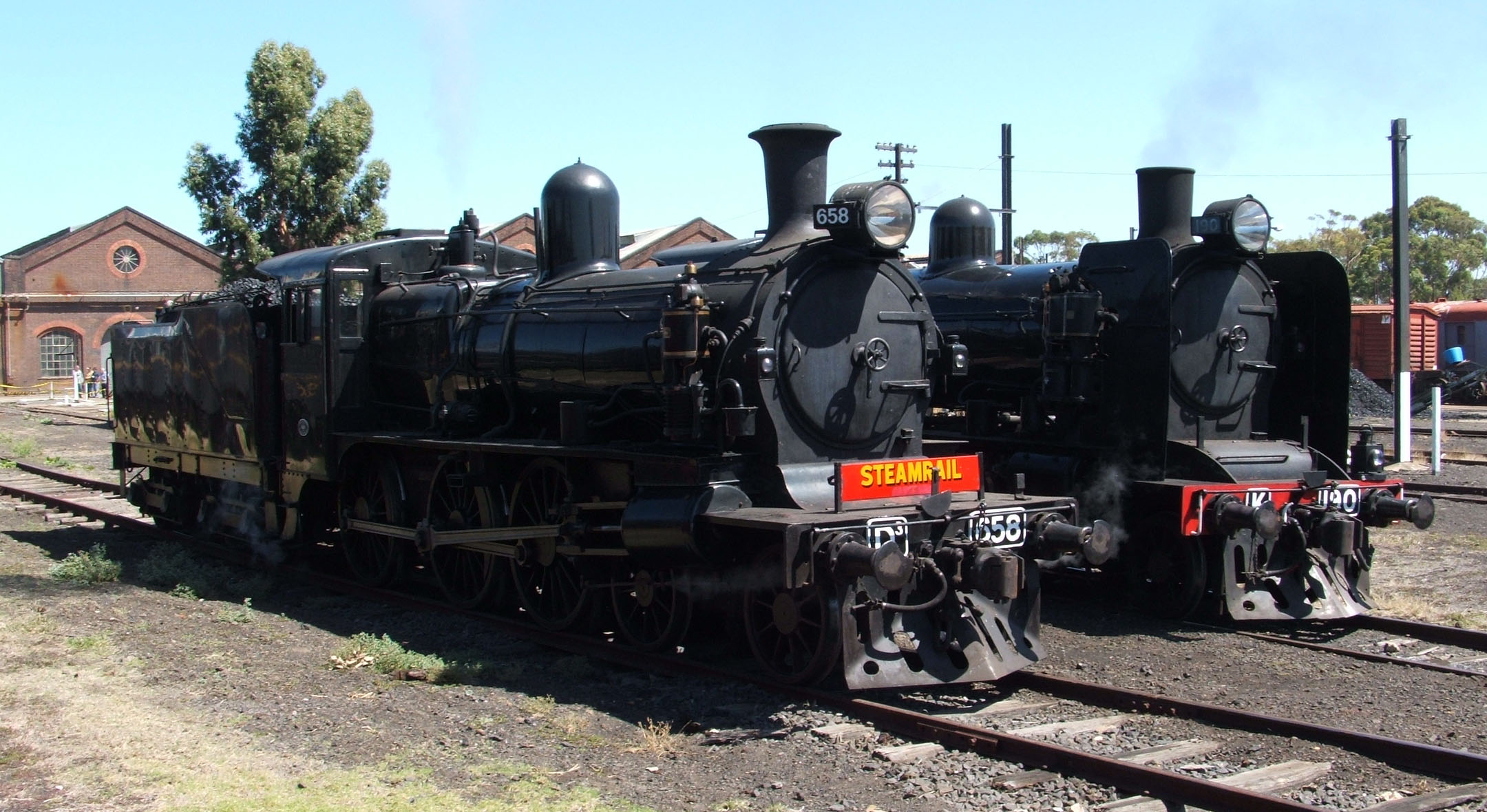
K 190 (at right) and a D3 class 4-6-0, 10 March 2007. The D3 class was a highly successful rebuild of the original Dd class from 1902, using a boiler design based on that of the K class.

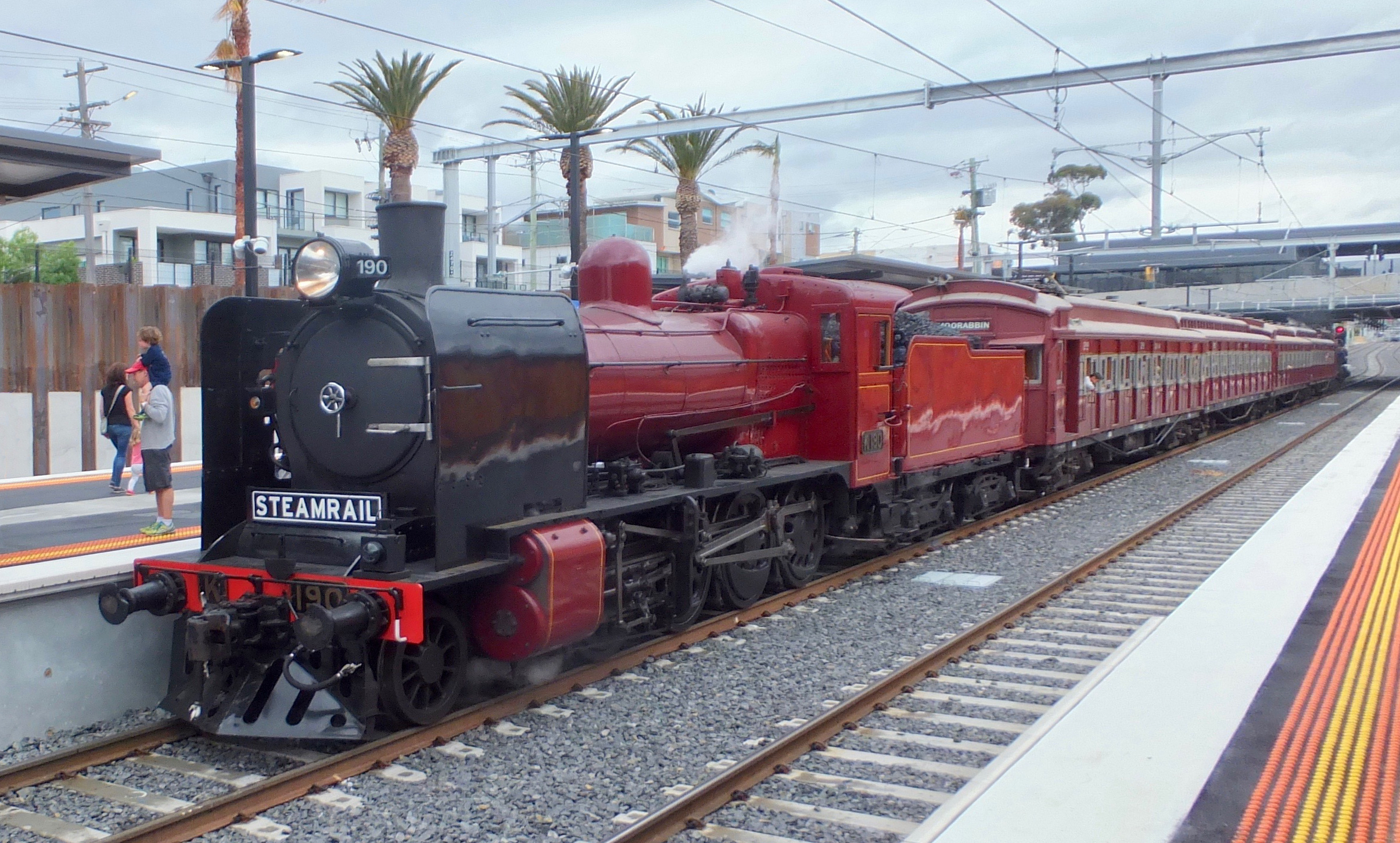
K190 at McKinnon station, November 2016

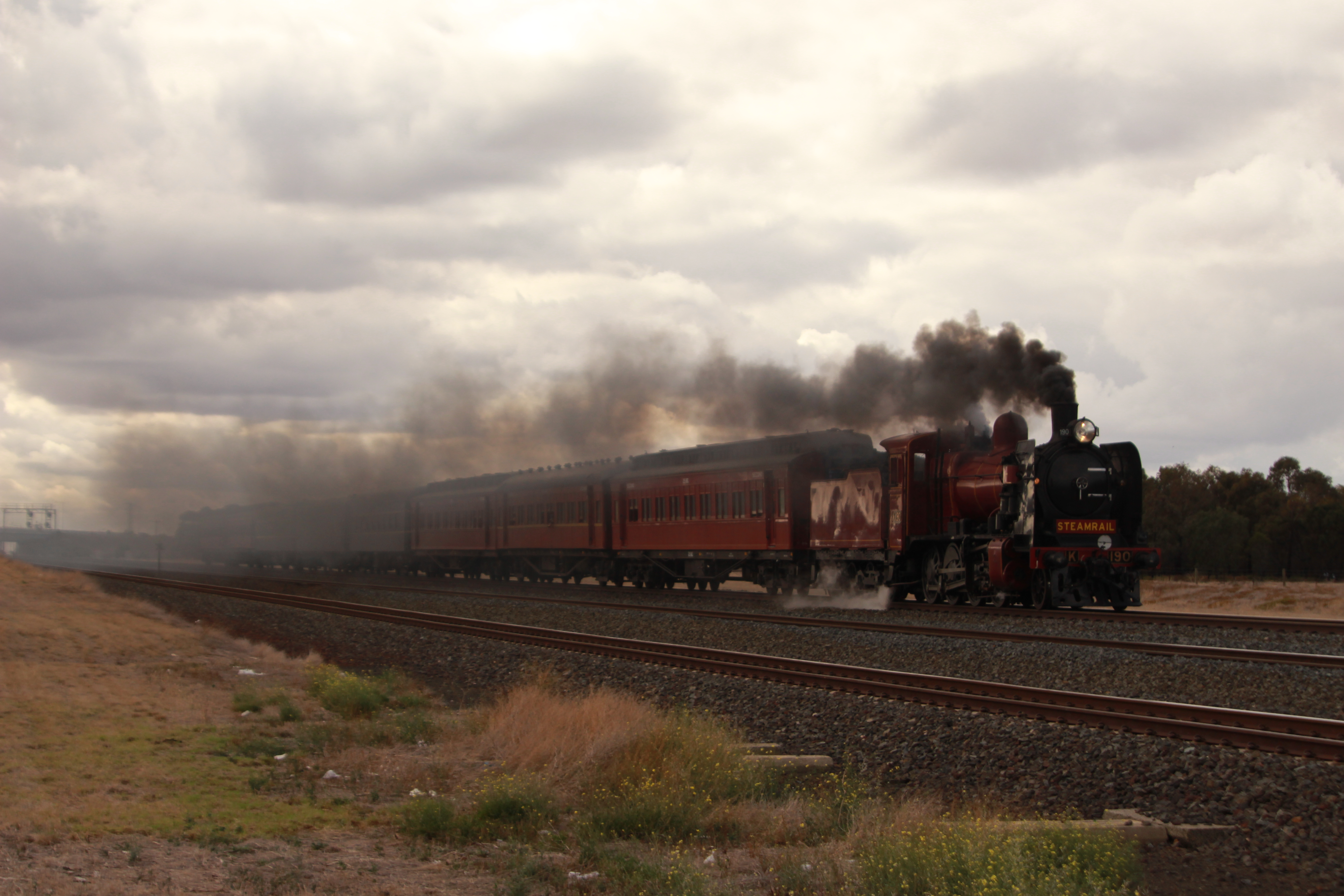
K190 on the Rail and Sail at Corio, May 2019

- K 190: Owned by VicTrack and operated by Steamrail Victoria, it is regularly used on suburban shuttles and on day tours to Geelong and similar-length trips. When first restored in 1977 at Bayswater and Newport, the engine was painted in a two-tone green livery using Dulux Verdant Green for the main body, British Paints Emerald Green for the wheels and borders, Sign Writer gold (lemon tint) for the lining; Dulux black enamel for the frames, tender bogies and smoke deflectors, Dulux bright red for the front and rear buffer beams, Dulux Cumberland Stone for the cab interior and Bituminious Black for the smokebox. This lasted until 1992, after which the engine was returned to a plain black livery. In 1995, she was leased to the South Gippsland railway, and that organisation gave a simpler version of the green livery, using apple green on the boiler, cab, tender and cylinders (with limited dark green lining), red buffer beams both ends, and matt black frames and wheels. By 4 November 2000 the engine had returned to Steamrail in Melbourne, and been repainted gloss black; by Easter of 2001 the front buffer beam had been repainted red. The engine spent some time around 2010 on the Victorian Goldfields Railway. On Saturday 12 March 2016, the engine was restored to service in a new crimson with yellow, black and red livery, along the same lines as the R 766's previous livery. Both were inspired by the London, Midland and Scottish Railway's crimson lake livery.

=== Under restoration ===
- K 174: Moorooduc, with the Mornington Railway. This engine had been plinthed at the Edinburgh Gardens in Fitzroy (near the former Fitzroy Railway Station) until 18 May 1997, when it was acquired by the Mornington Railway Preservation Society and transferred to Moorooduc by road. The engine was in generally terrible condition, with most fittings missing and the remainder of parts damaged, except the engine frames which were in surprisingly good condition by comparison. The tender tank had fittings removed and was scrapped at Moorooduc, being beyond repair, and the tender frame and the brake gear for the locomotive demonstrated significant collision damage. The rest of the parts were placed in a pool to be used to reassemble a future engine; at the end of the project, the pool consisted of the boiler, smokebox, funnel and pony truck from 159 and 177; the loco frames, coupled wheels, axle boxes, motion gear and smoke deflectors from 159 and 174; the tender frame and bogies from 174 and 177, and the tender tank from 177 only. In 2000, the coupled wheels and motion gear from 174 was swapped with that from 176 at Seymour as the tyres from 174 required replacement, while 176's tyres were almost new; though both locomotives had poor condition axle boxes and crankpins. A few years later, the tender bogies from 174 were swapped with those from 191. When completed, the locomotive using K 174's frame is to be numbered K 177 and named City of Ararat, as part of the deal for parts acquisition.
- K 191: Moorooduc, with the Mornington Railway. Previously on static display in Wangaratta, Victoria, was purchased by the Mornington Railway in 2001 and moved by low-loader to Moorooduc for restoration. It has been stripped down into its component parts for inspection and preliminary work as a restoration project by the Mornington Railway Preservation Society. The engine also had the tender bogies ex K 174 allocated. In 2010, the restoration of K 163 claimed K 191's boiler.

=== Static display ===
K 165 is preserved at the Newport Railway Museum, painted in traditional all-over black.

In addition, K class locomotives are also preserved on public display at various locations:

- K 154: Was previously on display in the "Old Moe Town" Historical Park. This locomotive is now the focus of the N441 - Steam Locomotive Project to convert the locomotive into a 1st series N class 2-8-2 by the Locomotive Restoration Group based at Newport Workshops. In early 2016, the project was shifted from Newport to Traralgon but the locomotive remains stored at Newport Workshops. On 28 January 2023 the frame of K 154 was moved from Newport to Traralgon for the rest of the work to be completed there.
- K 162: Yarragon, Victoria (numbered 'K-183': the two locomotives were swapped in 1982 when K 183 commenced restoration to working order, although K 183's tender remains.)
- K 167: Wycheproof, Victoria, painted black with red lining.
- K 169: Coal Creek Community Park and Museum, Korumburra, Victoria. Painted black with red running board.
- K 175: Mildura, Victoria; in a rather colourful green/red/black scheme applied by the local council after being placed on its plinth sometime between 1972 and 1975. This engine is fitted with spoked wheels, except for the main driving axle (third from front) which is fitted with boxpok wheels.
- K 177: Hamilton, Victoria. Following withdrawal from service, this locomotive was sold to the Langhi Morgala Museum in Ararat and placed on display. It was subsequently acquired by the Mornington Railway Preservation Society and transferred to Moorooduc. Further inspection revealed a number of parts beyond restoration, so a complex deal was worked out with other organisations over the late 1990s. The end result was that the frame of K 177 was placed at Hamilton, Victoria, along with its own coupled wheels, motion gear and smoke deflectors. K 159 donated the tender body, frame and bogies, and K 174 provided the boiler, smokebox, funnel and pony truck. The engine is currently un-numbered, but during the transition process it was alternately known as the Hamilton Exchange Locomotive or K 193.
- K 181: Numurkah, Victoria All-over black with red running board and handrails. Displayed alongside a replica station, with the verandah used to provide shelter and to help protect the locomotive from weathering.
- K 192: State Coal Mine, Wonthaggi, Victoria Painted all-over black with red lining under the locomotive running board, but with black buffer beam. For a time, the engine wore the identity of K 170.

=== Stored ===
- K 151: Steamrail Newport, locomotive only, at Steamrail's Newport Workshops depot, owned by VicTrack. Used as a supply of spare parts to keep other engines in service.
- K 157: Maldon, with the Victorian Goldfields Railway. Used as a supply of spare parts to keep K 160 in service.
- K 159: Moorooduc, with the Mornington Railway. Was plinthed at Hamilton in Western Victoria until that council was approached by the Mornington railway, looking to swap around a series of locomotive parts in order to restore more engines. In 1997 the engine was transferred to Moorooduc; however the Hamilton City Council wanted to retain a K class locomotive for display purposes, so the remaining parts from the Mornington swap were reassembled and delivered back to Hamilton in 1998. The true K 159 engine unit is currently used as a supply of spare parts to keep other engines in service, with a long-term intent to restore to operational condition. However, because K 174's tender tank was beyond restoration, this engine at Moorooduc has no tender tank attached to the tender frame. The current list of parts ex 159, 174 and 177 at Moorooduc is listed in the K 174 entry above.
- K 176: Seymour, with the Seymour Rail Heritage Centre. Generally used as a supply of parts for other organisations, to keep their locomotives in service. Taken off the register on 6 September 1972; transported from Bendigo to Deniliquin on 31 November 1972 for preservation, being plinthed on the Deniliquin turntable. Driving wheels and associated motion was provided to the Mornington railway following the parts swap project between K 159, K 174, K 177. The locomotive now sits on the driving wheels previously from K 174 at Fitzroy, having been swapped over during a single weekend in 2000. Since then the engine has been sitting outside in the Seymour Rail Heritage Centre.
- K 184: Steamrail Newport, locomotive only, owned by VicTrack. Was used on heritage services with Steamrail Victoria through the 1970s, painted all over gloss black with red frames and buffer beams. The engine was withdrawn in 1980 awaiting restoration due to its mechanical condition. Other Steamrail K class locomotives occasionally wear its number plates and headlight number boards.
- W 843: K class tender, at Steamrail's Newport Workshops depot, owned by VicTrack. Possibly was previously with K 184.
- W 859: K class tender, at Steamrail's Newport Workshops depot, owned by VicTrack. Previously with K 153 but was replaced with a newly constructed tender tank with the frame most likely from K 162 or another K class.
