= Metropolitan Missionary Baptist Church =

Historic church in Illinois, United States

- U.S. National Register of Historic Places
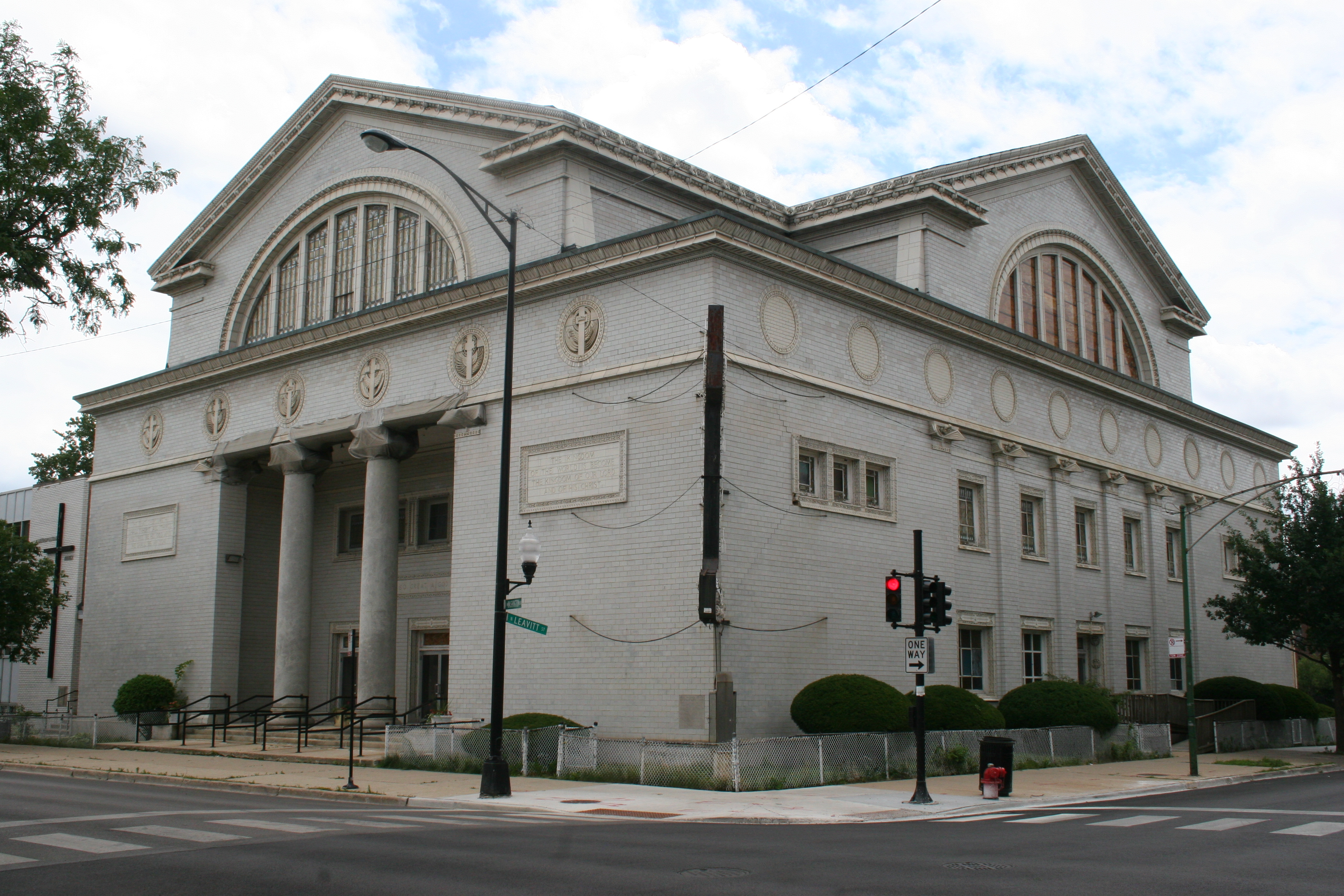

- Location within Illinois
- Location: 2151 W. Washington Boulevard, Chicago, Illinois
- Coordinates: 41.88302°N 87.68129°W
- Built: 1901
- NRHP reference No.: 16000733
- Added to NRHP: October 24, 2016

Metropolitan Missionary Baptist Church, originally named the Third Church of Christ, Scientist, is a landmark church located on West Washington Boulevard in Chicago, Illinois, United States. The church was designed by architect Hugh M. G. Garden and was built in 1901. The church was sold to its current owners in 1947. It was designated a Chicago Landmark on February 16, 1989, and was listed on the National Register of Historic Places in 2016.

== See also ==
- National Register of Historic Places listings in West Side Chicago
