= St. Matthew Evangelical Lutheran School =

- U.S. National Register of Historic Places
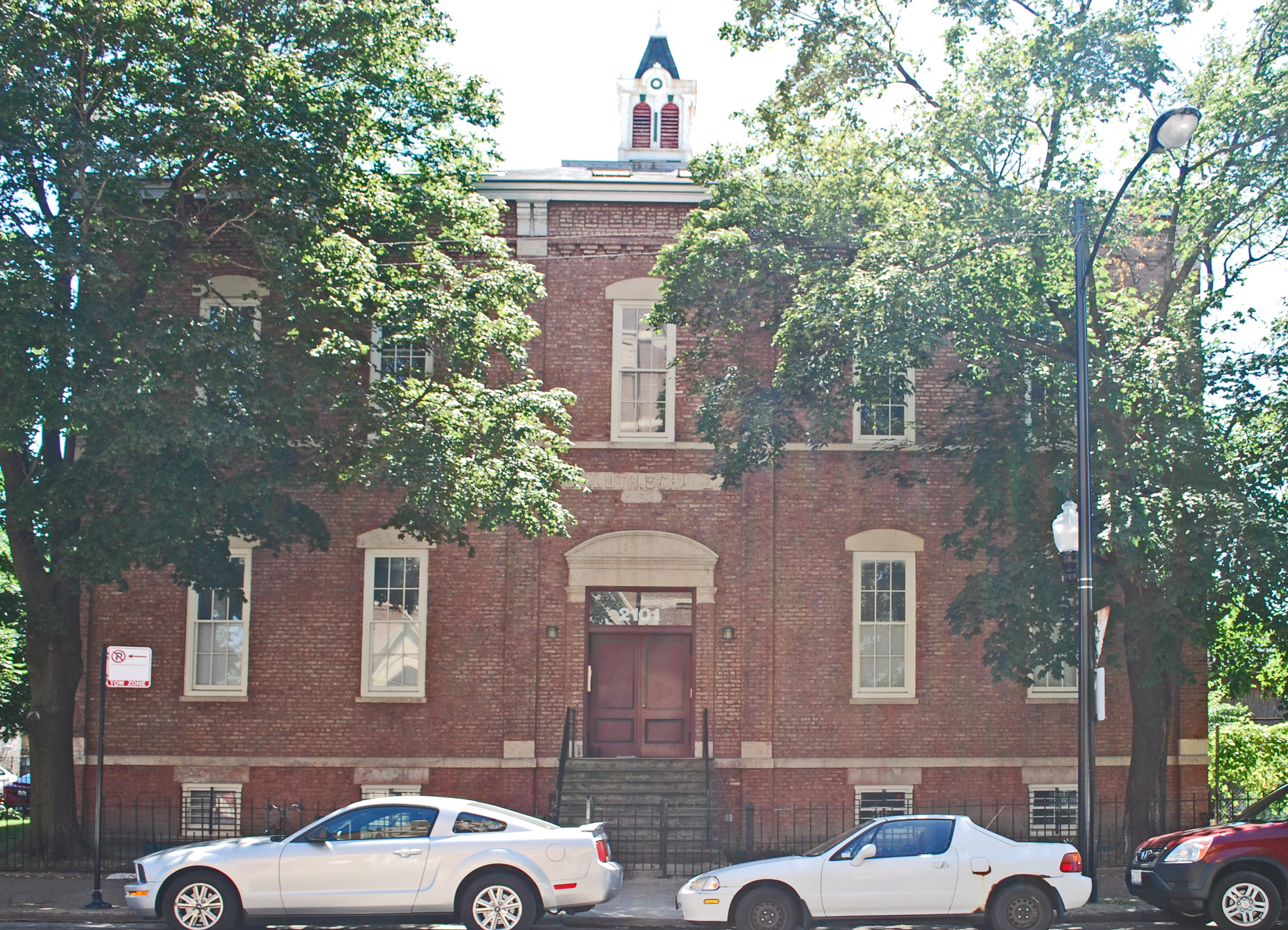

- Location within Chicago metropolitan area Location within Illinois Location within the United States
- Location: 2101-2107 W. 21st St., Chicago, Illinois
- Coordinates: 41°51′13″N 87°40′43″W
- Area: less than one acre
- Built: 1882
- Architectural style: Italianate
- NRHP reference No.: 99001710
- Added to NRHP: January 27, 2000

St. Matthew Evangelical Lutheran School is a historic Lutheran school building located at 2101-2107 W. 21st Street in Chicago, Illinois. Built in 1882, it is one of the only surviving Italianate school buildings in Chicago. While the Italianate style was popular in Chicago in the second half of the 19th century, it was mainly used in homes and commercial buildings rather than institutional buildings, making the school's design uncommon even for its era. The school's distinctive Italianate features include its tall windows with arched lintels, its symmetrical front facade, its double bracketed cornice, and the cupola atop its roof. The school is also one of the oldest remaining school buildings in the Lower West Side and its adjacent community areas; only four older schools remain within these nine community areas, and St. Ignatius College Prep is the only older parochial school.

The building was added to the National Register of Historic Places on January 27, 2000.
