= Otis Elevator Company Building (Portland, Oregon) =

Historic building in Portland, Oregon, U.S.

- U.S. National Register of Historic Places
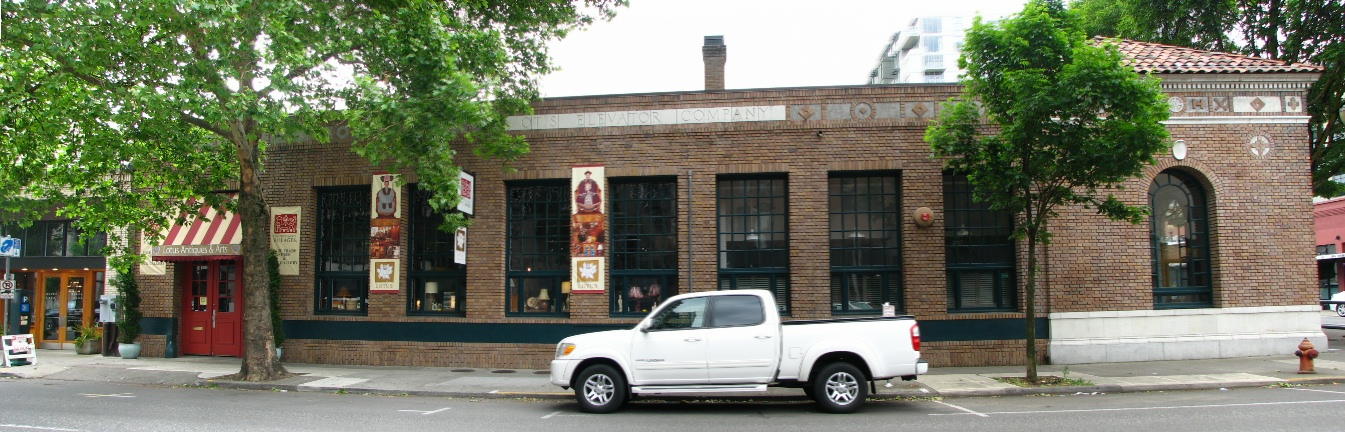
- Otis Elevator Company Building in 2009

- Location within Portland, Oregon Location within Oregon Location within the United States
- Location: 230 NW 10th Ave, Portland, Oregon
- Coordinates: 45°31′30″N 122°40′47″W
- Built: 1920
- Architect: Otis Elevator Co.
- Architectural style: Late 19th and 20th Century Revivals, Italian Renaissance
- NRHP reference No.: 88000095
- Added to NRHP: February 11, 1988

The Otis Elevator Company Building is a commercial building located in northwest Portland, Oregon listed on the National Register of Historic Places.

The single-story building became the Otis Elevator Company's Portland headquarters in 1920, and was used for offices, servicing and parts storage. It remained in use by the Otis company until 1975.

== See also ==
- National Register of Historic Places listings in Northwest Portland, Oregon
