= Stone Temple Baptist Church =

Church in Chicago, Illinois, United States

Coordinates: 41.8632°N 87.7163°W

Stone Temple Baptist Church is an historic congregation located at 3622 W. Douglas Blvd. in Chicago, Illinois. Founded by Rev. James Marcellus Stone, the church was a well-known location for in the 1950s and 60s due to its multiple occasions in which the Rev. Dr. Martin Luther King Jr. preached to the congregation during his civil rights efforts in Chicago during the Chicago Freedom Movement.

The church building was originally constructed as a synagogue in 1926, by Joseph W. Cohen & Company Architects, for Jewish immigrants from Romania. It was sold to Rev. Stone in 1954 and soon was turned into its current name.

The building was approved as an official City of Chicago landmark by the City Council on June 22, 2016, and later, on December 21, 2022, Stone Temple Baptist Church was listed on the National Register of Historical Places.
