= Creamery Package Manufacturing Company Building =

- U.S. National Register of Historic Places
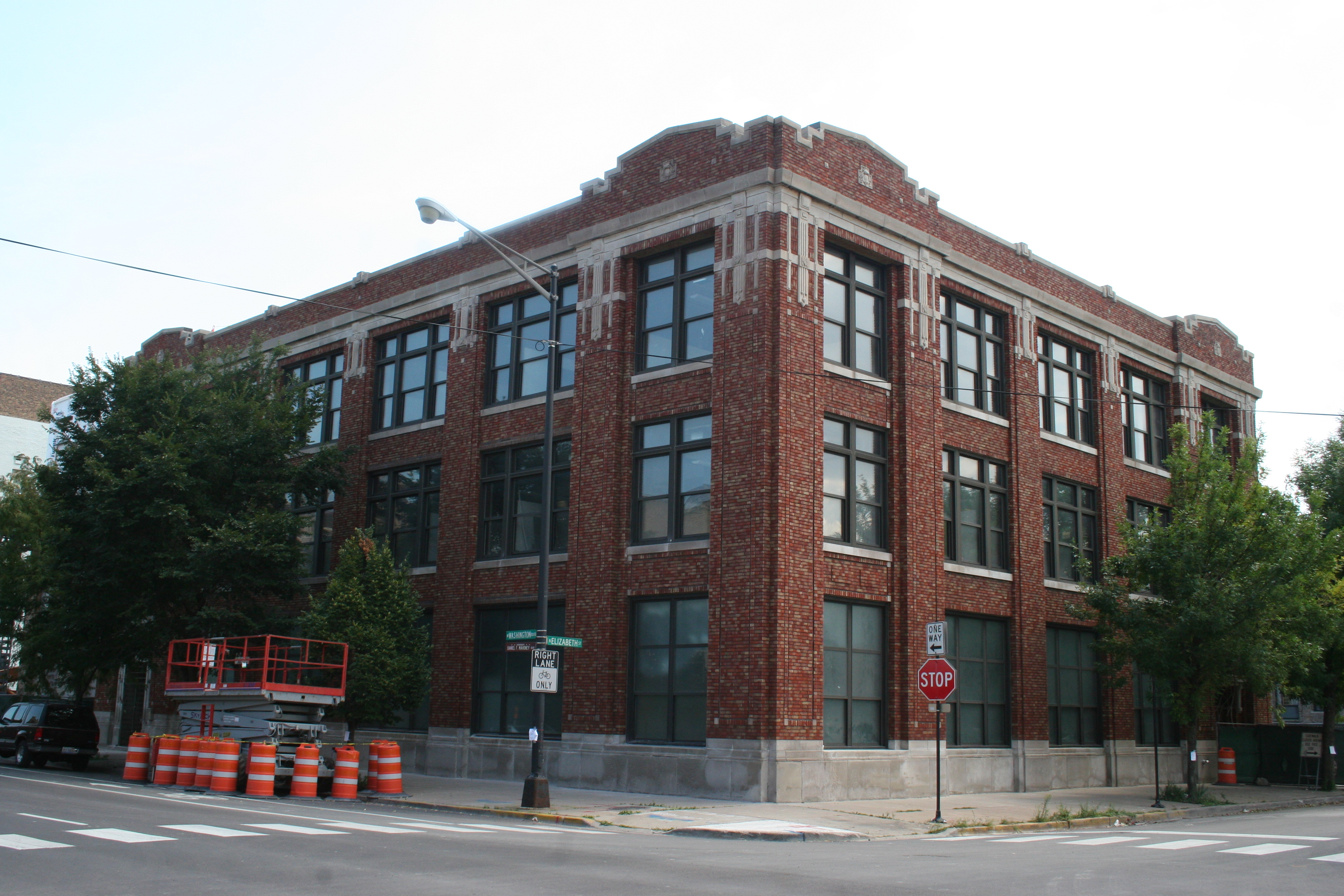

- Location within Chicago metropolitan area Location within Illinois Location within the United States
- Location: 1245 W. Washington Blvd., Chicago, Illinois
- Coordinates: 41°52′58″N 87°39′30″W
- Area: less than one acre
- Built: 1926
- Built by: R. C. Wieboldt Company
- Architect: Gardner & Lindberg
- Architectural style: Colonial Revival
- NRHP reference No.: 11000778
- Added to NRHP: November 8, 2011

The Creamery Package Manufacturing Company Building is a historic building at 1245 W. Washington Boulevard in the Near West Side neighborhood of Chicago, Illinois. Built in 1926, the building served as the headquarters for the Creamery Package Manufacturing Company, which was formed in 1887. The architecture firm of Gardner & Lindberg designed the three-story Colonial Revival building. The Creamery Package Manufacturing Company produced processing equipment and other goods for the dairy industry, which had a large presence in and around Chicago in the early 20th century. The company is representative of Chicago's significant food processing industry; the city's position as a transportation hub meant processing companies could quickly send their goods to larger customers in the food industry. The Creamery Package Manufacturing Company used the building until the 1970s.

The building was added to the National Register of Historic Places on November 8, 2011.
