= Anton Cermak House =

Historic house in Illinois, United States

- U.S. National Register of Historic Places
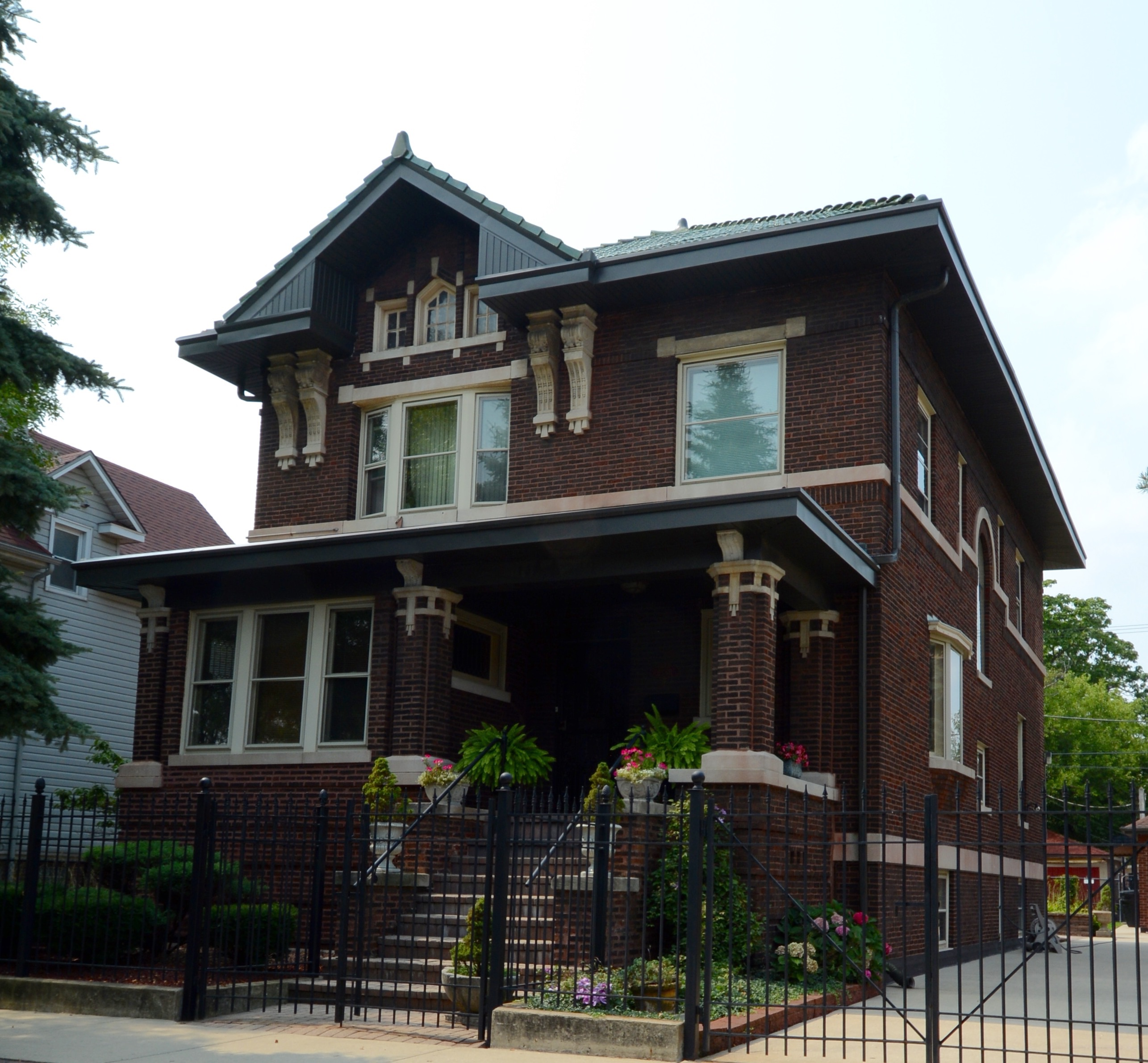

- Location within Chicago metropolitan area Location within Illinois Location within the United States
- Location: 2348 S. Millard Ave., Chicago, Illinois
- Coordinates: 41°50′54″N 87°42′59″W
- Area: less than one acre
- Built: 1912
- Built by: Rezny, James B
- Architect: Randak, Frank A.
- Architectural style: Foursquare
- NRHP reference No.: 10001201
- Added to NRHP: February 4, 2011

The Anton Cermak House, located at 2348 S. Millard Avenue in Chicago's South Lawndale neighborhood, was the home of former Chicago mayor Anton Cermak. Frank A. Randak designed the American Foursquare house, which was built in 1902. Cermak moved to the house in 1923 and accomplished much of his political legacy while living there. He had become president of the Cook County Board of Commissioners a year prior, and he became chairman of the Cook County Democratic Party in 1928; he used this position to establish the foundations of Chicago's Democratic political machine. A native of Bohemia, Cermak became Chicago's first foreign-born mayor in 1931. After Cermak was assassinated in 1933, his daughter Helen became the house's owner.

The house was added to the National Register of Historic Places on February 4, 2011.
