= Lindemann and Hoverson Company Showroom and Warehouse =

- U.S. National Register of Historic Places
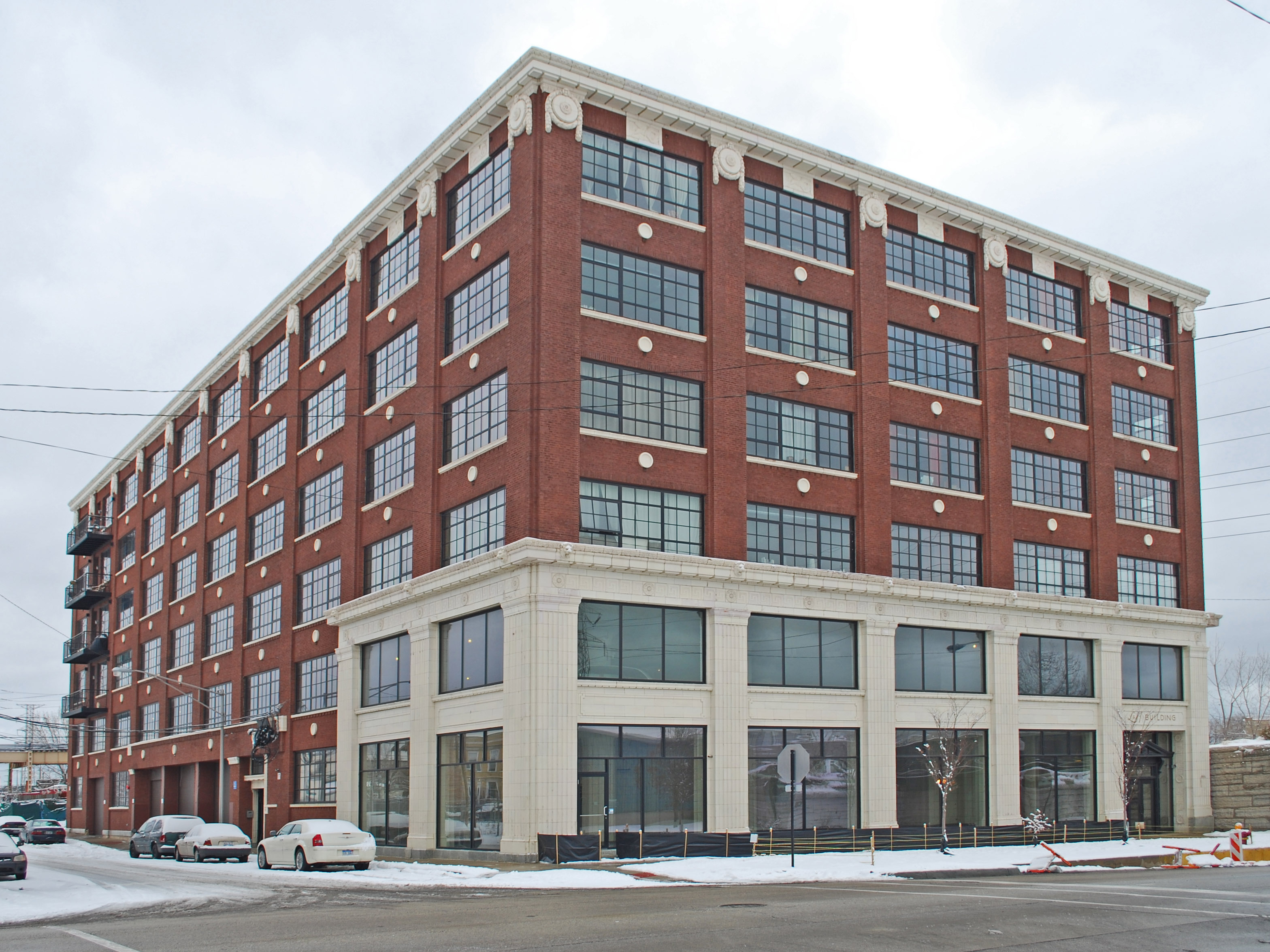

- Location within Chicago metropolitan area Location within Illinois Location within the United States
- Location: 2620 W. Washington Blvd., Chicago, Illinois
- Coordinates: 41°52′59″N 87°41′31″W
- Area: less than one acre
- Built: 1924
- Architect: Paul Gerhardt, Sr.
- NRHP reference No.: 08001095
- Added to NRHP: November 26, 2008

The Lindemann and Hoverson Company Showroom and Warehouse is a historic industrial building at 2620 W. Washington Boulevard in the East Garfield Park neighborhood of Chicago, Illinois. The Lindemann and Hoverson Company, which manufactured heaters, stoves, and electric kitchen tools, built the building in 1924. Architect Paul Gerhardt, Sr., designed the industrial loft; while such buildings were often plain structures, his design is more formal and includes ornamentation. The building's showroom section, which encompasses the first two floors on the west side, is clad with a terra cotta section which features pilasters and a frieze. The remainder of the building has a brick exterior, though it includes terra cotta medallions and a cornice. Lindemann and Hoverson occupied the building until 1941.

The building was added to the National Register of Historic Places on November 26, 2008.
