= Story-Camp Rowhouses =

- U.S. National Register of Historic Places
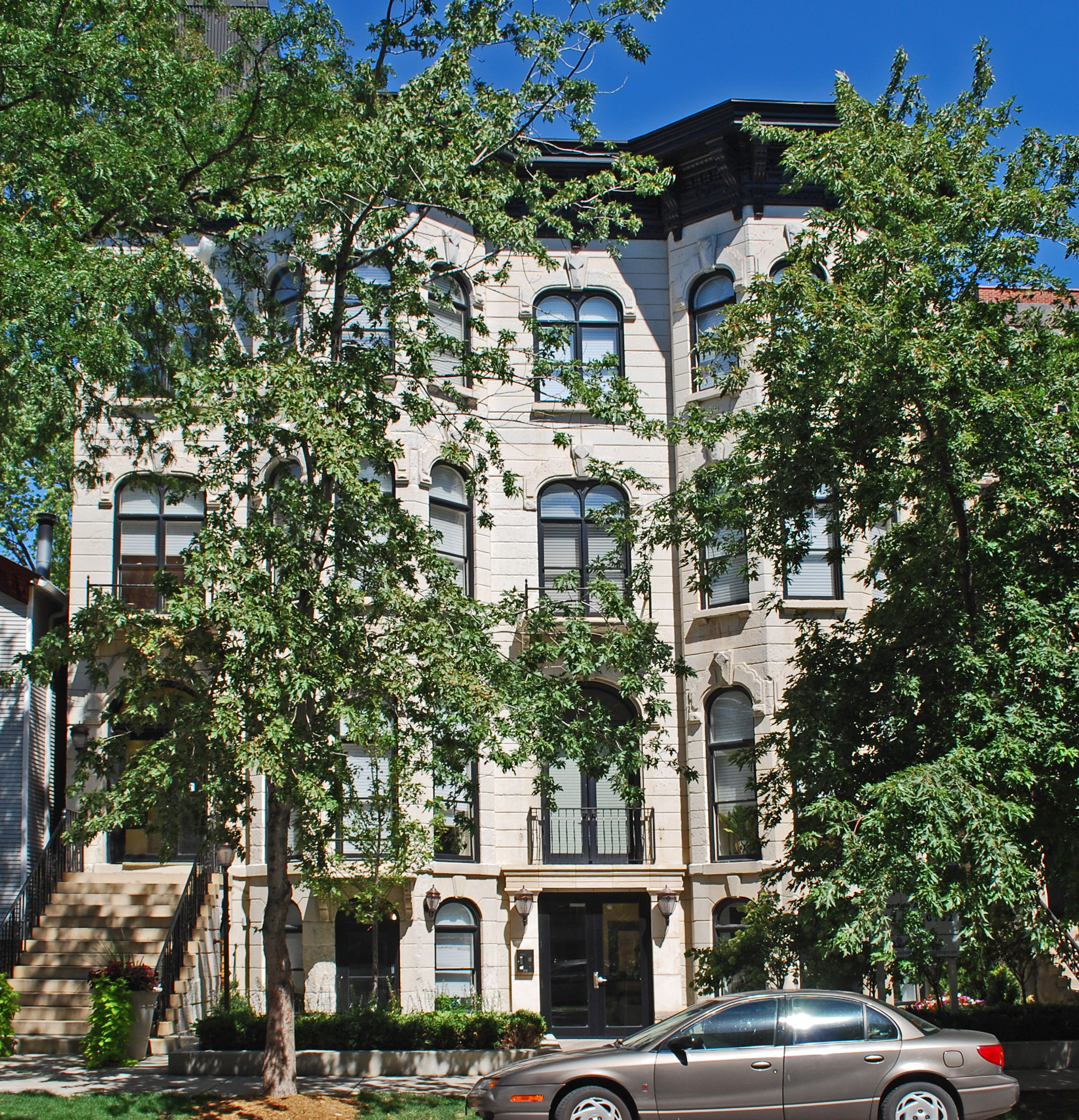

- Location within Chicago metropolitan area Location within Illinois Location within the United States
- Location: 1526-1528 W. Monroe St., Chicago, Illinois
- Coordinates: 41°52′48″N 87°39′57″W
- Area: less than one acre
- Built: 1870; 156 years ago
- Architectural style: Italianate
- NRHP reference No.: 80001351
- Added to NRHP: May 8, 1980

The Story-Camp Rowhouses are a pair of identical rowhouses located at 1526–1528 W. Monroe Street in Chicago, Illinois. The rowhouses were built in 1870 by developers Matthew and George Laflin and Allen Loomis. At the time, the neighborhood around Union Park was being developed into an attractive residential area, and the Laflins and Loomis marketed their new houses to wealthy and prominent Chicagoans. The rowhouses have an Italianate design, a popular choice for the era, which features bracketed overhanging eaves and windows with rounded hoods. The houses' first owners were Isaac and Flora Camp and Hampton and Marion Story; Isaac and Hampton owned the Story & Camp organ and piano business.

The rowhouses were added to the National Register of Historic Places on May 8, 1980.
