= Building at 900 West Lake Street =

- U.S. National Register of Historic Places
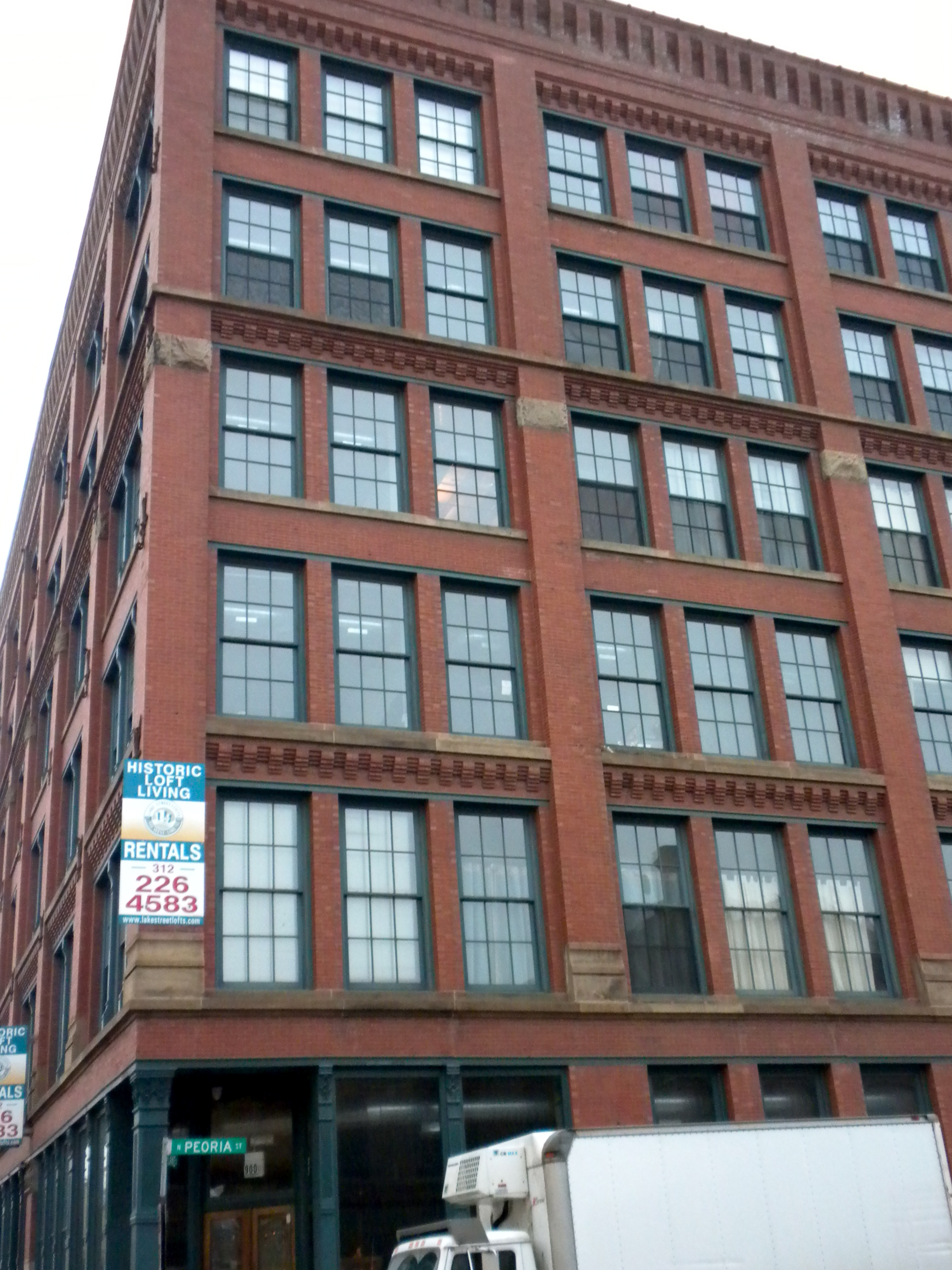
- Location: 900 W. Lake St., Chicago, Illinois
- Coordinates: 41°53′09″N 87°39′00″W
- Built: 1886
- Architectural style: Commercial
- NRHP reference No.: 99000163
- Added to NRHP: February 12, 1999

The Building at 900 West Lake Street is a historic building in the Near West Side neighborhood of Chicago, Illinois. Built in 1886, the building is an example of an industrial loft, a type of multi-story building that multiple companies could use for manufacturing and business purposes. The six-story building has a brick exterior and wooden interior columns, a typical support system for industrial lofts. The building has a commercial style exterior; like many industrial lofts, its formal architecture was meant to attract companies looking for sales and office space. Brick piers span the upper floors of the building, and brick corbelling lines the cornice and the top of the windows on even floors. The first floor features a cast iron storefront with decorative columns.

The building was added to the National Register of Historic Places on February 12, 1999.
