= J. P. Smith Shoe Company Plant =

- U.S. National Register of Historic Places
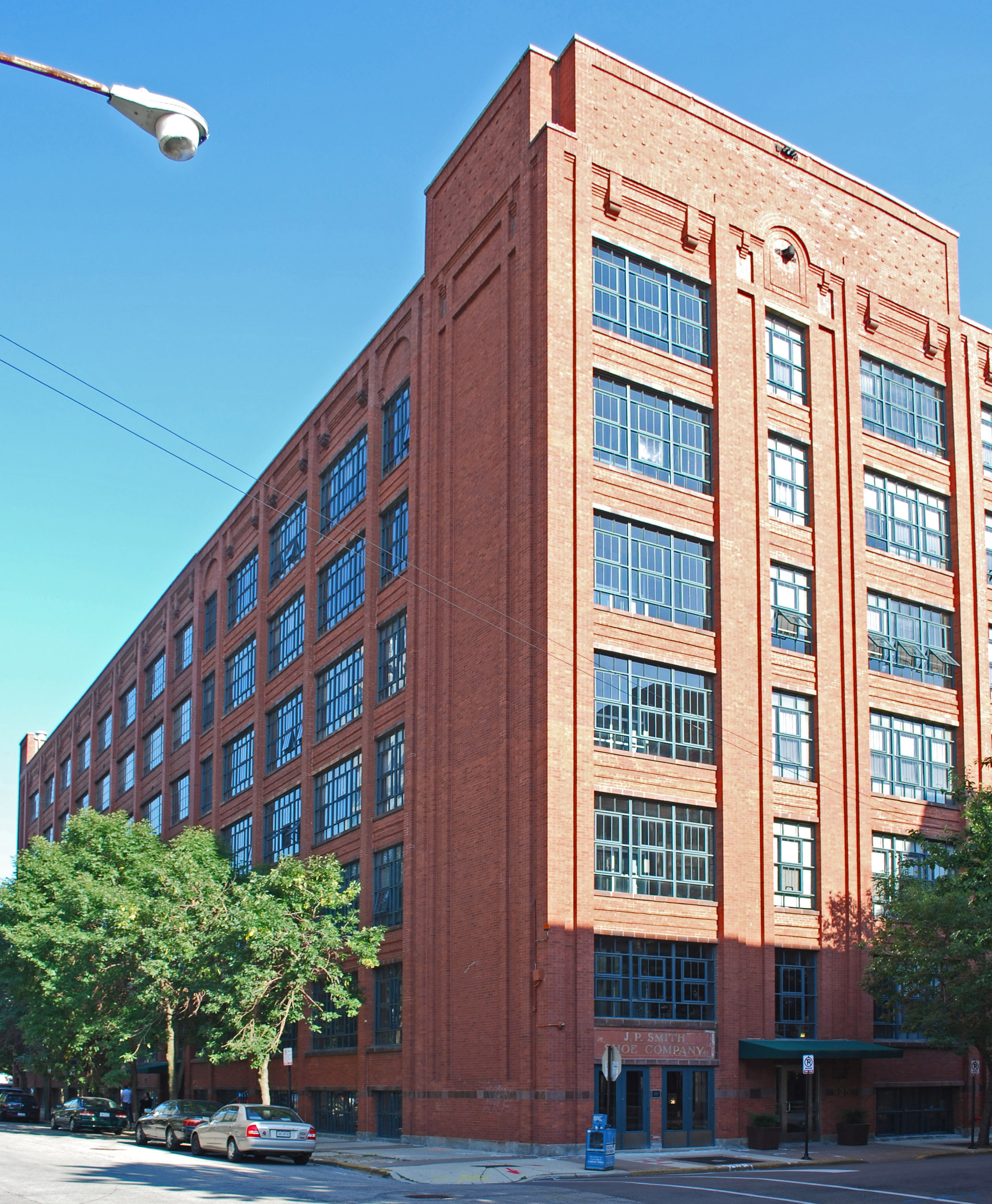

- Location within Illinois Location within the United States
- Location: 671-699 N. Sangamon Ave. and 901-921 W. Huron St., Chicago, Illinois
- Coordinates: 41°53′41″N 87°39′03″W
- Area: 1.5 acres (0.61 ha)
- Built: 1911-12
- Architect: Wilson, Horatio R.
- NRHP reference No.: 85002842
- Added to NRHP: November 14, 1985

The J. P. Smith Shoe Company Plant is a historic factory building at the corner of North Sangamon Avenue and West Huron Street in the West Town neighborhood of Chicago, Illinois. The factory was built in 1911-12 for the J. P. Smith Shoe Company, Chicago's second-largest maker of shoes at the time. Horatio R. Wilson, a prolific local architect, designed the building. Wilson's design used metal sash windows to provide light and ventilation to workers, putting it at the forefront of a national trend in industrial construction. The emphasis on proper lighting was a recurring theme in Wilson's work, as he had also designed some of Chicago's first apartments with sun parlors. The design also used brickwork to add decorative features, such as piers and a cornice, to an otherwise functional and unadorned design.

The building was added to the National Register of Historic Places on November 14, 1985.
