= Tri-Taylor Historic District =

- U.S. National Register of Historic Places
- U.S. Historic district
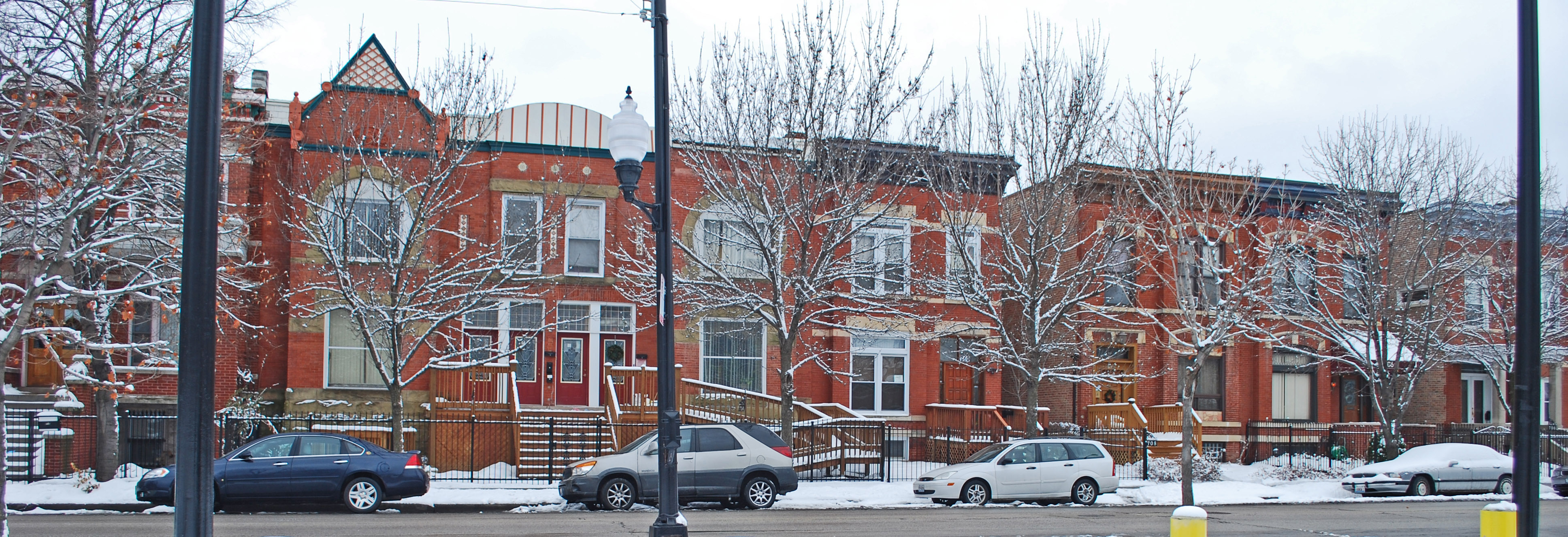

- Location within Chicago metropolitan area Location within Illinois Location within the United States
- Location: Roughly bounded by Claremont, Harrison, Oakley, Polk, Ogden, and Roosevelt Rds., Chicago, Illinois
- Coordinates: 41°52′13″N 87°41′00″W
- Area: 65 acres (26 ha)
- NRHP reference No.: 83000315
- Added to NRHP: March 3, 1983

The Tri-Taylor Historic District is a historic district in the Near West Side neighborhood of Chicago, Illinois. The district is primarily residential and includes over 400 buildings. Most of the district's buildings are rowhouses, and almost all are from the late 19th century; their designs are notable for the frequent use of applied decorative elements uncommon elsewhere in Chicago. The district developed in the wake of the Great Chicago Fire of 1871 and was mainly the home to middle-class residents relocating from immigrant neighborhoods. While the district's residents were mainly Western European, particularly German and Irish, in its first decades, the area became predominantly Italian around 1900 and remained so until it entered a decline in the 1940s and 1950s.

The district was added to the National Register of Historic Places on March 3, 1983.
