= Storkline Furniture Corporation Factory =

- U.S. National Register of Historic Places
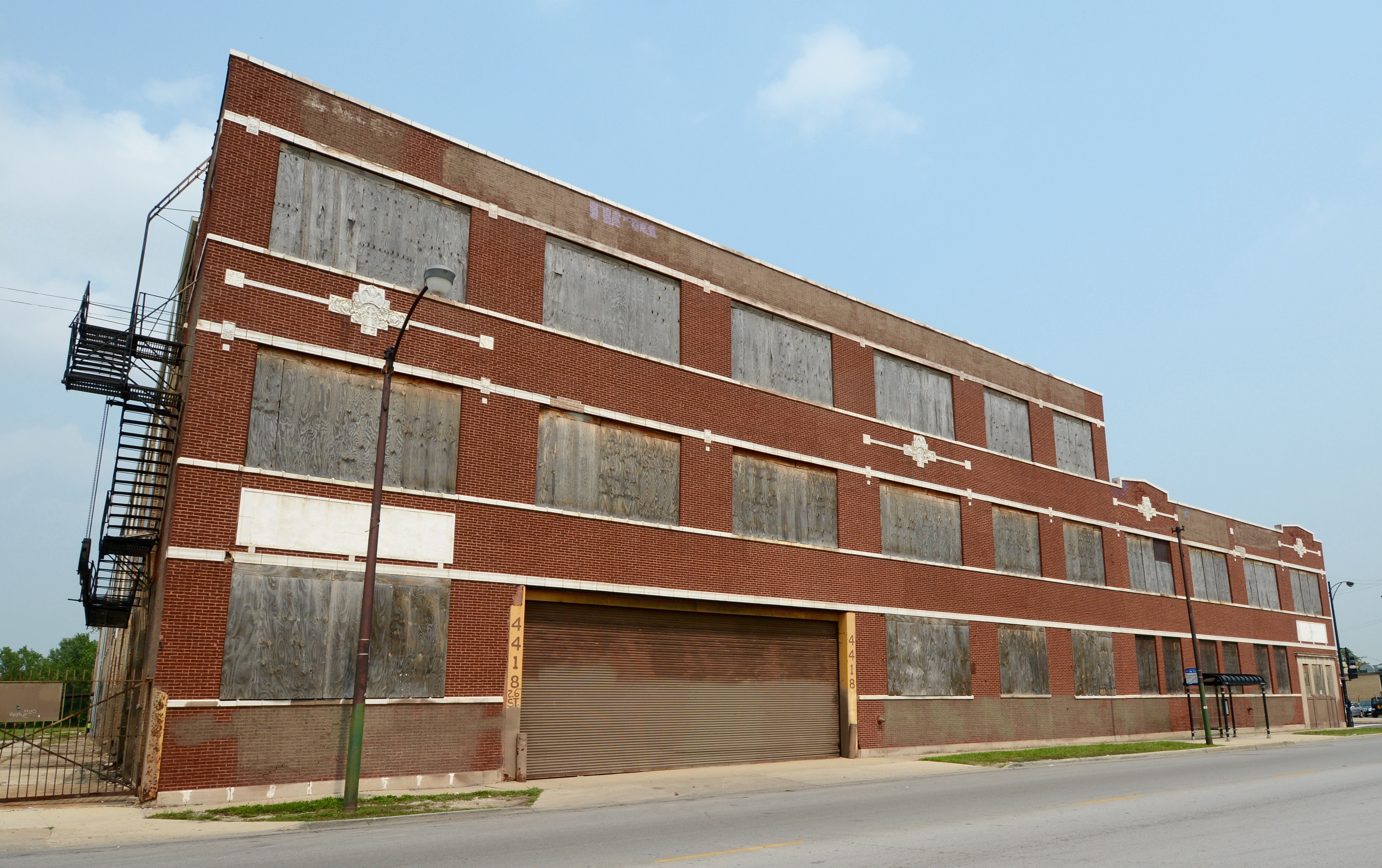

- Location within Chicago metropolitan area Location within Illinois Location within the United States
- Location: 4400-4418 W. 26th St., Chicago, Illinois
- Coordinates: 41°50′42″N 87°44′05″W
- Area: less than one acre
- Built: 1925
- Architect: Minchin, Sidney
- Architectural style: Sullivanesque
- NRHP reference No.: 13000049
- Added to NRHP: March 6, 2013

The Storkline Furniture Corporation Factory was a historic factory building at 4400-4418 W. 26th Street in the South Lawndale neighborhood of Chicago, Illinois. The Storkline Furniture Corporation, a nationally popular children's furniture company, produced all of its furniture at the factory. Founded in 1915 as the Glass Novelty Company, the corporation renamed itself after its most popular product in the 1920s and built a new factory in 1925. Chicago architect Sidney Minchin designed the brick building, incorporating Sullivanesque terra cotta decorations in the facade. As one of the only companies specializing in children's furniture, Storkline dominated the market in the 1920s and 1930s, and it saw continued success in the following decades. It produced furniture at the factory until another furniture company bought the corporation in the 1960s.

The factory was added to the National Register of Historic Places on March 6, 2013. It was destroyed in a large fire on November 5, 2016.
