= East Village Historic District (Chicago) =

Historic district in Illinois, United States

- U.S. National Register of Historic Places
- U.S. Historic district
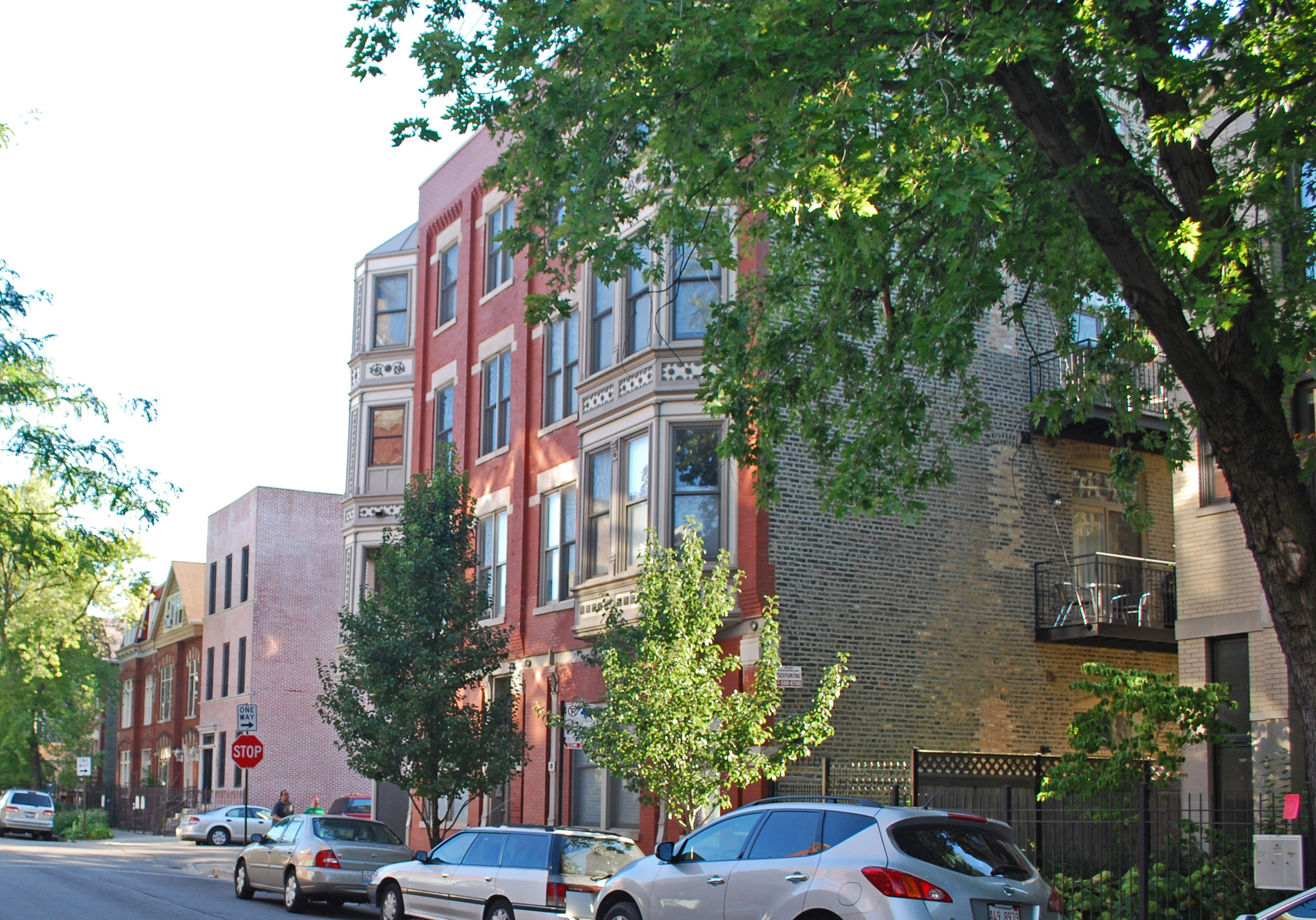

- Location within Chicago metropolitan area Location within Illinois Location within the United States
- Location: Bounded by Division St. and Chicago, Hermitage and Damen Aves., Chicago, Illinois
- Coordinates: 41°53′59″N 87°40′26″W
- Area: 67 acres (27 ha)
- MPS: Ethnic (European) Historic Settlement in the city of Chicago (1860-1930)
- NRHP reference No.: 09000459
- Added to NRHP: December 8, 2009

The East Village Historic District is a historic district in the East Village neighborhood of Chicago, Illinois. The district is primarily residential and includes the oldest portions of the neighborhood. German immigrants and German Americans settled and developed the district from 1870 to 1920. Settlers were drawn to the area due to its proximity to jobs, both in local businesses and in larger industries such as brewing. Many of the architects and builders of the district's homes were German as well; they generally built houses in vernacular styles using masonry. After 1920, the neighborhood became primarily Polish; its demographics shifted again in the 1960s due to Hispanic settlement.

The district was added to the National Register of Historic Places on December 8, 2009.
