= Pyle-National Company Plant =

- U.S. National Register of Historic Places
- Location within Chicago metropolitan area Location within Illinois Location within the United States
- Location: 1334 N. Kostner Ave., Chicago, Illinois
- Coordinates: 41°54′21″N 87°44′11″W
- Built: 1916
- Architect: Davidson & Weiss
- NRHP reference No.: 100006017
- Added to NRHP: January 19, 2021

The Pyle-National Company Plant, now known as The Terminal, is a historic industrial plant at 1334 North Kostner Avenue in the Humboldt Park neighborhood of Chicago, Illinois. The Pyle-National Company, which produced lights for steam locomotives and other heavy machinery, built the plant in 1916. The company was founded in 1897 by George C. Pyle, an inventor who patented several designs for locomotive headlights, and businessman Royal C. Vilas. The company's products became the first successful electric locomotive headlights, and the success of Pyle-National's headlights and competing products led Congress to require electric headlights on all locomotives in 1915. Expecting increased business from the Congressional mandate, the company expanded to the Kostner plant, which had three buildings designed by the Chicago industrial architecture firm Davidson & Weiss. The plant served as Pyle-National's only production site until 1963 and was expanded several times in the intervening decades. While Pyle-National opened a new plant in South Carolina in 1963 and pivoted away from the lighting industry, it continued to use its Chicago factory until 1992.

The plant was added to the National Register of Historic Places on January 19, 2021.

== Redevelopment ==
After Pyle-National left the plant in 1992, the complex became neglected and underused, and a later owner rented parts of it to automobile-repair businesses. A partnership led by developer Gary Pachucki and Joe Mansueto bought the property for nearly $8.3 million in July 2020 and began converting it into a research-and-development campus called The Terminal.

Quantum-computing company EeroQ became the first tenant and had moved into the complex by August 2022. The approximately $70 million, multi-phase rehabilitation created 250,000 square feet of office and laboratory space; by 2024, chemical manufacturer NuMat had also become a tenant, and Landmarks Illinois gave the project a 2024 Richard H. Driehaus Foundation Preservation Award for Adaptive Reuse.
