= Otis Elevator Company Factory Building =

- U.S. National Register of Historic Places
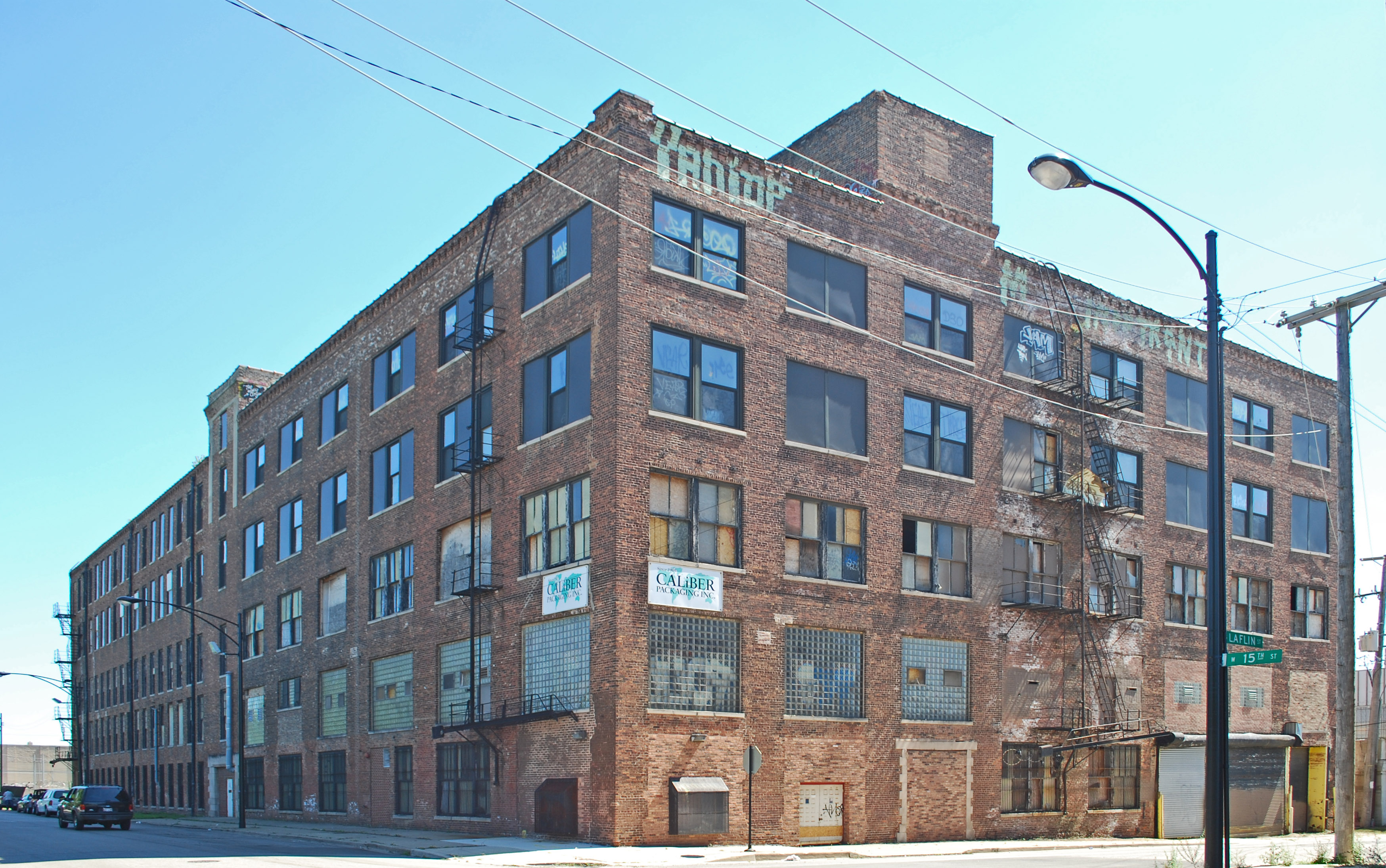

- Location within Illinois Location within the United States
- Location: 1435 W. 15th St. and 1501 S. Laflin St., Chicago, Illinois
- Coordinates: 41°51′41″N 87°39′44″W
- Area: 0.5 acres (0.20 ha)
- Built: 1900; 126 years ago
- Architect: Treat, Samuel A. & Abraham K. Adler; Jensen, J. Norman (1916 addition)
- Architectural style: Colonial Revival
- NRHP reference No.: 08001097
- Added to NRHP: November 26, 2008

The Otis Elevator Company Factory Building is a historic industrial building located at 1435 W. 15th Street in the Near West Side neighborhood of Chicago, Illinois. The Otis Elevator Company had the factory built in 1900. The company, then the nation's largest elevator manufacturer, sought to grow its sales in Chicago, as the city's growth and numerous new skyscrapers made it a profitable market for elevators. The Chicago firm of Adler & Treat designed the factory as a brick building with Colonial Revival elements. The factory served as a regional headquarters until 1914, when Otis restructured and introduced smaller regional offices; while it continued to have a Chicago office, it sold the factory building. The Riley-Schubert-Grossman Company, a wholesaling firm, purchased the building in 1916; while it only occupied the building for a short time, its extensive remodeling gave it its present-day layout.

The building was added to the National Register of Historic Places on November 26, 2008.
