= Peterson (surname) =

- Pronunciation: /ˈpiːtərsən/ PEE-tər-sən

Origin
- Origin: Nordic, English
- Meaning: "son of Peter"
- Region of origin: Swedish/Danish/English

Other names
- Variant forms: Pederson, Petersen, Pettersson, Pieterszoon

Peterson/Petersen is a Scandinavian and English patronymic surname meaning "son of Peter." The given name Peter is derived from the Greek πέτρος (petros), meaning "rock" or "stone," and has been a popular name choice throughout history due to the Christian apostle Peter. The surname is most commonly found in European countries such as UK, Sweden, Denmark, Germany, Holland, and Brussels in the northwestern region. There are an estimated 700 variant spellings of the surname. The form Peterson may also have arisen from Danish Pedersen or Petersen with a change of spelling commonly applied by Danish immigrants to English-speaking countries. On another note, the surname Peterson is native to Sweden; therefore, Peterson is the correct spelling from that country.

== People ==
=== A ===
- Adrian Peterson (born 1985), American football running back
- Adrian Peterson (American football, born 1979), American football running back
- Alexis Peterson (born 1995), American/German basketball player
- Amanda Peterson (1971–2015), American actress
- Andrew Peterson (disambiguation)
- Ann Peterson (born 1947), American Olympic diver
- Arthur Peterson (disambiguation)
- Austin Peterson (baseball) (born 1999), American baseball player
- Austin Peterson (cartoonist) (1906-2015), American screenwriter

=== B ===
- Brian Peterson (disambiguation)

=== C ===
- Carla Peterson (actress) (born 1974), Argentinian actress
- Cassandra Peterson (born 1951), American actress best known for her screen persona "Elvira"
- Charles Peterson (disambiguation)
- Christine Peterson, American forecaster
- Clark Peterson,(born 1966), film producer
- Chip Peterson, (born 1987), American swimmer
- Collin Peterson (born 1944), American politician
- Coyote Peterson (born 1981) American YouTuber and television show host

=== D ===
- Daniel Peterson (disambiguation)
- Darryn Peterson (born 2007), American basketball player
- David Peterson (disambiguation)
- Daystar Peterson (born 1992), stage name Tory Lanez, Canadian rapper and singer
- Denis Peterson, American painter
- Donald H. Peterson (1933–2018), American former astronaut
- Donna C. Peterson (born 1946), American politician and educator
- Dorothy Peterson (1897–1979), American actress
- Douglas Peterson (disambiguation)
- Drew Peterson (born 1954), American former Illinois police sergeant and convicted murderer
- Dustin Peterson (born 1994), American baseball player
- Dutton Peterson (1894–1964), American clergyman and politician

=== E ===
- Elly M. Peterson (1914–2008) American politician
- Elmer Peterson, American farmer and politician
- Elmer Peter Peterson (1904–1979), American electrician and politician
- Eric Peterson (born 1946), Canadian actor
- Eric Peterson (musician) (born 1964), American guitarist
- Erik Peterson (theologian) (1890–1960), German theologian
- Esther Peterson (1906–1997), American Assistant Secretary of Labor
- Eugene H. Peterson (1932–2018), American Presbyterian minister, scholar, theologian, author, and poet

=== F ===
- Fiona Peterson, Australian academic
- Frank Peterson (born 1963), German music producer
- Franklin P. Peterson (1930–2000), American mathematician
- Frederick Peterson (disambiguation)
- Fritz Peterson (1942–2023), American baseball player

=== G ===
- Garry Peterson (born 1945), American drummer
- G. P. "Bud" Peterson (born 1952), president of the Georgia Institute of Technology
- Gil Peterson (born 1936), American actor and singer
- Gilbert Peterson (1824–1890), American contractor
- Gilles Peterson (born 1964), English DJ
- Gordon Peterson, American broadcast journalist

=== H ===
- Halvor H. Peterson (1831–1917), American farmer and politician
- Hannah Mary Bouvier Peterson (1811–1870), American writer
- Hattie Peterson (1930–2017), All-American Girls Professional Baseball League player
- Henry Peterson (author) (1818–1891), American editor, novelist, playwright and poet
- Henry K. Peterson (1884–1966), justice of the Iowa Supreme Court

=== I ===
- Ivan Peterson (1917–1967), American veterinarian and animal researcher who has worked with pet actors in Hollywood

=== J ===
- Jace Peterson (born 1990), American baseball player
- Jens Peterson (1880–1953), Australian politician
- Jeret Peterson (1981–2011), American aerial skier
- Jerome Peterson (disambiguation)
- Jesse Peterson (1850–1921), American industrialist
- Jim Peterson (1941–2024), Canadian politician
- John Peterson (disambiguation)
- Jordan Peterson (born 1962), Canadian psychologist, political pundit and author
- Jordan Peterson (American football) (born 1987), American football coach

=== K ===
- Keith Peterson (born 1956), Canadian politician
- Kevin Peterson (born 1994), American football player
- Kristjan Jaak Peterson (1801–1822), Estonian poet
- Kyle Peterson (born 1976), American baseball player
- Kyle Peterson (politician) (born 1971), Canadian politician

=== L ===
- Laci Peterson (1975–2002), American murdered by husband Scott Peterson
- Lenka Peterson (1925–2021), American actress
- Lenette Peterson, American politician
- Liza Jessie Peterson, American playwright, actor, activist and educator
- Lynn Peterson (American politician), American politician
- Lynn Peterson (Canadian politician), Canadian mayor of Thunder Bay, Ontario

=== M ===
- Maggie Peterson (1941–2022), American actress
- Mark Peterson (disambiguation)
- Martha Peterson (born 1945), American former Central Intelligence Agency operations officer
- Martha Peterson (academic administrator) (1916–2006), American college president
- Maurice Peterson (1889–1952), British diplomat
- Michael Peterson (disambiguation)
- Minnie Peterson (1897–1989), American pioneer, packer, guide and outfitter
- Morris Peterson (born 1977), American basketball player

=== N ===
- Norm Peterson (politician) (born 1939), Australian politician

=== O ===
- Olive Peterson (1894–1965), American bridge player
- Oscar Peterson (1925–2007), Canadian jazz pianist and composer
- Oscar V. Peterson (1899–1942), United States Navy chief petty officer posthumously awarded the Medal of Honor
- Oscar W. Peterson (1887–1951), American carver of fish decoys

=== P ===
- Patrick Peterson (born 1990), American football player
- Peter Peterson (disambiguation)

=== R ===
- Ralph Peterson Jr. (1962–2021), American jazz drummer and bandleader
- Randolph W. Peterson (born 1953), American politician and judge
- Ray Peterson (1939–2005), American pop singer
- Rebecca Peterson (born 1995), Swedish tennis player
- Robert Evans Peterson (1812–1894), American book publisher and writer
- Robin Peterson (born 1979), South African cricketer
- Roger Peterson (disambiguation)
- Ronnie Peterson (1944–1978), Swedish racing driver
- Russell W. Peterson (1916–2011), American engineer and politician, governor of Delaware

=== S ===
- Scot Peterson (born 1963), American deputy sheriff acquitted of charges for his actions during the 2018 Parkland high school shooting
- Scott Peterson (disambiguation)
- Shelley Peterson (born 1952), Canadian actress
- Stephen Peterson (rower) (born 1963), American rower in the 1990 and 1996 Olympics
- Steve Peterson (disambiguation)
- Steven Peterson (born 1990), American former mixed martial artist

=== T ===
- Ted Peterson (writer), writer and video game designer
- Thage G. Peterson (1933), Swedish politician
- Thomas Mundy Peterson (1824–1904), first African-American to vote in an election
- Thorleif T. Peterson (1885–1982), American farmer and politician
- Todd Peterson (place kicker) (born 1970), American football player
- Trudy Huskamp Peterson (born 1945), American historian, former acting Archivist of the United States

=== V ===
- Vadal Peterson (1892–1976), American college sports coach
- Val Peterson (1903–1983), American politician, governor of Nebraska
- Vicki Peterson (born 1958), American pop musician

=== W ===
- Walter R. Peterson, Jr. (1922–2011), American politician, governor of New Hampshire
- W. Wesley Peterson (1924–2009), American mathematician and computer scientist
- William Peterson (disambiguation)

== Fictional characters ==
- Minty Peterson, in the soap opera EastEnders
- Norm Peterson, on the American sitcom television series Cheers
