= Jack Petersen =

Jack Petersen may refer to:

- Jack Petersen (boxer)
- Jack Petersen (guitarist)

== See also ==
- John Petersen (disambiguation)
- Jack Peterson (disambiguation)
