= Neighborhood House =

Neighborhood House may refer to:

== Places ==
- Lenox Hill Neighborhood House, multi-service community-based organization in Manhattan, New York City, US
- Neighborhood House (Louisville, Kentucky), US
- Neighborhood House (Portland, Oregon), US, listed on the National Register of Historic Places
- North East Neighborhood House, Minneapolis, Minnesota, US
- The Shack Neighborhood House, Morgantown, West Virginia, US
- Trinity Neighborhood House, historic brick townhouse in East Boston, Massachusetts, US

=== Illinois ===
- Erie Neighborhood House, social service agency in Chicago, Illinois, US
- Neighborhood House (Chicago), US, settlement movement organization in Englewood neighborhood of Chicago, Illinois, US
- Lessie Bates Davis Neighborhood House, social services organization in East St. Louis, Illinois, US
- Onward Neighborhood House, non-profit organization in Chicago, Illinois, US

== Other ==
- Neighborhood House (film), 1936 American comedy film
