= Charles Peters (disambiguation) =

Charles Peters (1926–2023) was an American journalist.

Charles Peters may also refer to:

- Charles Peters (physician) (1695–1746), English physician
- Charles Jeffery Peters (1773–1848), Canadian lawyer
- Charles Bowers Peters (1877–1957), American politician
- Charles Rollo Peters (1862–1928), American oil painter
- Charles Rollo Peters (1892–1967), his son, American actor, director, painter, and designer

== See also ==
- Charles Peterson (disambiguation)
