= Charles Peterson =

Charles Peterson may refer to:

- Charles A. Peterson (1884–1953), American politician
- Charles C. Peterson (1879–1962), American billiards player
- Charles E. Peterson (1906–2004), American architect and proponent of historic preservation
- Charles E. Peterson (coach) (1889–1959), American football and basketball coach and college dean
- Charles Gilbert Peterson (1848–1918), American contractor and mayor of Lockport, NY
- Charles Jacobs Peterson (1818–1887), American author and publisher
- Charles L. Peterson (1927–2022), American artist
- Charles Peterson (philatelist) (1933–2009), American philatelist
- Charles Peterson (photographer) (born 1964), American photographer
- Charles S. Peterson (1927–2017), American historian
- Charles Sreeve Peterson (1818–1889), early Mormon leader and first settler of Utah's Morgan Valley
- Charlie Peterson (1920–1965), Australian rules footballer
- Chip Peterson (Charles Bowne Peterson, born 1987), American swimmer
- Charles Peterson, inventor of Peterson Pipes

== See also ==
- Charles Peters (disambiguation)
