= Doug Petersen =

Doug Petersen may refer to:

- Douglas W. Petersen (1948–2014), American politician in Massachusetts
- Doug Petersen (Canadian football) (born 1969), Canadian football defensive lineman

== See also ==
- Douglas Peterson (disambiguation)
- Doug Pederson, American football coach
