= Onward Neighborhood House =

American non-profit organization

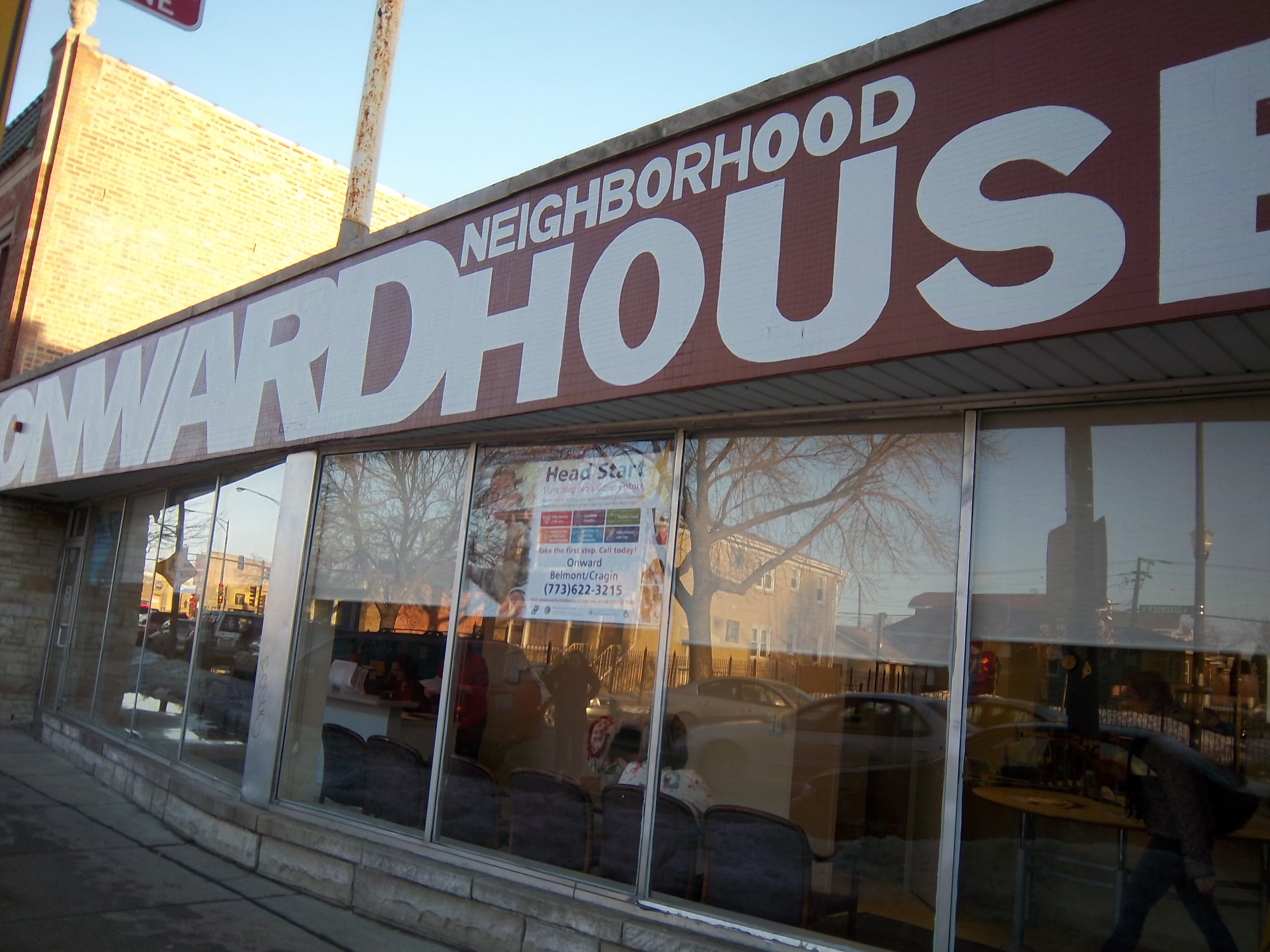
- Founded: 1893; 133 years ago
- Founder: Onward Presbyterian Church
- Type: Non-profit organization
- Headquarters: Chicago, Illinois, United States
- Location: 5423 W Diversey Ave, Chicago IL
- Coordinates: 41°55′52″N 87°45′44″W
- Website: www.onwardhouse.org

Onward Neighborhood House is a non-profit organization located in the Belmont Cragin neighborhood of Chicago, Illinois. Originally founded as a settlement house in Chicago's West Town neighborhood during the 1890s, Onward House now provides direct services to working class and immigrant families on Chicago's Northwest side. Onward's mission is to open doors, improve lives, and uplift communities through educational, economic, and support services. The organization offers a variety of programs and services, serving both children and adults.

== History ==
=== 1868–1990 ===
Onward Neighborhood House was founded in 1868 as Mission Sunday School, a small religious organization run out of a storefront located at Hoyne and Grand Avenue. Following the example of Jane Addams' Hull House, Mission Sunday School formed Onward Presbyterian Church in 1893, on the corner of Ohio and Leavitt St in West Town, serving the community as a settlement house. Following the settlement movement tradition, Onward served as a church, school, refuge and community center for the large immigrant population and provided vital social services to alleviate poverty and squalid conditions.

In 1926, members of the Glencoe Union Church and Winnetka Congregational Church formed a board of directors and took over the administration of Onward House. In 1928, a new building was constructed at 600 N. Leavitt, which would serve as the primary location for the next 86 years. During the Great Depression, like many community organizations, Onward provided vital aid to struggling families. As one volunteer wrote, "During these days of ''depression'' much of the time of the full-time workers is spent acting as ''middle-men'' between the relief station and the unemployed person, helping speed up delayed groceries, back rents, clothing and coal." Following the Great Depression, Onward House would continue to provide social services.

Onward House incorporated as a non-profit organization in December 1943, its mission was to "maintain and conduct an organization to minister to the spiritual, moral, mental and physical needs of the community in which it is now or shall hereafter be located." Onward continued to be an active part of the West Town community during this time period, expanding their campus with the purchase of an annex building in 1967.

=== 1990–present ===
In response to demographic change during the 1990s and early 2000s, Onward began to expand its services to the nearby Belmont Cragin neighborhood. In 2008, Onward House opened an expanded center for their childcare programs on 5423 W. Diversey Ave. In 2014, Onward House completely moved to Belmont Cragin, purchasing a secondary building at 5413 W. Diversey. This building was remodeled and opened as the Hank and Kim Marshall Community Resource and Education Center 2016. The original West Town building was demolished in 2014.

== Current Programs ==
=== Food pantry ===
In association with the Greater Chicago Food Depository, Onward Neighborhood House operates a food bank.

=== Childhood Education ===
==== Early Childhood Education ====
Onward Neighborhood House provides daycare for children ages 2 to 5. The year-round, full day, pre-school services allow parents to work full-time, pursue their education, and support their families without having to worry about their child's safety and educational development. Onward offers both center-based and home-based programs. The Center Based Program is at Onward House where teachers are utilized while the Home Based Program is at the child's home and parents use the Parent as a Teacher curriculum (PAT). Within this program, Onward House uses the Creative Curriculum, developed by Teaching Strategies LLC.

==== School Age Program ====
The School Age Program provides a place for working families to keep their children after school. The program provides assistance with their homework and tutoring, and students have the chance to take part in additional learning activities, such as planned educational activities, arts and crafts, cooking experiences and physical exercise. The program also meets on holidays when school is not in session. Students also attend field trips planned on days in which children are off from school during the school year and up to three times per month in the summer. The program also offers tutoring from Glenbrook South and New Trier High School students once week to help support children who need more assistance.

==== Sceneworks Pilot Program ====
In collaboration with Poverty Alleviation Chicago, Onward provides students the opportunity to gain confidence and self-esteem through improv-based activities through its 8-week summer program. This program networks with the school age program.

=== Adult Education ===
==== English as a Second Language (ESL) & ESL Study Groups ====
Onward House, with the help from Wilbur Wright Community College and Northwest Community Church, offers computerized levels 3 and 4 English as Second Language (ESL) classes for adults in the evenings. Participants are able to practice their English through a study group on Tuesdays from 9AM-11AM.

==== GED Classes ====
Onward, in collaboration with Wright College, offers classes designed to assist participants in passing the General Education Development test, in both English and Spanish.

==== Citizenship Classes & Immigration Workshops ====
Onward House hosts both informational workshops and regularly scheduled classes to offer legal guidance related to immigration, and the citizenship process. Workshops were designed for immigrant families to receive more information on topics such as immigration processes, how and where to find immigration forms and how to track applications, among other topics.

== Fundraising ==
Onward hosts events to help fund raise for the organization and to bring the community together. The current events include a gala and a golf outing.

== Accreditations ==
Onward Neighborhood House has been accredited by the National Association for the Education of Young Children, ExcelleRate Illinois, and Guidestar.
