= Scott Peterson =

Scott Peterson may refer to:

- Scott Peterson (writer) (born c. 1966), American journalist; staff writer for The Christian Science Monitor
- Scott Peterson (comics) (born 1968), American comic book writer and editor
- Scott Peterson (1963–1994), American professional wrestler; a founding member of the Southern Rockers tag team
- Scott Lee Peterson (born 1972), American salesman convicted of the murder of his wife Laci Peterson

== See also ==
- Scot Peterson, American former police officer
- Scott Petersen (born 1970), American professional golfer
- Scott Petersen (politician), American politician
- Scott Petersen, runner in the 1997 World Championships in Athletics – Men's 1500 metres
