= Jack Peterson =

Jack Peterson may refer to:

- "Rifle Jack" Peterson (c.1745–1850), hero of the American Revolutionary War
- Jack Richard Peterson, (born 1998), American media personality
- Jack Peterson (field hockey), (1880–?), Irish field hockey player
- Jack Peterson (rugby league), Australian rugby league footballer

== See also ==
- John Peterson (disambiguation)
- Jerome Peterson (disambiguation)
