= John Lothrop Motley School =

- U.S. National Register of Historic Places
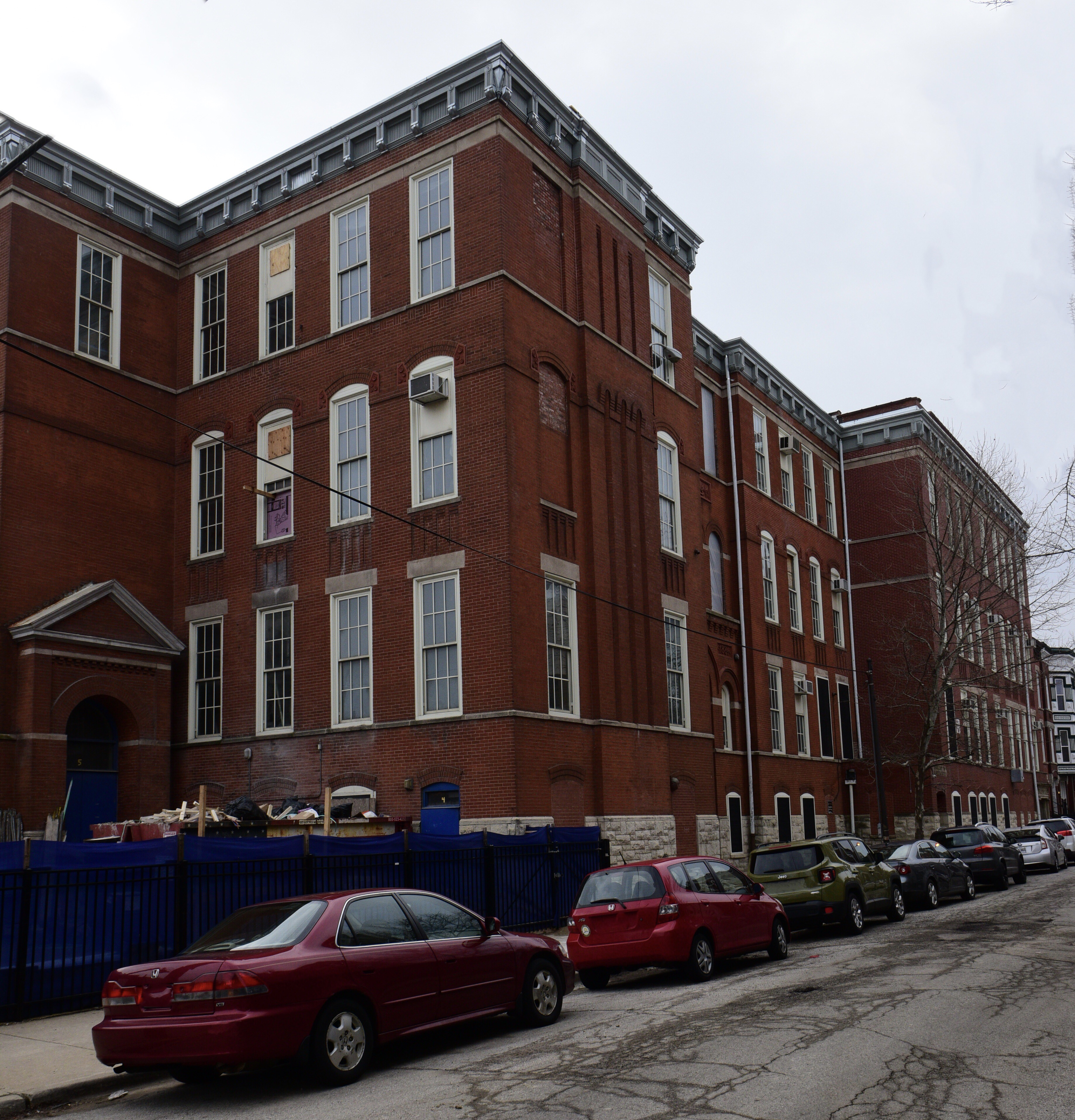

- Location within Chicago metropolitan area Location within Illinois Location within the United States
- Location: 739 N. Ada St., Chicago, Illinois
- Coordinates: 41°53′44″N 87°39′40″W
- Built: 1884
- Architect: John J. Flanders, Norman Smith Patton
- Architectural style: Renaissance Revival
- NRHP reference No.: 100001562
- Added to NRHP: March 6, 2013

The John Lothrop Motley School is a historic school building at 739 N. Ada Street in the West Town neighborhood of Chicago, Illinois. It was built in 1884 to serve the growing neighborhood, as an influx of immigrants and Illinois' 1883 Compulsory Education Law had greatly increased its student population. John J. Flanders, who became chief architect of the Chicago Board of Education in 1884, designed the school according to a standardized plan which was used throughout the city. The Renaissance Revival school has an asymmetrical layout and includes several small side entrances, ornamental brickwork on its chimneys, and a metal cornice. Flanders' design was a stark change from the symmetrical Italianate plans of earlier Chicago public schools. The district's student population continued to increase in the following decades, and the Board of Education built an addition onto the school in 1898 as a result. The school operated continuously until closing in 2013.

The building was added to the National Register of Historic Places on September 5, 2017.
