= Elizabeth Peabody School =

- U.S. National Register of Historic Places
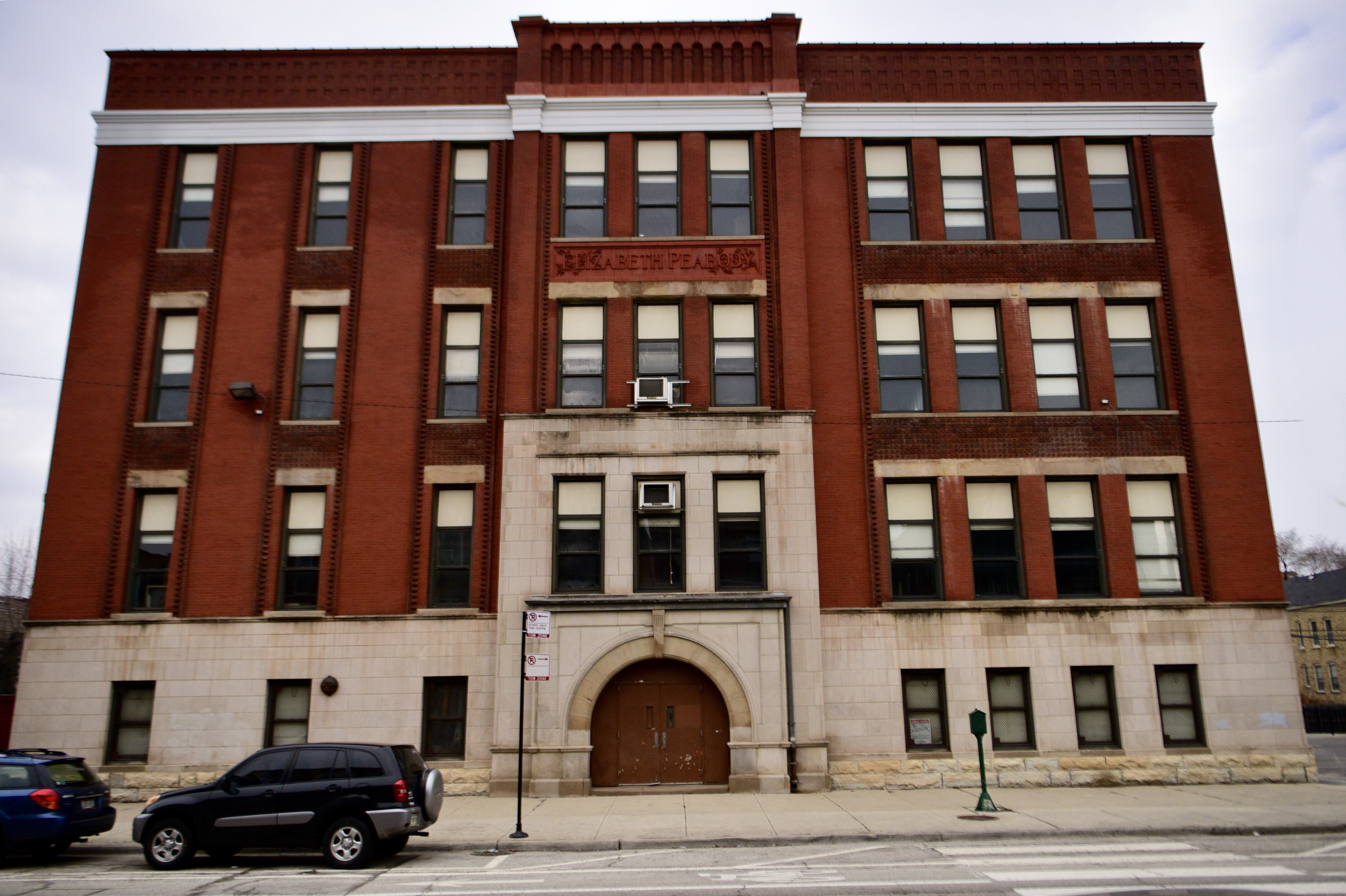

- Location within Chicago metropolitan area Location within Illinois Location within the United States
- Location: 1444 W. Augusta Blvd., Chicago, Illinois
- Coordinates: 41°53′59″N 87°39′50″W
- Built: 1894
- Architect: W. August Fiedler
- Architectural style: Queen Anne, Richardsonian Romanesque
- NRHP reference No.: 100001923
- Added to NRHP: December 26, 2017

The Elizabeth Peabody School is a historic school building at 1444 W. Augusta Boulevard in the West Town neighborhood of Chicago, Illinois. The school opened in 1894 to serve the growing number of students in West Town, as immigration and changes to education laws had led to overcrowding at other neighborhood schools. W. August Fiedler, the chief architect of the Chicago Board of Education, designed the school. His design, one of his first after becoming chief architect, combines the utilitarian form of standardized Chicago school designs of the 1870s with elements of the Queen Anne and Richardsonian Romanesque styles. The school served students continuously from its opening until it closed in 2013.

The building was added to the National Register of Historic Places on December 26, 2017.
