= Chicago Academy for the Arts =

High school in Chicago, Illinois

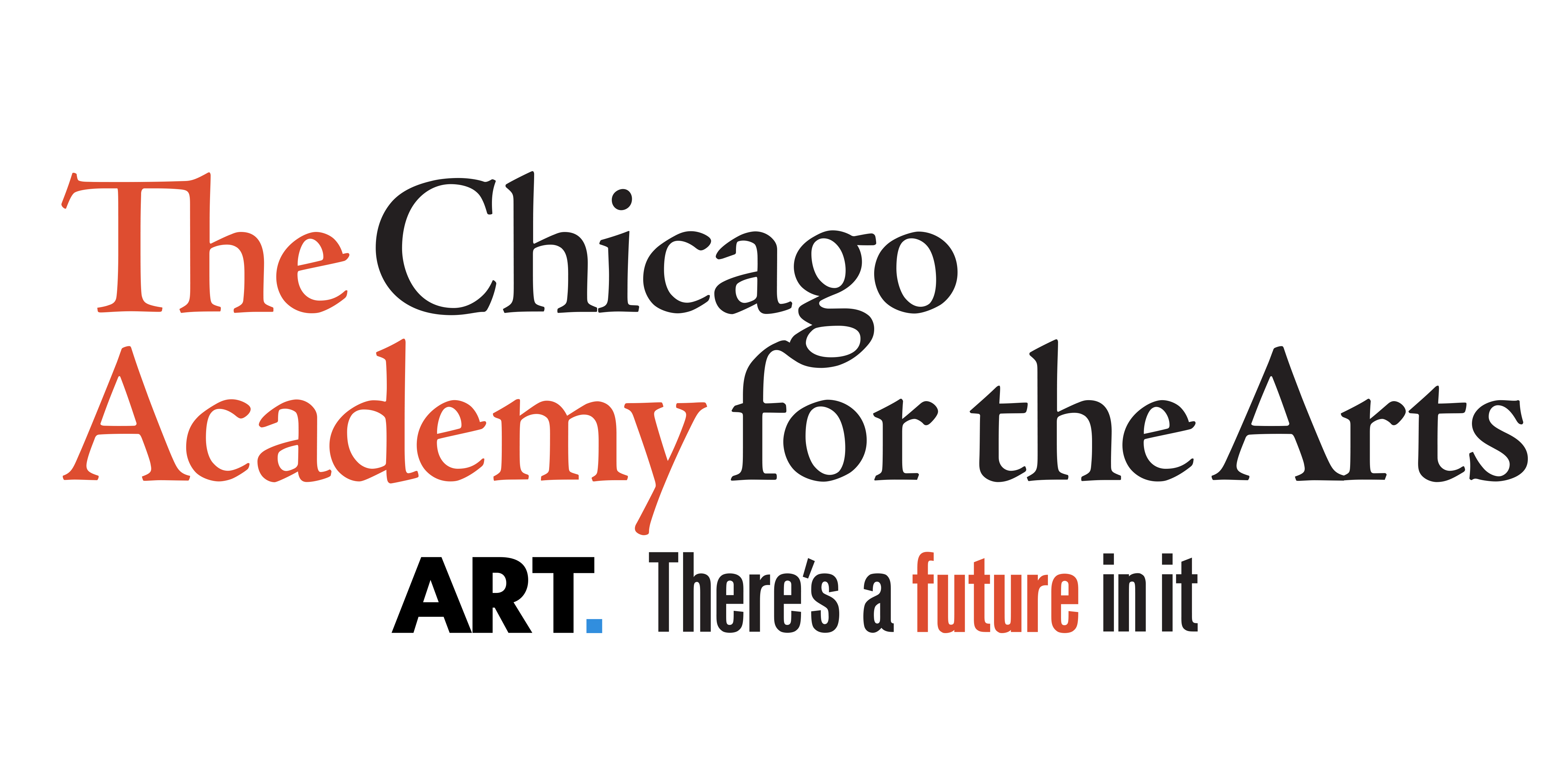

Location
- 1010 W. Chicago Avenue; Chicago, Illinois 60642; United States

Information
- School type: Private, Independent
- Opened: 1981
- CEEB code: 140–627
- NCES School ID: A9303202
- Head of school: Dr. Melinda Zacher Ronayne
- Teaching staff: 40
- Grades: 9–12
- Gender: Coed
- Enrollment: 150 (2015–2016)
- Student to teacher ratio: 4:1
- Campus type: Urban
- Accreditation: Independent School Association of the Central States (ISACS), Illinois School Board of Education (ISBE), National Association of Independent Schools (NAIS), Arts Schools Network (ASN), Illinois High School Association (IHSA)
- Website: chicagoacademyforthearts.org

The Chicago Academy for the Arts, founded in 1981, is an independent high school for the performing and visual arts located in the River West neighborhood of Chicago, Illinois. It was named a National School of Distinction by the John F. Kennedy Center for the Performing Arts. The Academy offers a co-curricular program: college-preparatory academic classes and professional-level arts training. The school day consists of six academic periods followed by a three-plus hour immersion in one of six arts disciplines: Dance, Media Arts (filmmaking, animation, creative writing), Music, Musical Theatre, Theatre, and Visual Arts. Students participate in more than 100 productions throughout the course of the school year, including concerts, plays, readings, screenings, recordings, and exhibitions.

== Background ==
The Chicago Academy for the Arts high school was founded in 1981 by a group of artists, educators, and business professionals for the purpose of bringing a performing arts high school to Illinois. It is located in the historic school building constructed for St. John Cantius Parish.

The Academy students audition and submit portfolios during the admissions process. whereby only prospective students demonstrating an aptitude, potential, and dedication to their art are admitted.

In 2012, The Academy celebrated its 30th anniversary with a series of events, culminating in a gala event at the Harris Theater for Music and Dance at the Millennium Park Terrace. During this year, the school revised its mission statement to more clearly reflect the further development of its educational philosophy which integrates academics, arts, and the environment to educate the intellectual artist. The new mission statement reads:

The Chicago Academy for the Arts transforms emerging artists through a curriculum and culture which connect intellectual curiosity, critical thinking, and creativity to impart skills to lead and collaborate across diverse communities.

The atmosphere at the school has been described as encouraging and nurturing. It was once one of the few high schools to feature a course on existentialism and have workshops taught by guest tutors like Roger Ebert. A majority of graduates continue to higher education and/or professional arts careers.

== Arts aspect of school ==
Throughout the school year, students participate in more than 100 productions, including concerts and recitals, musicals, plays, readings, screenings, exhibitions, outreach opportunities, and benefits. Arts departments conclude each semester with a one-on-one student assessment and review process that includes self-reflections and goal-setting, juries, portfolio reviews, and interviews with faculty.

Each year, The Academy presents their All-School Showcase, highlighting the year's top work from each arts department.

== Admissions ==
The Academy students audition and submit portfolios during the admissions process. whereby only prospective students demonstrating an aptitude, potential, and dedication to their art are admitted. Admissions is a multi-step process, beginning with the audition in a chosen department. Once applicants successfully advance through the audition, their academic record is reviewed. Students must also take the Independent School Entrance Exam prior to enrollment. The Academy offers four opportunities to take the exam at the school. The admissions process concludes with a parent interview.

== Notable alumni ==
- Leah Borromeo, documentary filmmaker and journalist
- Lara Flynn Boyle, actress
- Ali Cobrin, actress
- Tom Gold, dancer
- Craig Hall, dancer, New York City Ballet
- Lalah Hathaway, Grammy Award-winning musician
- Jeremiah Jae, producer and multimedia artist
- Kimberly Jones, author
- Pete Kovachevich guitarist
- Kevin Miles, actor, "Jake from State Farm"
- Jack Peterson, filmmaker
- Adam Rifkin, producer
- Cecily Strong, actor, Saturday Night Live
- Sophie Thatcher, actress and musician
- Justin Tranter songwriter and musician (Semi Precious Weapons)
- Robin Tunney, actress
- Nan Woods, actress
- Alex Wurman, composer
- Ravyn Lenae, American R&B singer and songwriter
