= Flat Iron Building (Chicago) =

Building in Illinois, United States

Coordinates: 41°54′37″N 87°40′37″W

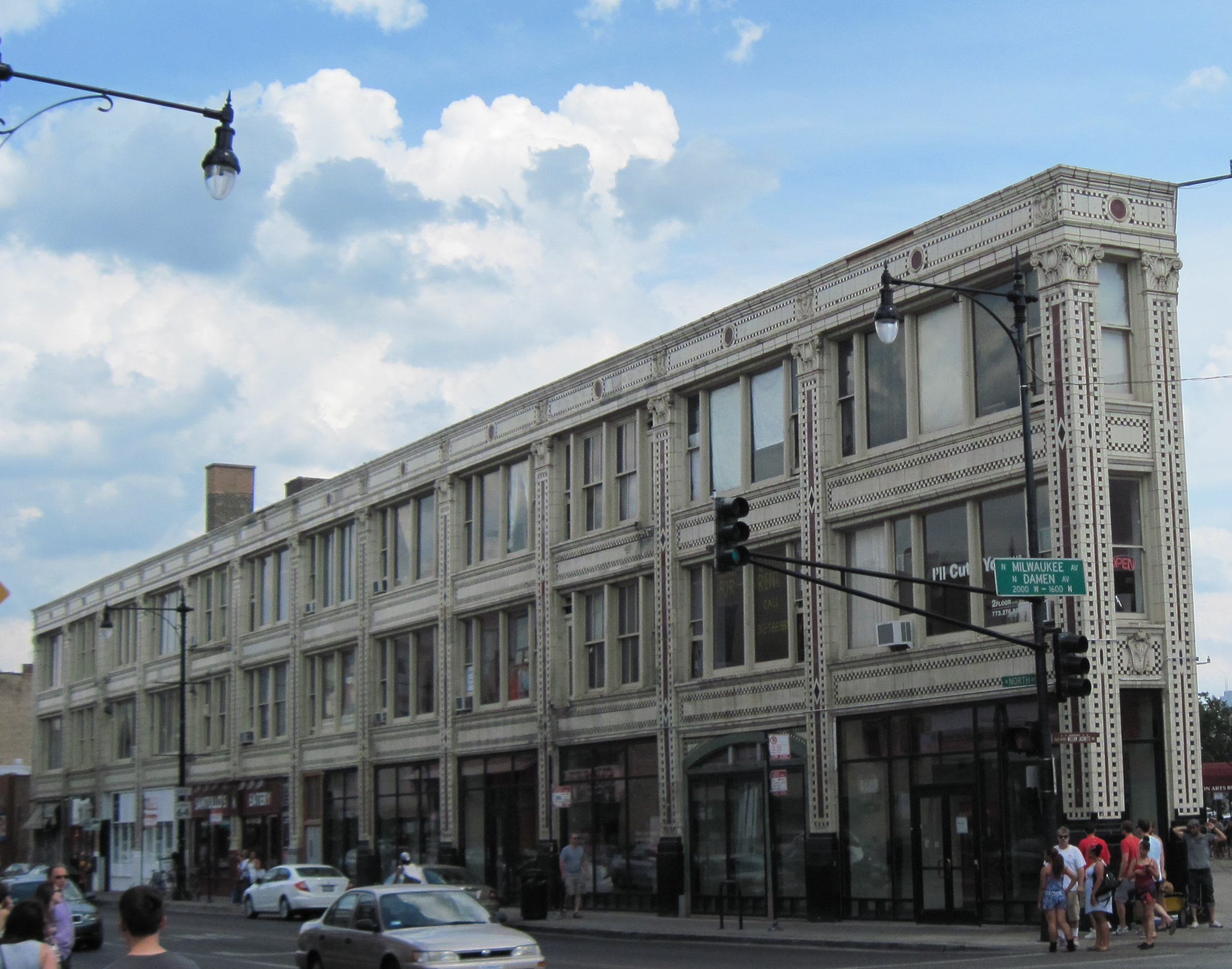
Flat Iron Building in Chicago

The Flat Iron Building is located in the Wicker Park district of West Town, Chicago, Illinois. The building is located at the intersection of Milwaukee Avenue, North Avenue, and Damen Avenue. Since the 1980s, it has served as an artists colony, and features visual artists and musicians of all disciplines.

The building was the historic centerpiece of the annual Around the Coyote arts festival held in the neighborhood each summer. It is located across the street from the Northwest Tower.
