= Polish National Alliance Headquarters =

- U.S. National Register of Historic Places
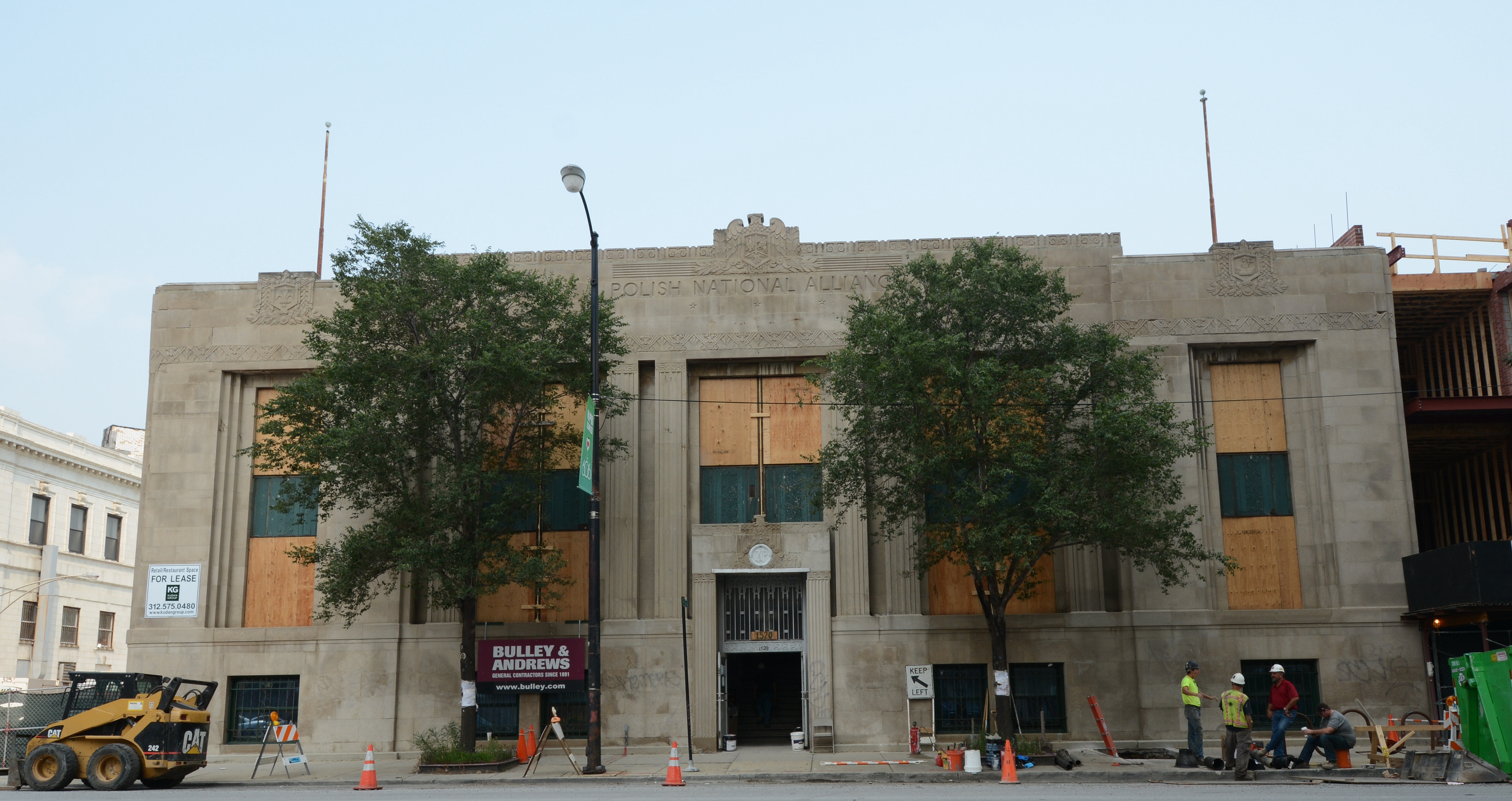

- Location within Chicago metropolitan area Location within Illinois Location within the United States
- Location: 1514-1520 W. Division St., Chicago, Illinois
- Coordinates: 41°54′12″N 87°39′57″W
- Built: 1938
- Architect: Joseph A. Slupkowski
- Architectural style: Art Deco
- NRHP reference No.: 14001063
- Added to NRHP: December 23, 2014

The Polish National Alliance Headquarters, located at 1514-1520 W. Division Street in the West Town neighborhood of Chicago, is the former headquarters of the Polish National Alliance. The Polish National Alliance is a fraternal organization for Polish-Americans which was founded in 1880. The organization was founded to provide aid to new Polish immigrants, promote the preservation of Polish culture in America, and campaign for an independent Poland. Its headquarters building at 1514-1520 W. Division opened in 1938. The organization had been seeking a larger headquarters for some time before then, but the Great Depression and internal conflicts prevented it from building one. Architect Joseph A. Slupkowski, a Polish-American himself who designed several buildings for Chicago's Polish community, designed the Art Deco headquarters. The organization used the building as its headquarters until 1976; during this time, it raised money for the U.S. troops in World War II, successfully supported a law to accept Polish refugees to the United States after the war, and helped establish the Polish American Congress.

The building was added to the National Register of Historic Places on December 23, 2014.
