= Andrew Peterson =

Andrew Peterson may refer to:

- Andrew Peterson (musician) (born 1974), American Christian singer-songwriter and author
- Andrew Peterson (soccer) (born 1984), American soccer player, currently playing for Minnesota Thunder in the USL First Division
- Andrew Thomas Turton Peterson (1813–1906), Anglo-Indian barrister, spiritualist and amateur architect
- Andrew Peterson (American football) (born 1972), retired American professional football player
- Andrew Peterson (farmer) (1818–1898), Swedish immigrant, fruit farmer, and botanist
  - Andrew Peterson Farmstead, Waconia, Minnesota
- Andrew Peterson, flight engineer on Federal Express Flight 705
- Andy Peterson, American college football coach

== See also ==
- Andrew Petersen (1870–1953), U.S. Representative from New York
