= John Petersen =

John Petersen may refer to:

- John Petersen (footballer) (born 1972), Faroese footballer
- John Petersen (politician) (1948-2018), Faroese politician in Cabinet of Anfinn Kallsberg I
- John Petersen (musician) (1942–2007), American drummer
- John C. Petersen (1842–1887), Wisconsin legislator
- John D. Petersen (born 1947), former president of the University of Tennessee system
- Johnny Petersen (born 1947), Danish football manager
- John "Chap" Petersen (born 1968), Virginia politician

== See also ==
- Jack Petersen (1911–1990), Welsh boxer and two-time British heavyweight boxing champion
- Jack Petersen (guitarist) (born 1933), American jazz guitarist and jazz studies pioneer
- Jann Ingi Petersen (born 1984), Faroese footballer
- John Peterson (disambiguation)
