= John Peterson =

John Peterson is the name of:

- John Peterson (American football) (born 1948), football coach, Frostburg State University, Maryland
- John Peterson (author) (1924–2002), American author of children's books
- John Peterson (golfer) (born 1989), American professional golfer
- John Peterson (Pennsylvania politician) (born 1938), American politician from Pennsylvania
- John Peterson (wrestler) (born 1948), American wrestler and Olympic champion in Freestyle wrestling
- John B. Peterson (Indiana politician) (1850–1944), American politician from Indiana
- John B. Peterson (Nebraska politician) (1899–1974), American politician from Nebraska
- John Bertram Peterson (1871–1944), Catholic bishop of Manchester, 1932–1944
- John C. Peterson (1948–2025), American politician from Kansas
- John W. Peterson (1921–2006), American songwriter

== See also ==
- John Petersen (disambiguation)
- Jack Peterson (disambiguation)
- Jerome Peterson (disambiguation)
