= Jack R. Peterson =

American media personality on incels

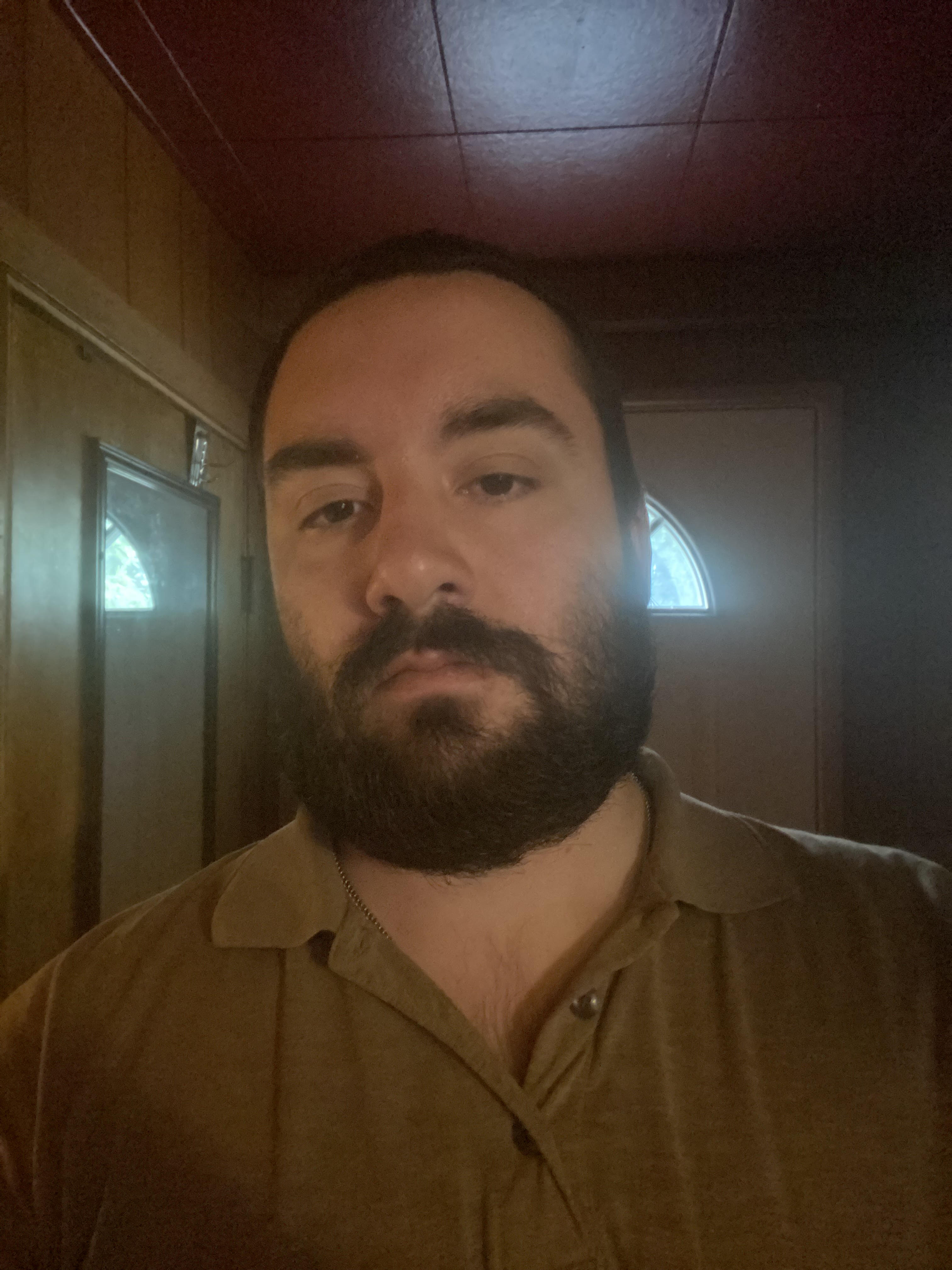
- Peterson in 2022
- Born: Kalerthon Demetro; Chicago, Illinois, U.S.
- Known for: Incelosphere spokesperson

Jack Richard Peterson is an American filmmaker, media personality, and former, self-proclaimed representative of a community of the incelosphere named incels.me.

Certain media outlets describe Jack as a spokesperson for incels.me during April 2018, while The Daily Beast describes him as unpopular within incels.me and also at one point sanctioned by incels.me staff during April 2018. During his involvement with the forum and after his alleged forum departure in May 2018, he became an on-off media personality on the subject of incels from 2018 to 2021.

After the 2018 Toronto van attack, Jack disavowed misogynistic incels.me members and spoke out against hate speech in media interviews, eventually claiming to have left all incel communities entirely.

== Incelosphere activity ==
=== incels.me activity ===
Peterson has claimed in media interviews to have been a minor staff member of incels.me and presented himself as an incels.me spokesperson during April 2018. Journalist Mandy Stadtmiller paints a different picture. During April 2018, while Peterson was still a member of the incels.me forum, Stadtmiller writes that he was banned by incels.me staff from the incels.me public chat room, before Peterson made a 30-minute PowerPoint video to be let back in. According to Stadtmiller, Peterson was also insulted as a 'status-seeker' and an 'opportunist' by the incels.me community for attempting to represent their community and trying to paint the incels.me forum in a positive light.

=== Departure from incels.me ===
Peterson subsequently began portraying incels in general in a more negative light, describing many as 'entitled' and stating he changed his mind about the hate speech on the incels.me forum being 'ironic'. During May 2018, Peterson announced on his YouTube channel that he left incels.me voluntarily by requesting a permanent ban on incels.me. He appeared on Invisibilia in April 2019 stating he was in the process of changing in whatever way he could to "make my life not horrible".

=== Incel podcast ===
He previously ran the "Incelcast", wherein he interviewed incels and discussed how they came to their position. His podcast also discussed the hikikomori phenomenon in Japan and the likelihood of the same thing happening in the Western world.

=== Views on incels ===
He believes that involuntary celibacy is a social phenomenon rather than a movement and has described online communities as support groups for discussing depression and loneliness. Peterson describes incels as commonly being males in their late teens who are shy.

Peterson has compared the demonization of inceldom to the generalizations and subsequent xenophobic and Islamophobic sentiments faced by Muslims in the aftermath of Islamist violence.

== Biography ==
Peterson's birth name is Kalerthon Demetro. Peterson first stumbled upon the manosphere at the age of 11 on 4chan. According to the Daily Beast, Peterson dropped out of the Chicago Academy for the Arts.

Despite claiming to be incel, Peterson has stated that he has had a girlfriend in the past and claims it was not a productive relationship.

Peterson was reported missing in December 2019, but was quickly located.
