= Charlie Peterson =

Australian rules footballer

Personal information
- Full name: Charles Frederick Peterson
- Born: 12 February 1920; Maldon, Victoria
- Died: 15 October 1965 (aged 45); North Melbourne, Victoria
- Original team: Melrose Stars

Playing career^{1}
Years	Club	Games (Goals)
1942	North Melbourne	1 (2)
- ^{1} Playing statistics correct to the end of 1942.

Charles Frederick Peterson (12 February 1920 – 15 October 1965) was an Australian rules footballer who played with North Melbourne in the Victorian Football League (VFL).
