= Charles Peters (physician) =

English physician

- Born: 1695
- Died: 1746 (aged 50–51)
- Occupation: Physician

Charles Peters (1695–1746) was an English physician.

== Biography ==
Peters was the son of John Peters of London. He was born in 1695. He matriculated from Christ Church, Oxford on 31 March 1710, graduated B.A. in 1713 and M.A. not till 1724. Dr. Richard Mead encouraged him to study medicine, and lent him a copy of the rare editio princeps, printed at Verona in 1530, of that Latin poem of Hieronymus Fracastorius entitled ‘Syphilis,’ which has provided a scientific name for a long series of pathological phenomena. Peters published an edition of ‘Syphilis sive Morbus Gallicus’ in 1720. It is a quarto finely printed by Jonah Bowyer at the Rose in St. Paul's Churchyard, and has a portrait of Frascatorius engraved by Vertue for frontispiece. The contents of the dedication to Mead indicate that the mind of the editor was more occupied with literary than with scientific questions, for the only allusion he makes to the contents of the poem is to offer emendations of three lines (bk. ii. ver. 199 and 428 and bk. iii. ver. 41). He is said to have graduated M.D. at Leyden in 1724, but his name does not appear in Peacock's ‘Index.’ He was elected a Radcliffe travelling fellow on 12 July 1725, and graduated M.B. and M.D. at Oxford, on 8 Nov. 1732. In 1733 he was appointed physician-extraordinary to the king, and was elected a fellow of the Royal College of Physicians of London on 16 April 1739, in which year he was also appointed physician-general to the army. He was physician to St. George's Hospital from April 1735 to February 1746, and was a censor in the College of Physicians in 1744; but illness prevented him from serving his full period. He published in the ‘Philosophical Transactions’ (vol. xliii.) in 1744–5, ‘The Case of a Person bit by a Mad Dog,’ a paper on hydrophobia, in which he expresses a favourable opinion as to the usefulness of warm baths in that disease. He died in 1746. There are two letters in his hand to Sir Hans Sloane in the British Museum referring to his fellowship.
