= Erie Neighborhood House =

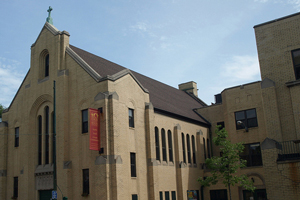
Erie Neighborhood House still provides services to the community at its historic 1347 W. Erie St. location.

Erie Neighborhood House is a social service agency that works primarily with low-income, immigrant families in Chicago, Illinois. Operations began in 1870 as a ministry of Holland Presbyterian Church, a Protestant congregation located northwest of Chicago's Loop, and the organization quickly became part of the settlement house movement that emerged in the late 19th century. It currently offers programs and services from four locations—two in Chicago's West Town community area, a third in Little Village, and fourth at Jose De Diego Elementary School in East Humboldt Park—to a population characterized as predominantly Latino.

== History ==
Erie Neighborhood House traces its history back to the founding of Holland Presbyterian Church, a small congregation planted at the corner of N. Noble St. and W. Erie St. in 1870, at which time the neighborhood consisted primarily of Dutch, Scandinavian, and German immigrants. The congregation's minister, Rev. Emanuel Van Orden, and its members began serving their neighbors in the West Town community through a variety of programs, including kindergarten and Sunday school.

Sixteen years later, in 1886, the congregation moved a half block east to 1347 W. Erie St. and changed its name to Erie Chapel. In 1893, it was selected as one of 20 founding members of Chicago's Free Kindergarten Association. Erie Chapel expanded facilities at its new location two years later to accommodate its growing youth programs, choirs for children and adults, and industrial classes.

As the social gospel movement began to take hold in American religious thought, the Chicago Federation of Settlements—of which Erie House became a member—formed at Hull House in 1894, the agency started by social work and settlement house matriarch Jane Addams.

Florence Towne helped cement Erie House's reputation in the community.

The demographics of the West Town community began to transition at the turn of the 20th century as Italian and Polish immigrants populated the area near and around Erie Chapel. By 1915, Erie Chapel consisted of three staff members and an annual budget of $6,400 (roughly $150,000 when adjusted for inflation), at which point it incorporated and renamed itself Erie Chapel Institute. One notable staff member, Florence Towne, served as the kindergarten teacher and girls group leader from 1914 to 1926, at which time she was appointed head resident. Towne's faith, generosity and resilience earned her a reputation far beyond the walls of Erie House, prompting Reader's Digest to label her the "Angel of the Alleys." She served families at Erie House from 1914 until her death in 1951, living on-site in staff quarters at 1347 W. Erie St. for the last 25 years of her life.

In 1936, a new building was dedicated at 1347 W. Erie St. with the words TO THE GLORY OF GOD AND SERVICE TO HIS CHILDREN etched into the cornerstone. It was then that the settlement house adopted Erie Neighborhood House as its name, supporting a staff of 12 and upwards of 50 Works Progress Administration (WPA) laborers. Over the next two decades, Erie House expanded its initiatives to include dental care, a health clinic, a clean neighborhood program, child care to accommodate a shifting workforce in the wake of U.S. engagement in World War II, and one of the nation's first Meals on Wheels programs.

The 1950s witnessed an increase in families migrating from Puerto Rico, drawn from the island to the mainland in part by a new San Juan-to-Chicago fare promotion offered by Pan Am Airways. Many of these families settled in parts of West Town and Humboldt Park and became connected with Erie House, thus initiating the agency's demographic shift toward Chicago's growing Latino community.

Erie House spawned several independent community efforts during the 1960s: the Northwest Community Organization, co-founded with Holy Innocents Catholic Church as a mobilizing force for social change; Bickerdike Redevelopment Corporation, an affordable housing program; and Erie Family Health Center, a Northwestern University medical student-staffed health clinic serving low-income families. At the same time, construction on the Kennedy Expressway and Chicago's mounting racial tension prompted additional changes to the West Town community, as many white, European households began moving out to suburban Chicago, causing property values to plummet and a dramatic shift in neighborhood demographics.

By the 1980s, Mexican Americans were recognized as Chicago's largest group of immigrants, and the rising influence of Latin Americans in Chicago was reflected in the changing makeup of Erie House program participants as well as its staff members. Rafael Ravelo, an immigrant from Cuba, became the agency's first Latino executive director in 1985 (all three Erie House executive directors who have served since Ravelo's tenure have also been Latino, representing both the Puerto Rican and Mexican American communities served at Erie House).

The organization also launched its TEAM mentoring initiative for high school students in the 1980s in collaboration with The Northern Trust Company. A decade later, in 1995, Erie House expanded to a second West Town location a half mile away at 1701 W. Superior St., a move that move enabled the agency to greatly increase its early childhood education program capacity from 40 children to 180 children. Erie House administrative offices were also moved to this location. Erie Family Health Center renewed ties with Erie House to co-purchase the building, formerly a cardboard box factory, and moved their headquarters and clinic services to occupy the third and fourth floors.

Erie House partnered with the Little Village Development Corporation (now Enlace Chicago) in 2004 to begin offering services to residents of Chicago's Little Village community.

In 2005, the organization founded Erie Elementary Charter School (EECS) in neighboring Humboldt Park with a goal to "empower students to successfully and productively engage in the local community and broader society." For the most part, the charter school operates independently from Erie Neighborhood House, but the two continue to collaborate on certain initiatives and Erie House operates a separate after-school program on-site at EECS.

== Programs and Services ==
Erie Neighborhood House offers a wide variety of services to roughly 4,500 children and adults annually. Programs for children and youth include NAEYC-Accredited early childhood education, after-school programming—including STEM (science, technology, engineering, mathematics) and literacy initiatives—for school-aged children, and tutoring and mentoring opportunities for middle and high school youth. The agency's TEAM mentoring program boasts extremely high graduation and college placement rates for its participants and has placed significant emphasis on preparing students for careers in STEM fields.

Adult and family programs revolve around English as a Second Language (ESL) classes; workforce development; technology education; community literacy; citizenship and immigration services; a housing initiative in partnership with the Chicago Housing Authority; health and leadership programming designed to empower families with knowledge and resources for proper nutrition, exercise and self-care; and a comprehensive program that seeks to empower women and children, strengthen the overall family unit, and provide valuable resources to families working with the Illinois Department of Children & Family Services.

In step with the settlement house tradition, the agency is also a staunch advocate for social change on local and national levels, addressing issues ranging from immigration reform to early childhood education to affordable housing and community development.

== Leadership, Staff and Structure ==
Governed by a board of directors, Erie House exhibits a leadership structure that is typical for a mid-sized nonprofit organization: its administration includes an executive director, a senior leadership team, and staff of key program directors and supervisors.

Kirstin Chernawsky is the executive director at Erie Neighborhood House. She is the ninth individual to serve in this role since the agency's incorporation in 1915, having succeeded Celena Roldán in March 2016.

With an annual budget of approximately $8M, the organization employs a diverse workforce of 150 full- and part-time employees. Its programs operate on a blend of federal, state and private foundation funding. The organization also relies on a generous donor base in addition to an active volunteer corps.

== Recognition/accomplishments ==
- Midwest Affiliate of the Year NCLR (2016, 2015)
- Family Strengthening Award, NCLR (2014)
- Accredited Charity, BBB (2014)
- Top 25 Hispanic Nonprofit, Hispanic Business (2007)
- Non-Profit Community Building Award, Chicago Neighborhood Development Awards (2005)
