= Brian Peterson =

Brian Peterson may refer to:

- Brian Peterson (soccer) (1936–2020), South African former footballer
- Brian Wayne Peterson (born 1971/2), American screenwriter and television producer
- Brian C. Peterson, American convicted of manslaughter in 1998

== See also ==
- Bryan Petersen (born 1986), baseball player
- Bryan Petersen (basketball), American basketball coach
