= Charles S. Peterson =

American historian (1927–2017)

Charles S. "Chas" Peterson (January 30, 1927 – May 10, 2017) was an American historian. A member of the Church of Jesus Christ of Latter-day Saints (LDS Church) and a resident of Utah most of his life, he specialized in the history of his state and of the people of the LDS Church.

== Biography ==
Peterson was born in Snowflake, Arizona in 1927. Born into a Latter-day Saint family, he served in the U.S. Army (1945–46) and served on a church mission to Sweden (1947–49), where he worked with Ezra Taft Benson. Upon the completion of his mission, he studied at Brigham Young University, graduating with a BA in 1953, the year of his marriage to Elizabeth "Betty" Hayes. The couple had six children while Peterson continued his studies, earning an MA (BYU, 1958) and a PhD (University of Utah, 1967).

Peterson became a college-level teacher of Utah history, the director of the Utah State Historical Society, and the editor of the Society's Utah Historical Quarterly. He was the author of Utah: A Bicentennial History, a sociopolitical history of Utah published in 1977. He died in St. George, Utah in 2017.
