= Ivan Peterson =

American veterinarian (1917–1967)

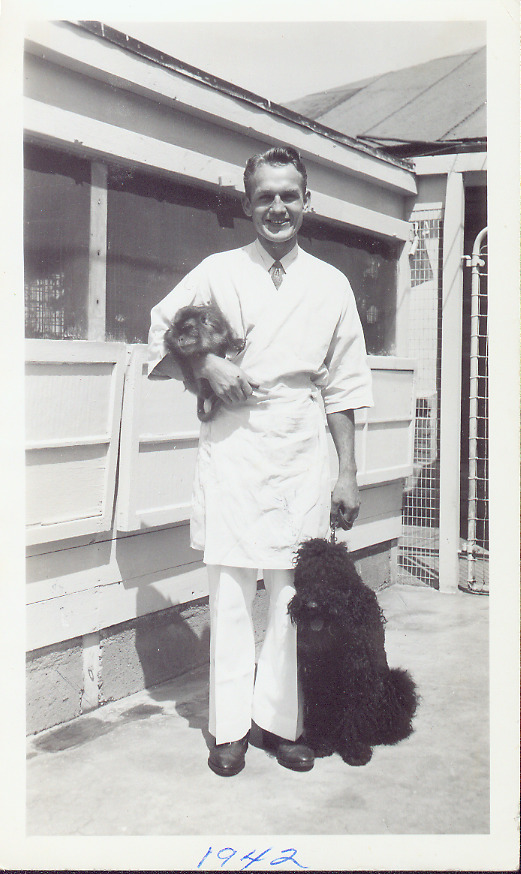
- Ivan Peterson DVM 1942 at his veterinary clinic
- Born: Ivan Allen Peterson; 29 August 1917; Forks, Washington, U.S.
- Died: 16 September 1967 (aged 50); Pasadena, California, U.S.
- Occupation: Veterinarian
- Spouse: Mary Jane Weidenbacker Daniel (m. 1943)
- Children: 3; Ivan Allen Peterson II, Christopher Nels Peterson and Deborah Joanne Peterson

Dr. Ivan Allen Peterson, DVM (1917–1967) was a veterinarian in the San Marino, Pasadena and Hollywood areas of Los Angeles County, California, from the late 1940s to the 1960s. He is the son of Oscar Allen Peterson and Minnie Peterson born as Minnie Wilhelmina Nelson and later known as "The Packer" (of Forks, Washington). He was married to Mary Jane Weidenbacker Daniel. He is most well known for being the veterinarian and adviser for several famous Hollywood pet actors, including several of the dogs who played in the Lassie movies (1954).

In 1951, Peterson was called upon to investigate the condition of the cow residing at the Ames Mansion in Pasadena, which later became known as the Purple Cow House, as the cow became the target for vandals who threw purple paint upon it in a neighbour feud. Peterson found the cow to be in humane conditions and was shown in the Pasadena newspaper sitting next to Bossy giving her a pat. A book written by Mary Ames Mitchell recounts the tale.

He received mention in several articles including Time Magazine, the Star News – Pasadena, The Sikeston Herald, Stars and Stripes and Independent, Long Beach. He was also covered by The Sydney Morning Herald regarding a story wherein his office was broken into and all 30 of his dogs slept soundly while the thief, dubbed "cat burglar" in many popular newspapers, made off with $50.

== Biography ==
Peterson was born in Forks, Washington in 1917 to Swedish farmers and pioneers Oscar Peterson and Minnie Nelson Peterson. His mother is known as "The Packer" in Forks, having led President John F. Kennedy on a packing trip in the 1960s. The Minnie Peterson State Park is named after her on the Hoh River, and she is a notable citizen of Forks. In 1872, his Swedish grandparents emigrated to Forks, Clallum County, Washington, U.S.. His paternal side, the Peterson clan originated from the Village of Ölån in Bäcke, Älvsborg, Sweden and his maternal side, the Nelson's from Linderöd, Kristianstad, Skåne, Sweden.

== Education ==
He attended Washington State University in Pullman, Washington, U.S. from 1939 to 1942, and graduated with honors for his Doctorate in Veterinary Medicine in '42. He was a member of Alpha Tau Omega social fraternity and the Crimson Circle, an honorary for outstanding upper classmen. He also was President of the Sphinx Club at WSU in 1939, with a full page on the yearbook. He joined the Junior American Veterinary Association in 1942 in Washington.

== Career ==
Later, on October 23, 1953, as Alumni President, Dr. Peterson hosted a Washington State Alumni banquet for those alumni who had moved to California, during the weekend of a WSC - UCLA game in Los Angeles, California. This Alumni banquet was also hosted by Dr. Myron A. Thom and Dr. Marvin Gilberg, both whom attended WSU. Dr. Myron Thom graduated in '29 and became a veterinary surgeon in Pasadena, whom Peterson worked with. Peterson's opened his own veterinary clinic in 1957 at 28 Valley Street, in Pasadena.

== Personal life ==
In 1943, he moved to California and married his college sweetheart, Mary Jane, in Pasadena, California, where the family set up residence. They lived at 1100 Kewen Drive in San Marino, California from 1951 to 1953 and also in San Marino and at 2285 Huntley Circle from 1953 to 1967.
