= Jerome Peterson =

Jerome Peterson may refer to:

- Jerome B. Peterson (1859–1943), American newspaper editor and diplomat
- Jerome P. Peterson (1936–2018), American educator and politician

== See also ==
- John Peterson (disambiguation)
- Jack Peterson (disambiguation)
