= Andy Peterson =

American college football coach

Current position
- Title: Defensive backs coach, strength and conditioning coach
- Team: Olivet Nazarene
- Conference: MSFA

Playing career

Football
- 1999–2002: Maranatha Baptist
- 2004–2005: RiverCity Rage
- Positions: Linebacker, safety

Coaching career (HC unless noted)

Football
- 2004–2006: Greenville (IL) (DB/S&C)
- 2007–2008: Western Michigan (GA/S&C)
- 2011–2013: Maranatha Baptist Bible
- 2015: Watertown HS (WI) (DB/S&C)
- 2016–present: Olivet Nazarene (DB/S&C)

Wrestling
- 2009–2013: Maranatha Baptist Bible

Andy Peterson is an American college football coach. He is currently an assistant coach at Olivet Nazarene University in Bourbonnais, Illinois. Peterson served the head football coach at Maranatha Baptist Bible College in Watertown, Wisconsin from 2011 to 2013.
