= Arthur Peterson =

Arthur Peterson may refer to:

- Arthur P. Peterson (1858–1895), Hawaiian politician
- Arthur Frederick Peterson (1859–1922), English judge
- Arthur Peterson (actor) (1912–1996), American character performer
- Arthur V. Peterson (1912–2008), American military officer
- Arthur L. Peterson (1926–2023), American educator and politician
- Arthur Peterson (Vermont politician), American legislator elected in 2020
- Arthur Peterson (civil servant) (1916–1986), British civil servant
