= Minnie Peterson =

- Born: Minnie Wilhelmina Nelson; November 16, 1897; Hoko, Washington, U.S.
- Died: January 6, 1989 (aged 91); Forks, Washington, U.S.
- Occupations: Packer; Guide; Outfitter
- Spouse: Oscar Allen Peterson (m. 1915)
- Children: 4; Vivian Irene Peterson, Ivan Peterson, Oscar Clarence Peterson and Carma Leota Peterson

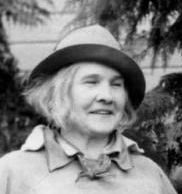
Minnie Peterson 1960 Forks, Washington

Minnie Peterson was born in 1897 in Hoko, Washington, U.S. to Swedish emigrant parents, Nels Nelson and Sofia Jönsdotter, who came to settle and pioneer land in Clallam County, Washington State. Nels emigrated from Linderöd, Kristianstad, Skåne, Sweden in 1888 and Sofia from Snogeröd, Gudmuntorp, Skåne, Sweden in 1895. The couple married in Seattle, Washington in 1895, two years before Minnie was born.

Minnie later would become known as "The Packer" throughout the Olympic Peninsula and Hoh River, where she lived off the land and worked for over 50 years as a guide (1927–1978), outfitter and notable packer for trips into the high Olympics wilderness of the Peninsula. A campground in her namesake, the Minnie Peterson Camp and Picnic Area, resides along the Hoh River nine miles south of the town of Forks, on Upper Hoh Road.

In Minnie's published biography High Divide, she is described as a "tempered-steel character loved by some, admired by most and respected by all".

== Biography ==
Born in Forks, Washington State in 1897, on a ranch along the Hoko River near Lake Ozette. From an early age, she learned how to work the ranch livestock, horse riding and handling, and to care for the land.

In 1915, she married Oscar Peterson Sr., who was also a child of Swedish emigrant parents. Her published biography, High Divide, recounts Minnie and her husband rode a motorcycle from Forks, Washington to San Francisco, California on their honeymoon. Upon returning to Forks, Minnie embarked on her lifelong career as a packer when her husband asked if she would help with the pack horses during hunting season. She often would take to leading trails of horses through the Peninsula wilderness for days, with her four small children. She and husband Oscar bought a string of pack horses and led trips for the Sierra Club, scientists and other individuals including President John F. Kennedy. Minnie continued running the couple's ranch after her husband's death in 1962. She continued her packing trips until 1978, when her last trip was at the age of 80.

Minnie's great-granddaughter, Anna Matsche, is guiding trips on the Hoh River a century later, and assisted Minnie with a float trip of 40 Boy Scouts down the river, wherein details of the trip and Minnie's "Pioneer Spirit" are referenced in a news article.

Stories written about Minnie Peterson in the Seattle Times, (Olympic) Peninsula Magazine, the Western Horseman and other publications tell how she often ignored warnings of bears. During one notable camping trip, Peterson camped near two concerned hikers, who had been advised a bear was in the area and they were concerned for their safety. Peterson offered to sleep by the door to ward off any intruders. Later that night, a bear showed at the camp. The story published in Peninsula Daily News Magazine recounts the tale of how the bear came up to the camp, then Minnie Peterson chased it off until it changed its mind and ran straight at her. Peterson quoted before the bear turned away for the second time, she felt it brush her leg.

Minnie's grandson, Gary Peterson, and his wife Charlotte, live on her homestead. They run a quaint retail store named Peak 6, containing many books, tributes, photographs and history of Minnie Peterson "the Packer". The store itself sits at the forefront of the 280-acres once owned by Minnie. Minnie often bought land at a good price, leaving her heirs in 1992 with 450-acres of land.
