= Trial of Scot Peterson =

Trial of American police officer

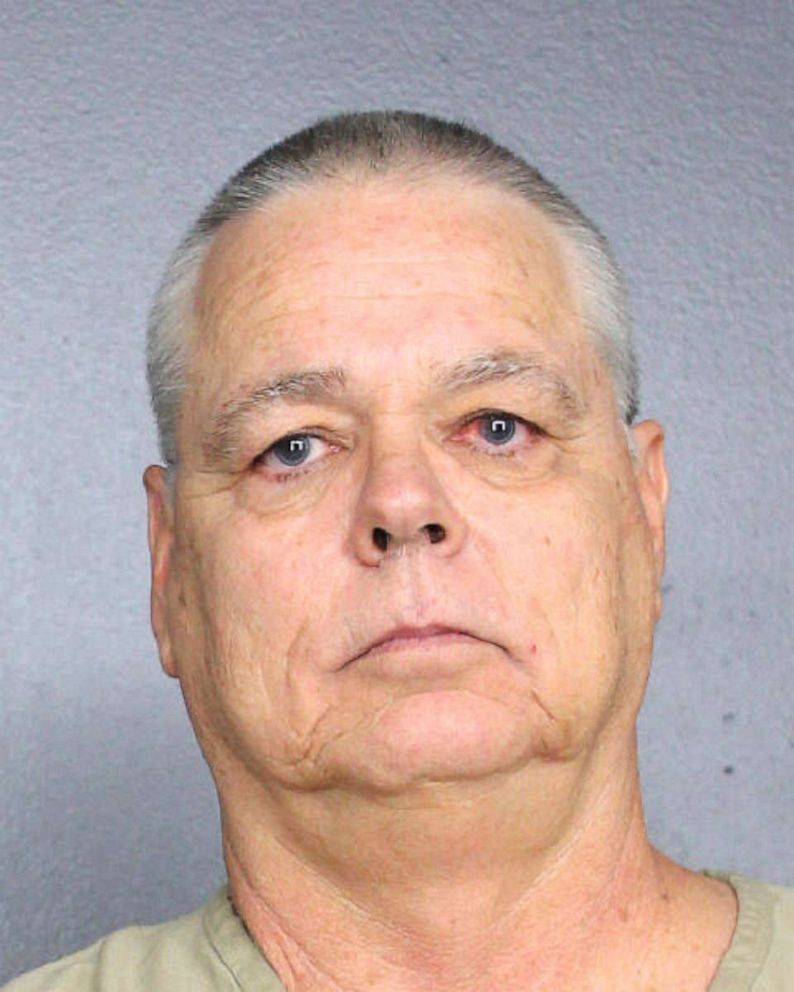
Mug shot of Peterson on June 4, 2019

During the Parkland high school shooting on February 14, 2018, at Marjory Stoneman Douglas High School in the suburban town of Parkland in Broward County, Florida, Scot Ralph Peterson (born April 26, 1963) arrived on the scene as the school’s Broward County school resource officer, and he remained outside the building while the incident took place. Seventeen people were killed and another 17 were injured in the shooting, and the shooter, Nikolas Cruz, was able to flee from the scene without being apprehended until more than an hour later. The shooting is the deadliest mass shooting at a high school in U.S. history. In the aftermath of the shooting, Peterson was strongly criticized for not entering the building to pursue and engage with the shooter, but he later said that at the time he thought the shooter was outside of the building.

In 2023, Peterson was tried for multiple alleged crimes including felony child neglect and culpable negligence in relation to his inaction during the school shooting. Before the trial, commentators had stated that a guilty verdict in his trial might have set a precedent for the legal status of policing in the United States. It was the first time in the U.S. where a law enforcement officer was charged with failing to pursue and engage with a shooter during an on-campus shooting. On June 29, 2023, Peterson was acquitted on all charges.

== Background ==
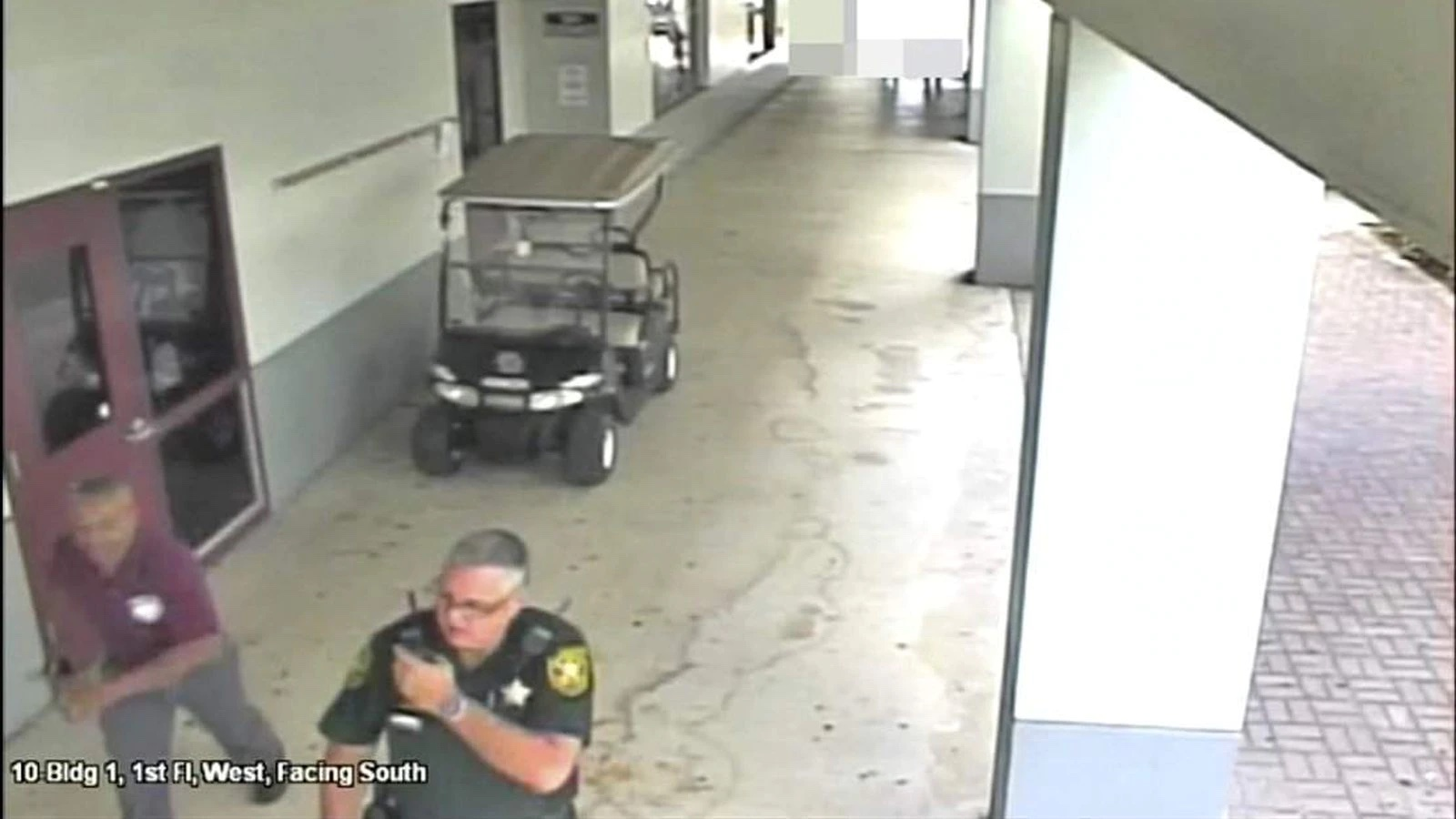
Peterson outside Marjory Stoneman Douglas High School during the 2018 shooting

SRO Peterson, who was armed, on-site and in uniform as a Broward Sheriff's Office deputy, remaining outside Building 12 during the shooting. Eight days after the attack, he was suspended without pay by Sheriff Israel, and he immediately retired. Sheriff Israel said "Scot Peterson was absolutely on campus for this entire event", and that he should have "gone in, addressed the killer, [and] killed the killer".

A statement released by Peterson's lawyer before he was charged said that Peterson believed the shooting was happening outside the building. According to the lawyer, Peterson claimed he told this to the first Coral Springs police officer who arrived on scene. The statement also pointed to radio transmissions that indicated a gunshot victim near the football field.

The Miami Herald transcribed radio dispatches that Peterson said at 2:23 during the shooting, "Be advised we have possible, could be firecrackers. I think we have shots fired, possible shots fired—1200 building." Seconds later, Peterson radioed: "We're talking about the 1200 building; it's going to be the building off Holmberg Road. Get the school locked down, gentlemen!" At 2:25, he radioed that "We also heard it's by—inside the 1200." At an unspecified time, Peterson called for police to ensure that "no one comes inside the school". At 2:27, at Building 12, he radioed, "Stay at least 500 feet away at this point." At an unspecified time, Peterson ordered: "Do not approach the 12– or 1300 building; stay at least 500 feet away."

On March 15, the sheriff's office released video footage in compliance with a court order. The video was captured by school surveillance cameras and showed some of Peterson's movements during the shooting.

== Legal proceedings ==
In June 2019, following an investigation that included interviews with 184 witnesses, Peterson was arrested and then bonded out for the crime of failing to protect the students during the shooting. In June 2023, Peterson was tried in court on multiple charges regarding the events related to the shooting. He faced 11 charges, including multiple counts of neglect of a child and culpable negligence, and one count of perjury.

In 2019, Peterson had pleaded not guilty and filed a motion to have all charges dropped. However, the motion was denied and jury selection started on May 31, 2023. On June 29, 2023, after four days of deliberations, jurors acquitted Peterson on all counts.

In July 2023, a judge approved for a re-enactment of the shooting to be conducted inside the building as part of a civil lawsuit against Peterson. The re-enactment was going be recorded to be reviewed by the court and was planned to include the same type of weapons and ammo used, but with blanks instead of live ammunition. However, live ammunition ended up being used instead.

Peterson's legal team requested that the lawsuit brought against him by the surviving victims and the deceased victims' families be dismissed in December 2023. In January 2024, the judge declared that the lawsuits against Peterson could move forward. Peterson appealed the decision; a year later, in January 2025, a judge upheld the decision to allow the lawsuits to go to trial.

== Response ==
Some commentators had previously stated that a guilty verdict in the trial might have set precedent for the legal status of policing in the United States by determining the legal interpretation of the term "caregiver" to include police officers under some circumstances. Other commentators were skeptical about this theory. In the end, this issue was never opened because of Peterson's acquittal.

Parents of victims of the shooting were disappointed with the decision of the jury that acquitted Peterson and condemned his actions during the incident. Some called Peterson a "failure" and "the coward of Broward" while others expressed their concern that he was acquitted and felt that school resource officers should be held accountable for failing to engage threats.

== See also ==
- Uvalde school shooting, another incident involving inaction of law enforcement officers during a school shooting, after which one officer was acquitted similarly to Peterson
