= Douglas Peterson =

Douglas or Doug Peterson may refer to:

- Douglas L. Peterson, American businessman
- Doug Peterson (yacht designer) (1945–2017), American yacht designer
- D. J. Peterson (baseball) (Douglas Anthony Peterson, born 1991), American baseball player
- Doug Peterson (Nebraska politician) (born 1959), American lawyer and politician in Nebraska
- Doug Peterson (Minnesota politician) (born 1948), American politician, member of the Minnesota House of Representatives
- Doug Peterson (cross-country skier) (born 1953), American cross-country skier
- Pete Peterson (Douglas Brian Peterson, born 1935), American politician and diplomat

== See also ==
- Douglas W. Petersen (1948–2014), American politician in Massachusetts
- Doug Pederson (born 1968), American football coach
