= List of settlement houses in Chicago =

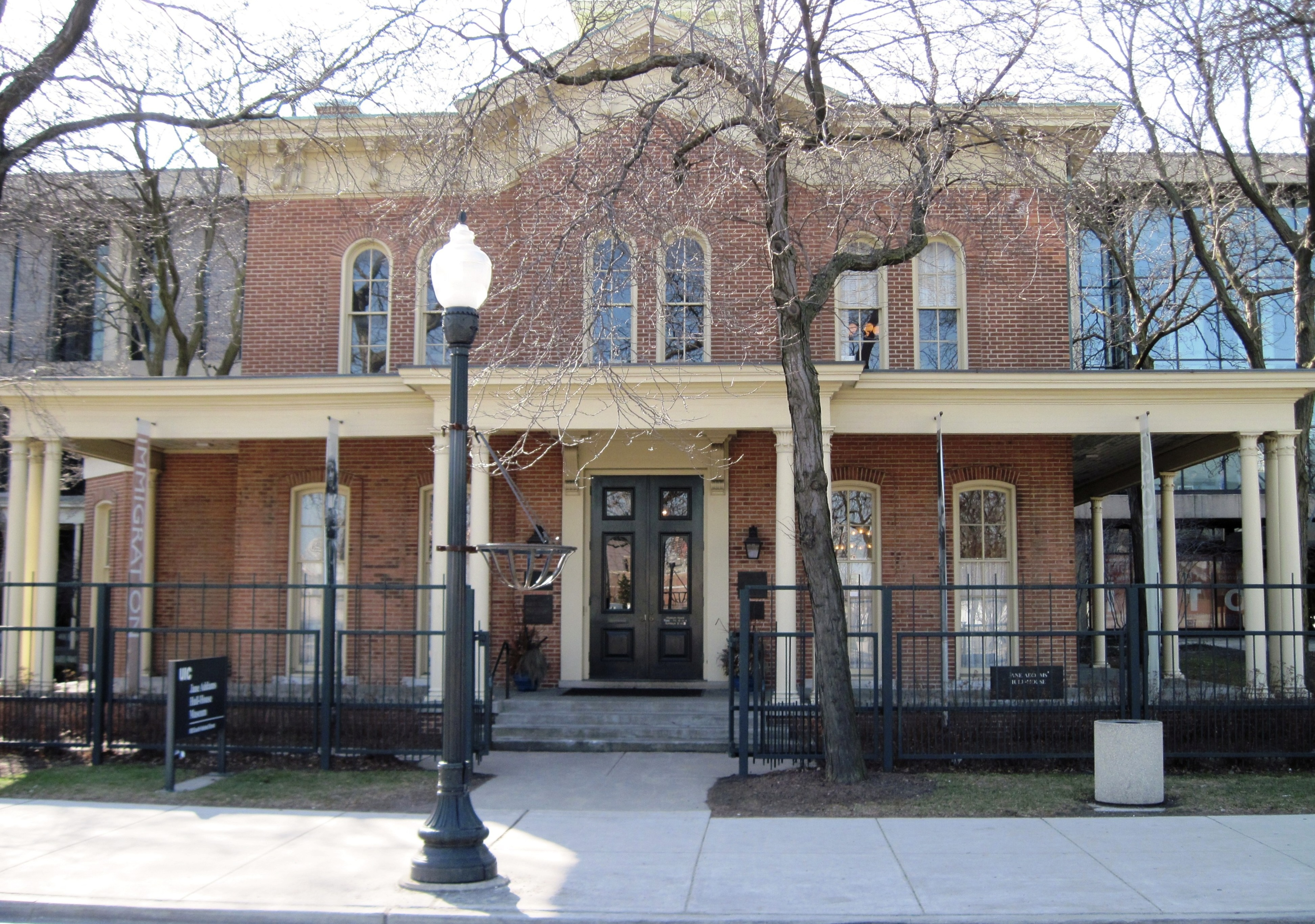
Hull House, the first settlement house in Chicago.

This is a list of settlement houses in Chicago.

Settlement houses, which reached their peak popularity in the early 20th century, were marked by a residential approach to social work: the social workers ("residents") would live in the settlement house, and thus be a part of the same communities as the people they served. The movement began in England in 1884 but quickly spread; the first settlement house in Chicago was Hull House, founded in 1889.

By 1911, Chicago's neighborhoods boasted dozens of settlement houses, but in the course of the 20th century most of these closed. Some, however, remain in operation as social service agencies today, although most no longer follow the residential model. Some also merged into other organizations; for example, the Chicago Commons Association absorbed a number of settlement houses including Chicago Commons itself, the Olivet Institute, and the University of Chicago Settlement. Modern-day institutions that are or once were settlement houses include the Northwestern University Settlement House on the Near North Side and Benton House in Bridgeport.

The scope of this list includes any institution in Chicago that functioned as a settlement house at one time, even if it subsequently ceased to follow the settlements' residential model. Some addresses are based on sources prior to the 1910s, and may thus reflect older street-numbering systems and not correspond to the address the structure would have today.

== List ==
Name	Also known as	Location(s)	Founder(s)	Establishment	Disestablishment	Affiliations
Abraham Lincoln Centre	Abraham Lincoln Center	Oakwood Boulevard & Langley (original) 3858 S. Cottage Grove (current)	Jenkin Lloyd Jones	1905	Still operating	Originally affiliated with the All Souls Unitarian Church
Archer Road Settlement	Francis E. Clark Settlement (1903-1910)	250 W 22nd (1909-)	Charles W. Espey, Will La Favor	1903		
Association House of Chicago	YWCA Settlement	2150 W North	North Side YWCA	1899	Still operating	
Benton House	Providence Day Nursery (1907-1916) House of Happiness (1916-1942)	3052 S. Gratten	Janett Sturges	1907	Still operating	
Central Settlement		1409 Wabash	C.A. Kelly	1903		Open Church Methodist
Charles Sumner Settlement		1951 W Fulton	W.T. Sumner, Frank K. Sadler	1908		
Chase House	Chase Neighborhood House	637 W 43rd		1907		St. Paul's Episcopal Church
Chicago Commons		Grand & Morgan (1901-1948)	Graham Taylor	1894	Still operating (as citywide association)	
Chicago Hebrew Institute		1258 W Taylor		1906		
Christopher House		1528 East Fullerton (1906-1910) 1616-18 W. Fullerton (1910-) 2507 N Greenview (1918-) 4701 North Winthrop Ave (1994–present) 3255 West Altgeld St (2007–present) 5235 West Belden Ave (2013–present)		1906	Still operating as a family of schools providing a continuum of education, from birth through the eighth grade, paired with immersive support for the whole family.	First Presbyterian Church of Evanston
Clybourn Avenue Settlement		245 Clybourn	David Swing	1893	a. 1900	Presbyterian Home Mission Board (1893-1897)
Eli Bates House	Elm Street Settlement, Unity Settlement	621 Elm		1895		Unity Church
Emanuel Settlement		2732 W Armour	Dr. Fannie Emanuel	1908		
Emerson House		1802 Emerson (various subsequent locations)		1910	1948: Merged with Chicago Commons	
Esther Falkenstein Settlement	Settlement House of Armitage Avenue	1917 N. Humboldt (1908-)	Esther Falkenstein	1900		
Fellowship House	Helen Heath Settlement (1895-1904)	831 W 33rd Place		1895		All Souls Unitarian Church (1895-1904)
Forward Movement	Epworth House	Monroe & Loomis	Rev. George W. Gray	1893		Methodist Episcopal Church (1893-1896)
Frederick Douglass Center		3032 Wabash	Celia Parker Woolley	1904		
Gads Hill Center	Gads Hill Social Settlement (1898-1916)	1959 W. 20th (1909-) 1919 W. Cullerton (present)	Leila A. Martin	1898	Still operating	
Halsted Street Institutional Church Social Center		Halsted & 20th		1903		
Henry Booth House		701 W 14th Place	William Mackintire Salter	1898		Ethical Culture Society
Hull House	Hull-House	800 S. Halsted	Jane Addams, Ellen Gates Starr	1889	2012: filed for bankruptcy.	
Hyde Park Center		5643 S Lake	Hyde Park Juvenile Protection League	1909		
Institutional Church and Social Settlement	Dearborn Center	3825 S Dearborn		1900		African Methodist Episcopal Church
Kirkland School Settlement		219 Indiana	Elizabeth Kirkland	1896	1897	Kirkland School
Madonna Center	Guardian Angel Mission (1898-1922)		Agnes Ward Amberg	1898	1962	Roman Catholic Church
Maxwell Street Settlement		1214 S Clinton	Jacob Abt, Jesse Lowenhaupt	1893		
Medical Missionary College Settlement				1895	a. 1900	American Medical Missionary College
Mutual Benefit House	Girls' Club	531 W Superior		1897		
Neighborhood Guild		2512 Wentworth		1906		Christ Reformed Episcopal Church
Neighborhood House		6710 May (1906-)	Harriet Van Der Vaart	1907		Universalist Church of Englewood (1897-1900)
Northwestern University Settlement House		Augusta & Noble (1901–present)	Henry Wade Rogers, Charles Zueblin, et al.	1891	Still operating	
Olivet Community Center	Olivet Institute	Vedder & Penn	Norman Barr	1898	1966/1967: merged with Chicago Commons	Presbyterian Church
Onward Neighborhood House	Onward Presbyterian Church	Ohio & Leavitt (1893-2017) 5423 W Diversey Ave (2017–present)	Mission Sunday School (Hoyne and Grand Ave)	1893	Still operating	
Rouse Settlement		3213 Wallace		1898		Trinity Episcopal Church
South Deering Neighborhood Center		10441 S Hoxie	Harriet Mitchell, Mrs. Alex Natanson	1907		
South End Center		3212 91st	Grace Darling	1907		
South Side Settlement	Ada S. McKinley Community Services		Ada S. McKinley	1919	Still operating	
St. Elizabeth Settlement		317 Orleans		1893		Roman Catholic Church
St. Mary's Settlement		656 W 44th				Roman Catholic Church
Union Avenue Parish House	G.F. Swift Memorial	4356 Union Avenue		1906		Methodist Church
University of Chicago Settlement	Mary McDowell Settlement House	4630 Gross Avenue (1905-)	Mary McDowell	1894	1966/1967: merged with Chicago Commons	Christian Union of the University of Chicago
Wentworth Neighborhood Center		Wentworth & 43rd Pl.	Lillie Anna Pfeiffer	1909		

== Works cited ==
- Rima Lunin Schulz; Adele Hast, eds. (1990). Women Building Chicago, 1790-1990. Indiana University Press. ISBN 0253338522.
- Montgomery, Caroline Williamson (1900). Bibliography of college, social, university and church settlements (4th ed.). College Settlements Association.
- Raymond, Josephine Hunt (1897). The Social Settlement Movement in Chicago. University of Wisconsin-Madison.
- Spain, Daphne (2001). How Women Saved the City. University of Minnesota Press. ISBN 0816635323.
- Woods, Robert A.; Kennedy, Albert J. (1911). Handbook of Settlements (1970 reprint ed.). Russell Sage Foundation. ISBN 040502486X.

== See also ==
- Settlement house
