= Harriet Van Der Vaart =

American reformer (1853–1935)

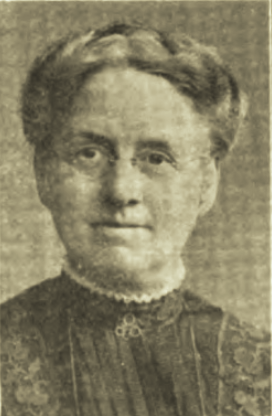
- Van Der Vaart, from a 1910 publication
- Born: Harriet Eliza Merriam; April 24, 1853; Wisconsin, U.S.
- Died: July 16, 1935 (aged 82); Minneapolis, Minnesota, U.S.
- Occupations: Social worker, reformer, clubwoman, settlement worker, lecturer

Harriet Eliza Merriam Van Der Vaart (April 24, 1853 – July 16, 1935) was an American clubwoman, suffragist, and settlement worker. She worked for child welfare and opened Neighborhood House, a settlement house in Chicago.

== Biography ==
Merriam was born in Wisconsin, the daughter of Horace Merriam and Eliza Wright Merriam. Her father was a lawyer from Maine; her mother was born in Canada.

Van Der Vaart was vice-chair of the industrial committee of the General Federation of Women's Clubs, head of the immigrant department of the Women's Trade Union League (WTUL), and secretary of the Illinois Child Labor Committee. She was founder and head resident of the Neighborhood House settlement, president of the Neighborhood House Association, and active in the Neighborhood House Woman's Club. She lectured to community groups on child labor and education topics. She attended the International Woman Suffrage Alliance meeting in Amsterdam in 1908.

Merriam married Samuel S. Van Der Vaart, who joined her in settlement work at Neighborhood House. Anna E. Nicholes and her sister S. Grace Nicholes also lived at the settlement. They sold Neighborhood House in 1922, "feeling that it had accomplished its purpose", after the deaths of Anna Nicholes and S. S. Van Der Vaart.

She died in 1935, at age 82, in Minneapolis.

== Publications ==
- "Children in the Glass Works of Illinois" (1907)
- "Illinois Child Labor Committee" (1910)
