= Nicholes =

Nicholes is a surname.

- Anna E. Nicholes
- S. Grace Nicholes

== See also ==
- Charlie Nicholes Holmberg
