= Chicago Commons =

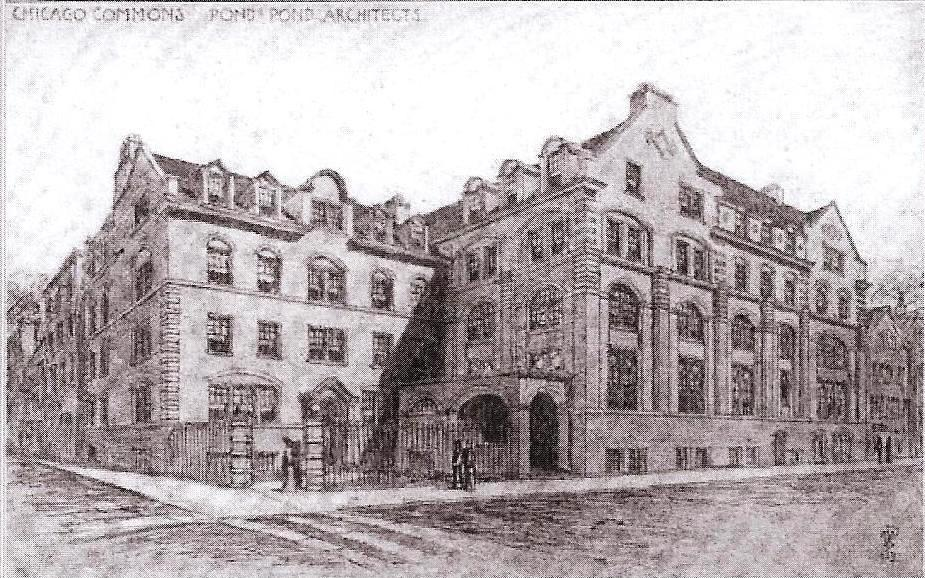
1899 drawing of the new Chicago Commons building, opened in 1901

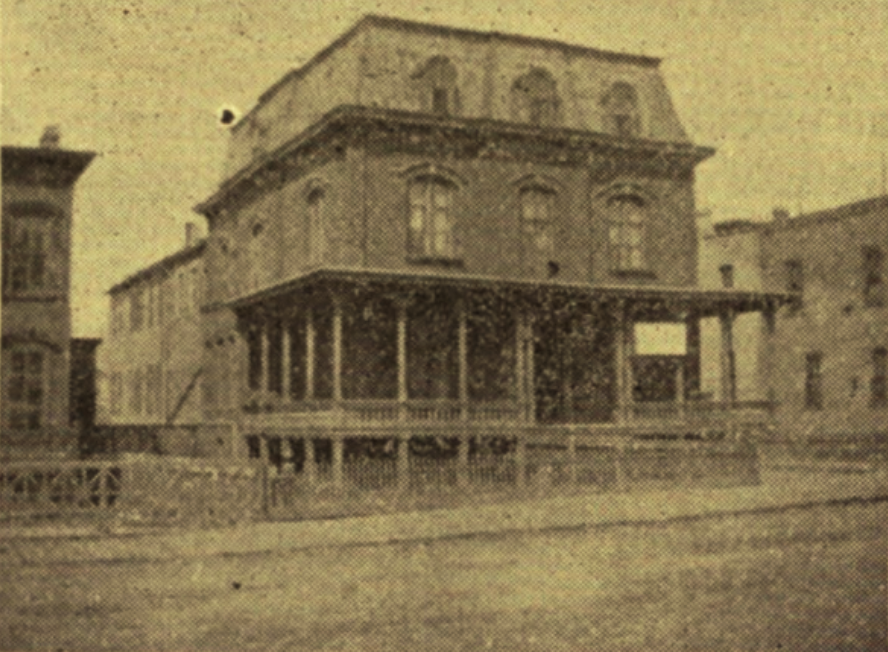
Chicago Commons building (1897)

Chicago Commons, known since 1954 as the Chicago Commons Association, is a social service organization and former settlement house in Chicago, Illinois, in the United States. Originally located on the near Northwest Side and now headquartered in Chicago's Bronzeville neighborhood, it serves underresourced communities throughout the city.

For the first six decades of its existence, Chicago Commons was a settlement house patterned on Jane Addams' Hull House, with a group of resident social workers. Throughout this period, it was headed by the Taylor family, father Graham Taylor (head resident 1894–1922) and daughter Lea Demarest Taylor (head resident 1922–1954). Subsequently, it sold its original settlement house and shifted to a more conventional social service model, merging with several other former settlement houses to create a citywide organization.

== Chicago Commons settlement house ==
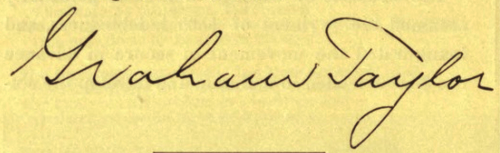
Graham Taylor signature

Five years of faith and free-will have these been, of struggle and patience and loyal fellowship, in the uncompelled attempt to live a normal life of human service in that part of the great city where we seem to be most needed, rather than where the neighborhood seems to offer the most of social prestige or of privilege.

— Graham Taylor, 1900

The founder of Chicago Commons, Graham Taylor, followed the model of Hull House in his settlement work. Taylor was a professor of "applied Christianity" at the Chicago Theological Seminary. He established the settlement in 1894, in a poor immigrant neighborhood a short distance northwest of downtown, and moved there with his wife and four children in 1895.

In his academic career, Taylor specialized in training for social work, founding the University of Chicago School of Social Service Administration in 1903. He had originally envisioned the Chicago Commons as a sort of field laboratory for research and training in social work, but this quickly gave way to a broader conception of the settlement's obligations to the community. The settlement aligned itself with the labor movement, and adopted "industrial and social democracy" as a guiding principle.

The Taylors were soon joined by others, and the settlement boasted 22 adult residents by 1900. They expanded to a five-story building located on Grand Avenue at Morgan Street in 1901. Like Hull House and the Northwestern University Settlement House, the building was designed by noted Arts and Crafts movement architects Pond & Pond.

During World War I, the settlement house operated a draft board. Residents worked to keep local immigrants apprised of their draft obligations and induction policies.

In 1922, Graham Taylor was succeeded in the directorship by his eldest daughter, Lea Demarest Taylor, who had been a resident of the settlement since the age of 11. She remained head resident for the remainder of Chicago Commons' existence as a settlement house.

Lea Taylor introduced changes in the programs offered by the settlement house in response to the changing makeup of the neighborhood, as Mexican immigrants arrived in the 1930s and African Americans in the 1940s. During the racial strife of the 1940s, the settlement resisted local calls for segregation, insisting on keeping the settlement's services, including camping and club programs, open to both races.

== Chicago Commons Association ==
The Chicago Commons Association was formed by merging Emerson House, another settlement located eight blocks to the west, with Chicago Commons to create a citywide service organization, in 1948. The decision was prompted by city plans to build the Kennedy Expressway through the neighborhood it served. The new association changed its approach, establishing community centers but eliminating the residency component which had marked the original settlement houses. The first such centers were established with the proceeds of the sale of the Chicago Commons building on Grand Avenue. The association also changed leadership, with Bill Brueckner succeeding Lea Demarest Taylor.

The association steadily expanded its offerings through the 20th century, opening a center in Bucktown in 1958, and one at the Henry Horner Homes in 1965. It absorbed the Olivet Community Center and University of Chicago Settlement in the late 1960s. Additional centers were opened in Englewood in 1980, New City in 1990, West Humboldt Park in 1990, and Back of the Yards in 2001. Commons moved its administrative offices to Bronzeville in 2012.

The association's services include adult day care and child development services; the latter have since 1993 followed the Reggio Emilia approach.

== See also ==
- Hull House
- Northwestern University Settlement House
- List of settlement houses in Chicago
