= Polia =

Polia may refer to:

== People ==
- Mario Polia (born 1947), Italian historian, anthropologist, ethnographer and archaeologist
- Polia Pillin (1909–1992), Polish-American ceramist

== Places ==
- Polia, Calabria, Italy

== Species ==
- Polia (moth), genus of moths of the family Noctuidae
- Polia's shrew, species of mammal in the family Soricidae
