= Harriet Vittum =

American social reformer

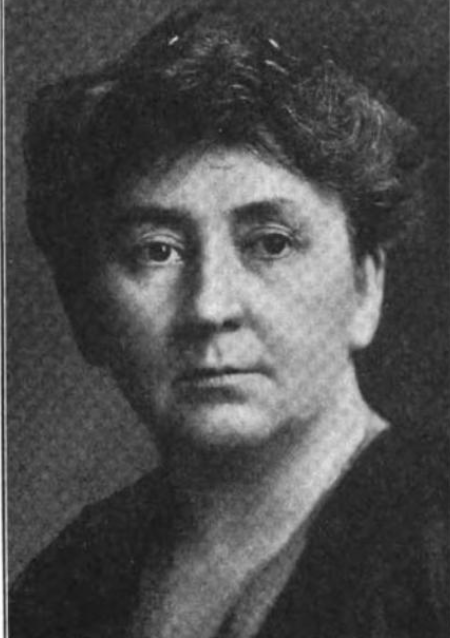
- Harriet E. Vittum, from a 1918 publication
- Born: February 14, 1872; Canton, Illinois
- Died: December 16, 1953
- Occupation(s): Social reformer, settlement worker

Harriet Elizabeth Vittum (February 14, 1872 – December 16, 1953) was an American social reformer, especially active in the settlement movement in Chicago.

== Early life ==
Vittum was born in Canton, Illinois, the daughter of George B. Vittum and Delia A. Burrell Vittum. Her father was a merchant, and she had three brothers.

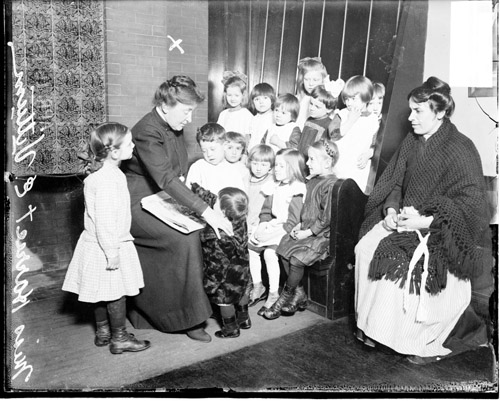
Harriet E. Vittum (with book on lap) with children at the Northwestern University settlement house in 1914; from the Library of Congress

== Career ==
Vittum had social reform interests from an early age, as evidenced when she opened a clinic in her family's home in Canton. She moved to Chicago in 1893, initially to work at the Illinois pavilion at the World's Columbian Exposition, and later working with the Illinois Children's Aid Society. She started a milk station for infants, and worked for school nurses, playgrounds, night school classes, and summer camps. Vittum was head resident of the Northwestern University Settlement. She was active in the suffrage movement, civic director of the Woman's City Club, and president of the Chicago Kindergarten Institute.

In 1914, Vittum ran for alderman in Chicago's 17th ward. She also ran for a seat on the Cook County Board of Commissioners. In 1915, she was elected mayor of Eleanor Model City, a civics project of the Eleanor Association of Chicago. In 1918, she debated Clarence Darrow on the topic of film censorship, noting "I believe that motion pictures ought to be an important educational and social asset." She was a friend to Black social worker Ada S. McKinley; they marched together and gave joint lectures. She worked on the presidential campaigns of Charles Evans Hughes in 1916, and Leonard Wood in 1920.

Vittum spoke about her work in Chicago at women's groups. "We so-called Americans who have lived here for several generations need to Americanize ourselves," she told an Iowa audience in 1924. "We must remake within ourselves something of the true American spirit before we can make the foreigners who come here see what it means." Eleanor Roosevelt mentioned breakfast with Vittum in a 1938 newspaper column.

In 1940, Vittum was founder and president of Roll Call of American Women, a women's organization opposed to American involvement in World War II; Jessamine Hoagland was the organization's treasurer. During both World War I and World War II, she was director of Illinois' Woman's Committee of the Council of National Defense. She retired from the Northwestern University Settlement in 1947. In 1948, she testified at a joint Congressional hearing on housing, and advocated for improved housing and recreational opportunities in Chicago's Northwest Town neighborhood.

== Publications ==
- "Culture of Family Life from the Social Settlement Standpoint" (1914)
- "Neighborhood Development" (1914)
- "The House and the Delinquent Child" (1917)
- "The Evolution of the Christmas Spirit" (1920)

== Personal life and legacy ==
Vittum lived at the Alexandria Hotel after retiring from the Northwestern University Settlement. She died after a stroke in 1953, aged 81 years. There is a Harriet Elizabeth Vittum Park in Chicago, named in her memory.
