= Neighborhood House (Chicago) =

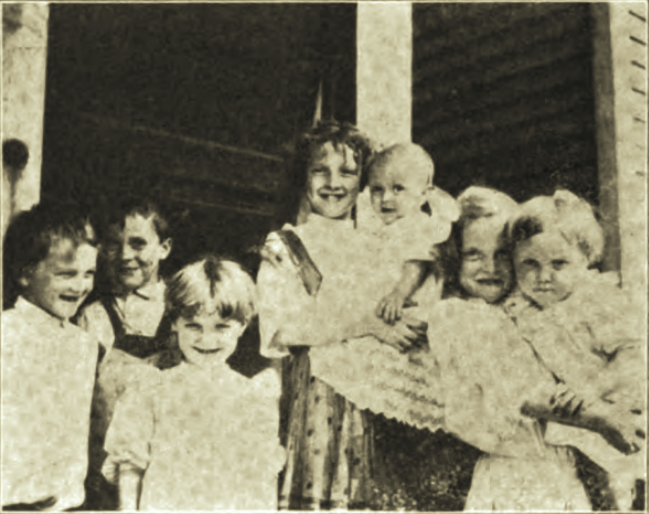
- Formation: 1897
- Founder: Harriet M. Van Der Vaart; Samuel S. Van Der Vaart
- Type: Nonprofit
- Purpose: social reform
- Professional title: Neighborhood House Association
- Headquarters: Englewood, Chicago
- Origins: 1896, Young People's Society of the Universalist Church, of Englewood, Chicago
- Key people: Anna E. Nicholes; S. Grace Nicholes

"To bring together for mutual benefit people of different classes and conditions is declared to be the distinctive purpose of the settlement."

Neighborhood House (from 1903, Neighborhood House Association) was an American settlement house in Chicago, Illinois. It was opened in October 1896, by Samuel S. and Harriet M. Van Der Vaart, under the auspices of the Young People's Society of the Universalist Church, of Englewood, Chicago, (now known as Beverly Unitarian Church) and with the assistance of teachers of the Perkins, Bass, and D. S. Wentworth public schools. It was officially established in the Fall of 1897 by Harriet Van Der Vaart as the outgrowth of the kindergarten opened the year before "to bring together for mutual benefit people of different classes and conditions."

It became independent of the church in 1900. In 1903, it reorganized and incorporated as the Neighborhood House Association, with a board of 25 directors, most of whom lived in the neighborhood, who held title to the property, and largely managed internal affairs. Shares in the buildings of the association were sold in the neighborhood at US$5 each. It was maintained by dues and subscriptions.

The settlement was originally located at 1550 69th Street (1896–99), before relocating to 1224 West 67th Street (67th and May Streets) (1899–1906) and then 6710 May Street (1907-). The neighborhood was tenement district of small houses. The people were of Irish, Dutch, Bohemian and Italian extraction; and were mostly small wage-earners. It had a kindergarten, library, social clubs, industrial school, drawing, choral, manual training and basket weaving classes.

== History ==
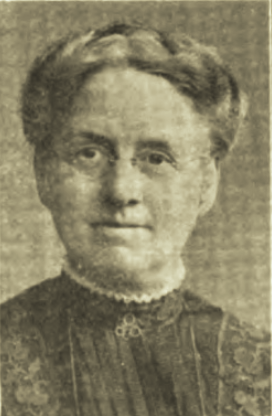
Harriet M. Van Der Vaart, President, Neighborhood House Association

Neighborhood House had its beginning in 1897 when Harriet Van Der Vaart thought to give to the girls of her Sunday School class a chance to be really useful. She hired a small dwelling house and with the help of the girls, started a kindergarten. Then came clubs and classes and parties and with these, the need of more room. From the beginning, Van Der Vaart had the assistance of co-founders, Anna E. Nicholes and her sister, S. Grace Nicholes, women who had a choice between lives of ease and lives of labor, and who chose the latter.

The settlement was organized on guild and cooperative principles. When it became evident in 1906 that there must be a new building, those who were most interested wanted to have it erected through the cooperation of the people of the neighborhood. They had, as a model, Stanton Coit's ideal for neighborhood guilds, which he had partly realized in New York City. They called together their friends in the district with the result that a Neighborhood House Association was formed and a building committee appointed. This committee was somewhat unique. It included a carpenter, a bricklayer, a plumber, and a representative of almost every building trade. When the construction began, therefore, there were experts to criticize every step of the progress. The stock was sold partly in the neighborhood and partly to outsiders, but it was provided that each stockholder should have one vote in the management of the house, and only one, no matter how many shares he took.

== Architecture and fittings ==
The 6710 May Street building was built in 1906 on a gift of four lots, and opened in January 1907. Initial construction of the building on May Street measured 80 by 29 feet (24.4 m × 8.8 m). It had two stories, plainly built of brick. It had fifteen rooms, including a large parlor for small parties and committee meetings, a dining room, reception room, living rooms for the residents, and two smaller clubrooms. The subsequent enlargement in 1909 measured 90 by 126 feet (27 m × 38 m). The part on 67th Street, which at the back adjoined the other section, contained a large auditorium, seating 500, with dressing rooms and a stage. It was a safe place for the young people of the neighborhood to dance and enjoy themselves. On the wall of the auditorium, there was a large map of the district, prepared by the Juvenile Protective League and showing every saloon and dance hall in the neighborhood.

== Activities ==
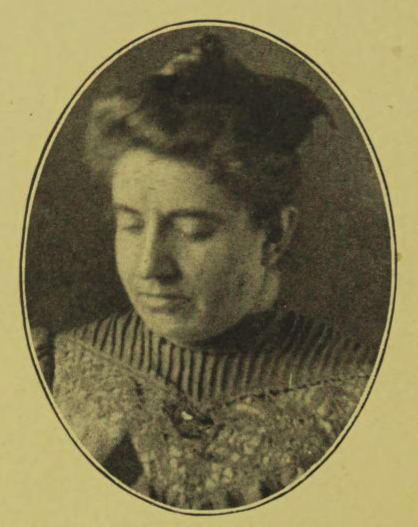
Anna E. Nicholes

The settlement's activities included cooperation with the neighborhood in securing a small park. In cooperation with its public schools, it secured several kindergartens, and a summer manual training school. It provided public library service. The residents were active in the Woman's Trade Union League and the Child Labor Committee. Van Der Vaart, as chair of the industrial committee of the State Federation of Women's Clubs, made a study of working children in Chicago and Cook County, and did much to secure legislation. As secretary of the Consumers' League, she has had opportunity to insist on the enforcement of the same law. Anna Nicholes exerted an effective influence as secretary of the Woman's Trade Union League and editor of the woman's department of the Union Labor Advocate.

The settlement maintained an industrial school and a music school. Nicholes had a class in English for girls who had just gone to work. The purpose was to give them a command of language that would increase their efficiency.

There were clubs for women, young men and women, and children, for literary, dramatic and social ends. The nearby center provided a gymnasium, playground and library facilities. The house secured lectures for the center. Many plays, entertainments, lectures, and socials were performed at Neighborhood House. Summer work included vacation work in co-operation with Fresh Air agencies. There was a free circulating library of 1,000 volumes and a penny savings bank.

The Woman's Club of Neighborhood House always gave US$25 each year for the vacation schools of the city. The Woman'ss Club was affiliated with the Cook County League of Clubs and with the Illinois State Federation of Women's Clubs, to whose annual convention it always sent two delegates and that it had a representative in the Woman's Trade Union League. It had sent two representatives to Springfield, Illinois at the time of the hearing upon the woman's suffrage clause in the Chicago charter.

== Residents ==
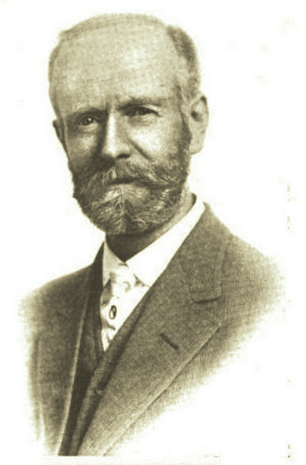
Samuel S. Van Der Vaart

The Van Der Vaarts were a strong factor in the organization and upbuilding of Neighborhood House, which was similar in character to Hull House. In this work, Mr. Van Der Vaart developed some notable achievements for the benefit of the working classes. Reading and lecture rooms, a boys' band, summer outings, annual training, domestic economy, and other practical benefits attracted the children from the streets, as well as the fathers away from the saloons and other objectionable locales, and his work proved to be of material progressive benefit to the community in the district where Neighborhood House was built and where the Van Der Vaarts resided.

As of 1911, there were three women residents, 40 women volunteers, and nine men volunteers. Since 1896, the head resident was Mrs. Van Der Vaart. To Anna Nicholes, the purpose of the settlement seemed to be to bring the neighborhood into touch with the larger life of the city, the state and the nation. To her "being neighborly" seemed to mean not showing other people how to help themselves but helping them to help others.

The residents published several works including:

- Van Der Vaart, Harriet M., "Our Working Children in Illinois". Commons, vii, No. 79 (Feb., 1903).
- Van Der Vaart, Harriet M., "Child Workers at the Holiday Season". Commons, ix : 57–59
- Nicholes, Anna E., "From School to Work. A Study of the Central Office for issuing Child Labor certificates". Reprint from Commons issued by the Illinois Branch of the Consumers' League.
- Nicholes, Anna E., "Votes and Wages for Women". Issued by Illinois Equal Suffrage Association.

== See also ==
- List of settlement houses in Chicago
- Settlement and community houses in the United States
