= Charles Zueblin =

American socioloigst

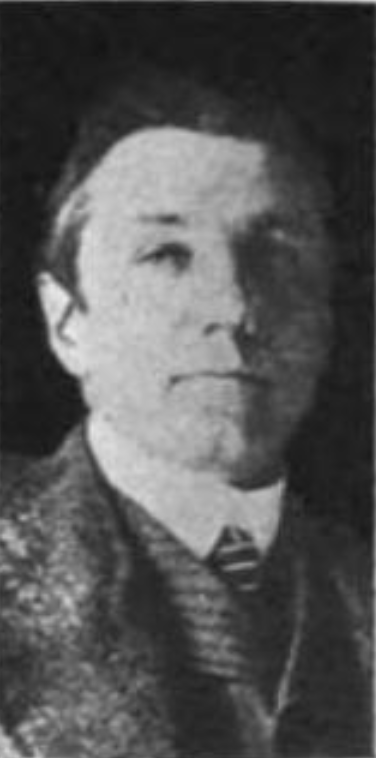
Zueblin in 1906

Charles Newton Zueblin (1866–1924) was an American sociologist and promoter of civic reform.

== Biography ==
Zueblin was born in Pendleton, Indiana on May 4, 1866. He was educated at the University of Pennsylvania, Northwestern University, Yale, and the University of Leipzig.

In 1891, Zueblin founded the Northwestern University Settlement. In 1892, he became the first secretary of the Chicago Society for University Extension. From 1892 to 1895 he was instructor; from 1895 to 1896 assistant professor; from 1896 to 1902 associate professor; and from 1902 to 1908 full professor of sociology at the University of Chicago. From 1911 to 1912, he was editor of the 20th Century Magazine.

Zueblin lectured extensively and contributed frequently to philosophical and sociological journals, and to many of the most prominent magazines and reviews. From 1901 to 1902, he was president of the American League for Civic Improvement; in 1904, the organization would become the American Civic Association.

He was a strong advocate of the commission plan of government and believed every city would eventually adopt the system. In a 1911 interview to The Kansas City Star, Zueblin predicted the system would eventually replace the United States Senate and House of Representatives.

From 1909 to 1922, Zueblin was a resident of Winchester, Massachusetts, with his wife Aurora Fiske Zueblin (1868–1958), daughter Anne and son John. During this time, in addition to his extensive lecturing career, he was put forward by the Progressive Party as a candidate for the Massachusetts Senate (1912). In 1922, the family moved to Switzerland. Zueblin died from a brain hemorrhage while staying in Corsier-Geneva, Switzerland on September 15, 1924.

== Works ==
- American Municipal Progress (1902)
- A Decade of Civic Development (1905)
- The Religion of the Democrat (1908)
- Democracy and the Over-man (1911)
