= Jessamine Hoagland =

American businesswoman

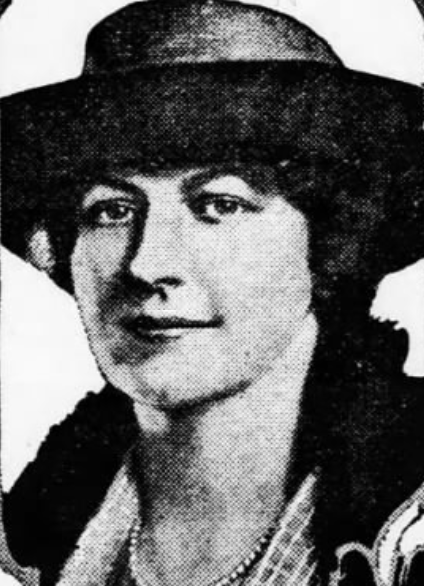
- Jessamine Hoagland, from a 1921 publication
- Born: September 1879; Illinois
- Died: March 11, 1957 (aged 77); Hinckley, Illinois
- Occupation(s): Banker, advertising executive

Jessamine G. Hoagland (September 1879 – March 11, 1957) was an American banker and advertising executive, based in Chicago.

== Career ==
Hoagland was manager of the women's department at Continental and Commercial Trust & Savings Bank in Chicago, then manager of the savings department of the National City Bank of Chicago, and in charge of advertising and publicity for the bank. She was best known for her striking window displays at the bank; for example, she installed a money-counting and wrapping machine in the bank's window, to draw crowds of spectators.

Hoagland left National City Bank of Chicago to open her own advertising business in 1926. She was president of the Women's Advertising Club of Chicago, and the only woman to serve on the executive board of the Associated Advertising Clubs of the World. She was on the board of directors of the Financial Advertisers Association.

Hoagland was treasurer of the Eleanor Association's "Eleanor Model City", a women's citizenship program, in 1915, and a member of the Chicago Political Equality League, a pro-suffrage organization. She was a founder and president of the Federated Council of Business and Professional Women. In 1932 she served on President Hoover's anti-hoarding committee. She wrote Key Women of America (1938). In 1940 and 1941, working with social reformer Harriet Vittum, she was executive vice-president of Roll Call of American Women, a Chicago group opposed to US involvement in World War II.

== Personal life ==
Hoagland died in 1957, aged 77 years, in Hinckley, Illinois.
