= Lea Demarest Taylor =

American settlement house proponent

Lea Demarest Taylor (June 24, 1883 – December 3, 1975) was the head resident of the Chicago Commons, a settlement house in Chicago, Illinois, from 1922 to 1954. Although often overshadowed by her famous father, Graham Taylor, she made significant contributions to the settlement house movement in her own right.

== Early life and education ==
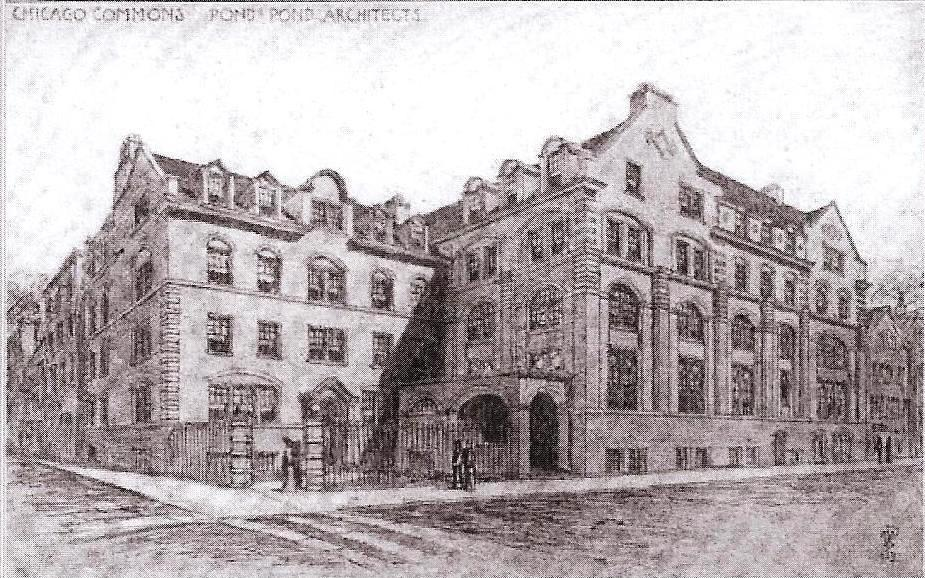
The Chicago Commons building, where Taylor lived for most of her life.

Taylor was the third of four children of Lea Demarest Taylor and Graham Taylor, a minister of the Dutch Reformed Church and professor of applied Christianity. She came to Chicago Commons in 1895, at the age of 11, when her father moved the family into the secular settlement house that he had founded on Chicago's near North Side. The Taylors were the first Chicago family with children to take up residence in a settlement house, and many including Jane Addams expressed concern about the possible risks to the children's health and safety. However, the Taylors persisted, becoming the only family to stay in a settlement house for their children's entire childhood.

In 1901, the settlement moved to a massive 5-story structure at Grand and Morgan, and the family moved with it. Life within the settlement followed a cooperative model, with residents sharing both the social work and the housekeeping tasks; the settlement was devoted to the principle of "industrial and social democracy".

Taylor enrolled at the Lewis Institute, now the Illinois Institute of Technology, at the high school level in 1900. Her social life, however revolved principally around the settlement; she had already been elected a full resident of the settlement in 1899, at the age of 16. She soon continued on to Vassar College, where she graduated in 1904. She did not continue to graduate school, explaining later in life that her work at the settlement "was my graduate education."

During the 1910s Taylor conducted detailed research on the problems facing the neighborhood. In 1917, during World War I, the settlement established a draft board, and Taylor used her position as secretary of the draft board to collect even more information on the local community, which she used for her research in subsequent years. Her experience working with her brother Graham Romeyn Taylor on the causes of the Chicago Race Riot of 1919 spurred a lifelong interest in race relations and racial equality.

== Directorship ==
Taylor took her father's place as head resident at Chicago Commons in 1922. She had in fact already been doing much of the head resident's work for several years, since assuming the role of assistant head resident in 1917.

The 1940s brought an unprecedented challenge for the Chicago Commons, as the movement of African Americans into the neighborhood around the settlement led to violent reactions from the neighborhood's white residents. Taylor resisted calls from the local community for segregation, organizing racially integrated camps and other activities, but was not able to stem the rising tide of animosity. On October 10, 1947, a racially motivated fire left ten African Americans dead and 60 injured in a crowded apartment building a short distance from the settlement. Taylor described it as "the worst disaster in the field of inter-racial warfare that has happened in Chicago". In addition to arranging relief for the victims, she served on the coroner's jury on the fire, which delivered a finding of arson as the cause.

In 1948, as people moved away from the neighborhood due to the impending construction of the Kennedy Expressway, the Chicago Commons Association merged with nearby settlement Emerson House and sold its massive building to raise funds for nonresidential community centers. Taylor ceased to be the head of the Chicago Commons Association at this point, but remained head resident at a short-lived new location further to the northwest. She finally retired from the position of resident in 1954. She moved to Highland Park.

In addition to her work as director and head resident, Taylor was also active in the broader movements of which the Commons were a part. She was a member of the Women's Trade Union League, and worked on legislation establishing a minimum wage in the textile industry. She also served multiple terms as president of the National Federation of Settlements and the Chicago Federation of Settlements. A dedicated advocate of improved housing, she was the first woman to be appointed to the Metropolitan Housing and Planning Council, taking that position in 1934.

== Legacy ==
Chicago Commons, the institution Taylor steered through many decades, is one of only a handful of Chicago settlement houses to remain active in the present day, in the form of the Chicago Commons Association.

In addition, Taylor's name is borne today by the Lea D. Taylor Institute in Chicago, which works on obstacles to social and economic justice in the United States and worldwide.

== Works cited ==
- Allen, Joe (2011). People Wasn't Made to Burn: A True Story of Housing, Race, and Murder in Chicago. Haymarket Books. ISBN 978-1608461264.
- Child, Jeanie F. (1990). "Taylor, Lea Demarest". In Rima Lunin Schulz; Adele Hast (eds.). Women Building Chicago, 1790-1990. Indiana University Press. pp. 868–873. ISBN 0253338522.
- Raymond, Josephine Hunt (1897). The Social Settlement Movement in Chicago. University of Wisconsin-Madison.
- Stebner, Eleanor J.; et al. (2006). "The Settlement House Movement". In Keller (ed.). Encyclopedia of Women and Religion in North America. Vol. 3. Indiana University Press. pp. 1059–1069. ISBN 0253346886.
