= Mary McDowell =

American social reformer (1854–1936)

Mary Eliza McDowell
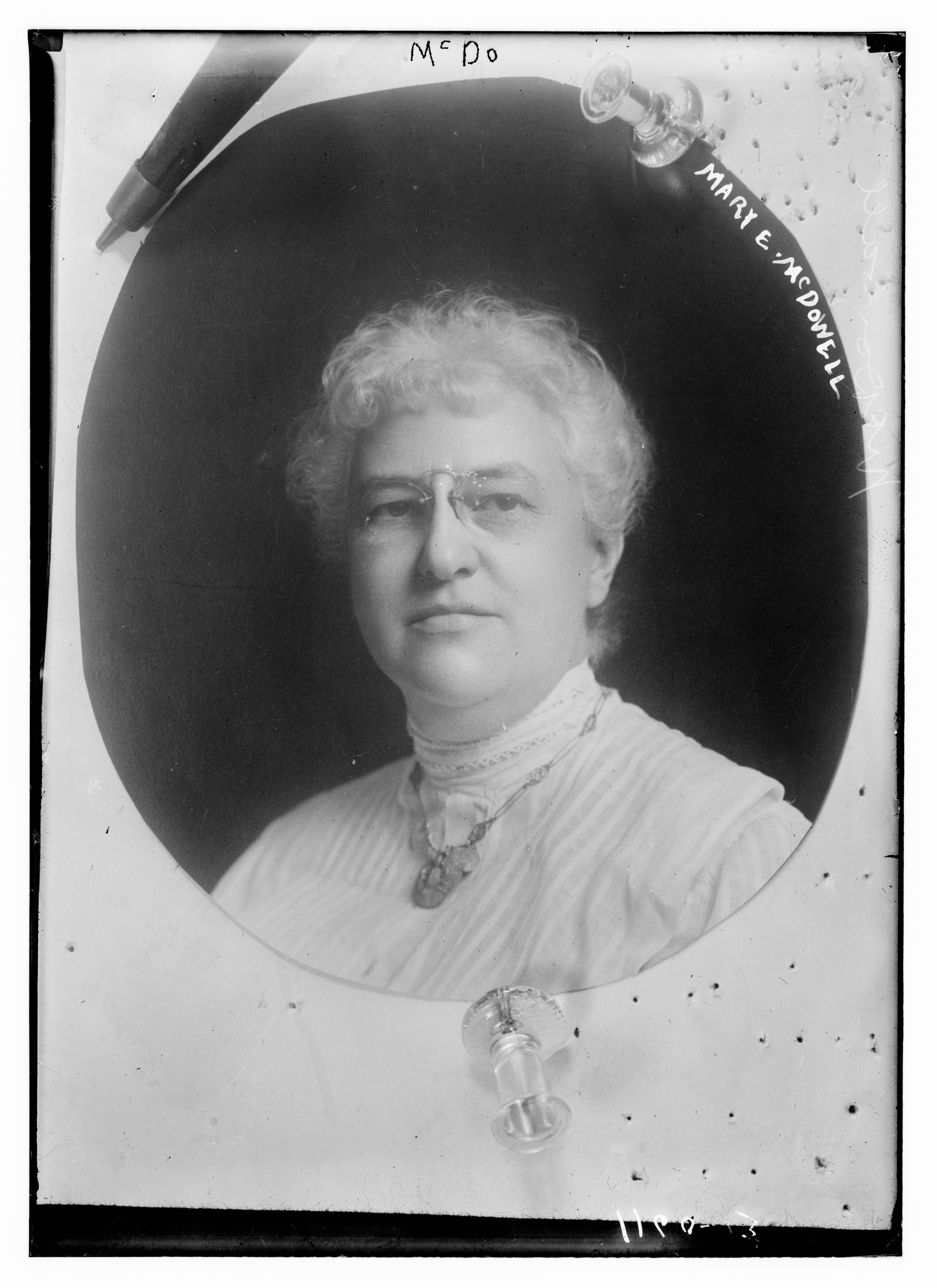
- Born: November 30, 1854; Cincinnati, Ohio
- Died: October 14, 1936 (aged 81); Chicago, Illinois
- Occupation: social reformer

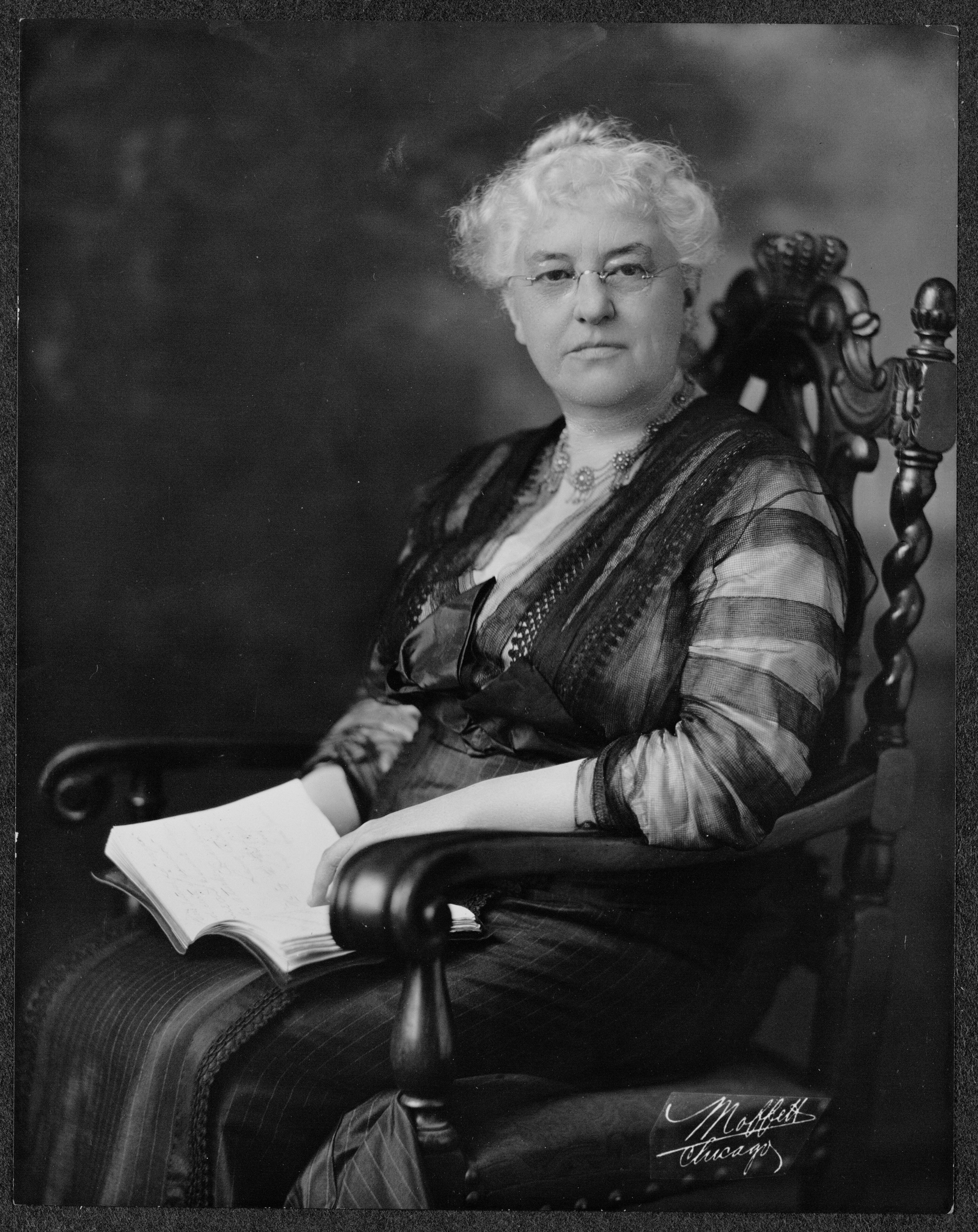
Mary E. McDowell, University of Chicago Settlement, Stock-Yards District, 1900–1916

Mary Eliza McDowell (November 30, 1854 – October 14, 1936) was an American social reformer and prominent figure in the Chicago Settlement movement.

== Early life ==
Mary Eliza McDowell was born on November 30, 1854, to Malcolm and Jane Welch Gordon McDowell in Cincinnati, Ohio, as the oldest of six children. Her father was recognized for his distinguished service in the Civil War and support for the presidency helped to establish her political conviction. After the war, the family left for Chicago where her father opened and managed a steel rolling mill and the family joined the Methodist Church. The changes led her mother to become an invalid, no longer able to care for the family, and McDowell became responsible for her five brothers.

In the family's first few years in Chicago, McDowell was involved in various relief efforts and religious involvement. During the Great Chicago Fire in 1871, McDowell and her father worked to help refugees by transporting people and their belongings to the makeshift camp away from the fire. When aid was received from Ohio, McDowell took the lead in the relief effort and was later recognized by President Rutherford B. Hayes for her service. She later organized religious classes for young people that attracted prominent figures in the temperance movement, students from Northwestern University, and residents of Chicago.

== Career ==
McDowell first began work for Frances Williard, founder of the Women's Christian Temperance Movement, where she met Elizabeth Harrison. With Harrison's support, McDowell started teaching kindergarten classes at the Hull House and helped to organize the women's club under Jane Addams and Ellen Gates Star.

In 1893, The University of Chicago was in its second year of existence and wanted to start an initiative to become involved in the city and looked to the Settlement movement to do so. Working with the university's Christian Union, Jane Addams, and Professor J. Laurence Laughlin, the university established the University of Chicago Settlement House in the Stock Yard District on January 1, 1894, at 4688 South Gross Avenue. Under Addams' recommendation, the university hired McDowell to head a larger Back of the Yards settlement house. The settlement house plan was composed of a colony of houses throughout the ethnically diverse immigrant neighborhood, instead of from the norm of a single house within the community, in order to wield more influence.

In 1894, McDowell opened the University of Chicago Settlement House to alleviate the crowded, unsanitary housing immigrant and African American families often faced. There, she organized classes, provided kindergarten education and accesses to vocational schools, bathing facilities, concerts, lectures. She formed clubs for both men and women, including the Bohemian Women's Club and the Settlement Women's Club. She began to feel that the low wages these families received directly correlated to the low standard of living and welcomed the burgeoning union organizing started in 1901 by labor organizer Michael Donnelley. In 1902, a small group of 20 women became Local 183 of the Amalgamated Meat Cutters and Butcher Workmen of North America. Standing with workers during the stockyard strike of 1904, she counseled on peaceful protests and urged unions to admit African Americans feeling that newer groups were used to break strikes and if different eccentricities were incorporated, the union would become stronger. For her work during the strike, she gained the name "Fighting Mary."

In 1896, the Settlement houses in the U.S. held their first conference to showcase to public officials and institutions the knowledge gained by these communities. McDowell presented a paper on the need to recognize the humanity of charity work and to work directly with individuals in need. In 1906, President Theodore Roosevelt passed along a letter from McDowell to the Agriculture Committee of the House of Representatives, recommending her knowledge of the poor conditions of the Chicago Stock Yards.

McDowell worked with residents to improve their neighborhood as well through education of politic rights and civic consciousness. The garbage dump nearby invited rodents and spread disease and the stagnant water of Bubbly Creek greatly needed cleanup in the neighborhood. She worked with the suffrage movement to put pressure on city officials to clean up the issues. In 1913, Chicago established the Chicago Commission on Waste where McDowell served researching garbage collection methods. Her recommendations were a combination of incineration and reduction plants. Fearing public backlash after the publication of Upton Sinclair's The Jungle, the city allocated funds for garbage disposal facilities. Civic consciousness projects brought her into close proximity with local politicians and in 1923, became the Commissioner of Public Welfare under Mayor William Emmett Dever. In this role, she created a bureau of employment and social surveys.

During World War I, McDowell joined the Council of National Defense, becoming the chairman on the committee on foreign-born women and a member of the executive committee of women in industry. McDowell helped to found the Women's Trade Union League of Chicago and lobbied the U.S. government to establish the Women's Bureau to study living and working conditions of women and children in 1920.

She died on October 14, 1936, in Chicago, suffering from a paralytic stroke.

== See also ==
- Settlement movement
