= Jewish People's Institute =

- U.S. National Register of Historic Places
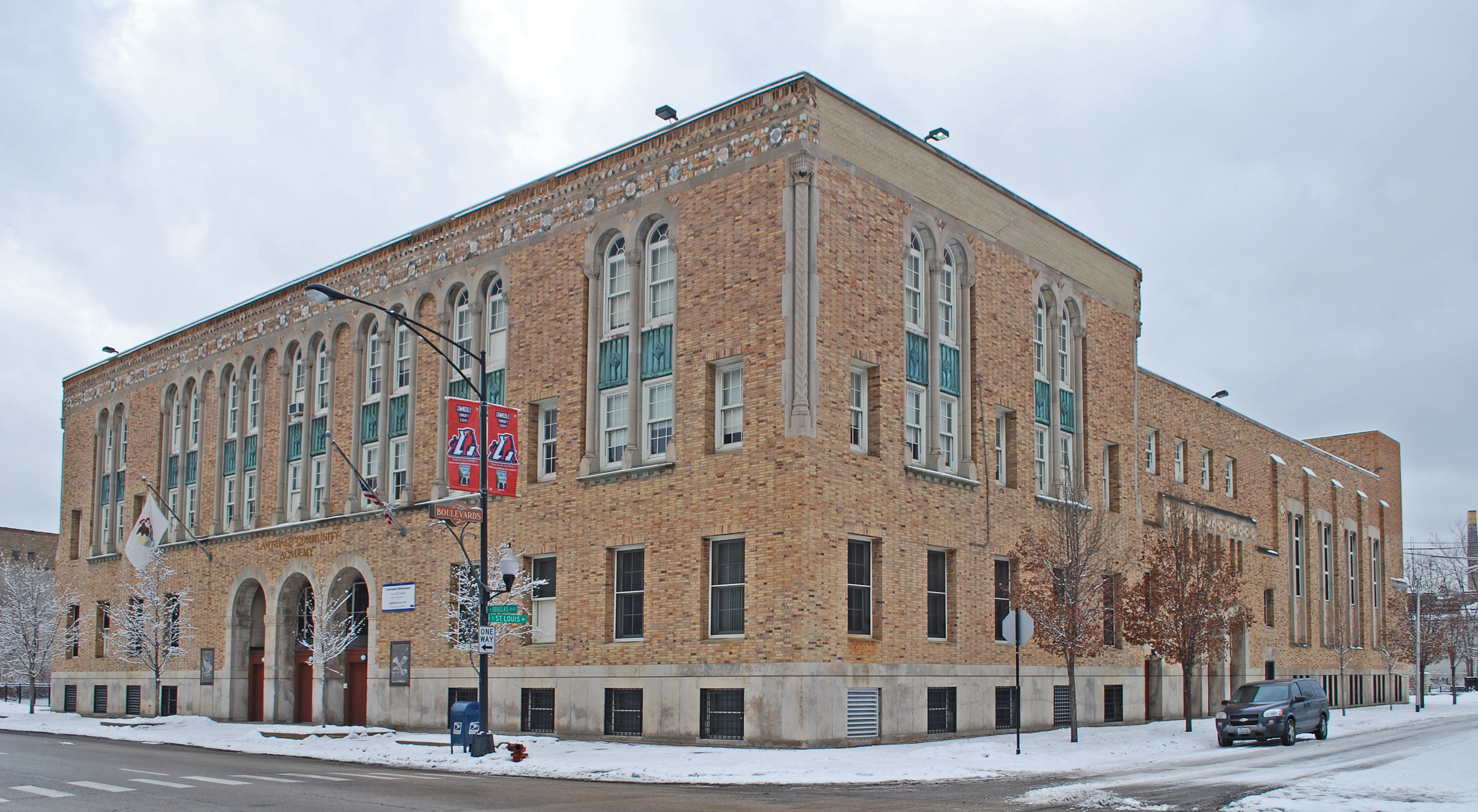

- Location within Chicago metropolitan area Location within Illinois Location within the United States
- Location: 3500 W. Douglas Blvd., Chicago, Illinois
- Coordinates: 41°51′47″N 87°42′47″W
- Built: 1927
- Architect: Grunsfeld & Klaber
- NRHP reference No.: 78001122
- Added to NRHP: November 15, 1978

The Jewish People's Institute is a historic Jewish community center building located at 3500 W. Douglas Boulevard in the North Lawndale community area of Chicago, Illinois. The building was listed on the National Register of Historic Places on November 15, 1978. It is now occupied by the Lawndale Community Academy.

== History ==
The community center had its roots in the Chicago Hebrew Institute, which was founded in 1903 by the city's established Jewish community to support new immigrants. Its building, which was designed by architects Grunsfeld & Klaber, was completed in 1927. The Institute provided both social and educational services to the Jewish community and was often the first point of contact in Chicago for new immigrants. Its educational offerings included evening classes, a Hebrew school, and eventually a junior college, while its social programs included a theatre, recreational areas, and a Naturalization Bureau for those who sought American citizenship.

Notable former attendees include Polia Pillin.
