= Ada S. McKinley =

American educator, settlement house worker, and activist

- Born: June 26, 1868; Galveston, Texas
- Died: August 25, 1952 (aged 84); Chicago, Illinois
- Spouse: William McKinley (m. 1887)

Ada Sophia Dennison McKinley (June 26, 1868 – August 25, 1952) was an American educator, settlement house worker, and activist in Chicago, Illinois. She founded the South Side Settlement House, later renamed in her honor as Ada S. McKinley Community Services. The organization continues to serve thousands in the Chicago metropolitan area, Indiana, and Wisconsin. Because of her pioneering community service work, she is hailed as a "heroine of Chicago's South Side".

== Early life and education ==
Ada Sophia Dennison McKinley was born and raised in Galveston, Texas, during the Reconstruction Era. She subsequently moved with her family to Corpus Christi. After attending Prairie View College and Tillotson Missionary College, Ada became a teacher in Texas schools. In 1887, she married the dentist William McKinley, and moved their family north to Chicago.

== Early activism ==
In Chicago, McKinley became prominent in political and social circles as part of the women's club movement, and was a leading member of the Phyllis Wheatley Club. In 1916, she served as secretary of the Colored Women's Hughes Republican headquarters in Chicago, which backed the unsuccessful presidential campaign of Charles Evans Hughes. She worked with other leading African-American women of Chicago on the campaign, including Ella Berry and Ida B. Wells-Barnett.

In the ensuing years of World War I, McKinley served as head recreational host at the "War Camp Club", organized by the Chicago Urban League, which provided social services to returning soldiers and sailors. The War Camp Club is recognized today as a community-based antecedent to recreational therapy for troops returning from combat. Pivoting from the War Camp Club, McKinley established her own social services program to serve, educate, and employ veterans and other marginalized communities in Chicago's South Side.

After the Chicago race riot of 1919, she marched together with white settlement house workers including Jane Addams and Harriet Vittum to show that interracial solidarity was possible. She also worked with the Chicago Commission on Race Relations to provide aid and alleviate racial tensions

== South Side Settlement ==
McKinley established the Soldiers and Sailors Club in 1919 at a facility on South Wabash. The program attended to the needs of returning African-American servicemen from World War I through providing them meals, shelter, health care, and employment in the community. Ada extended these services to all residents the South Side, but mostly African Americans. Through these services, she would meet the basic needs of thousands of African Americans who settled in the city during The Great Migration.

In 1926, McKinley renamed her organization the South Side Settlement House, becoming its president and chief resident. The settlement house was the first to have an all-black staff and served the largest area in Chicago. The house received funding from the Works Progress Administration in the 1930s and early 1940s. In the 1940s, the growing organization moved to the community center of the Ida B. Wells Homes. The South Side Settlement under McKinley's leadership was distinguished from other settlement houses by its work with Wells Homes residents.

Keen on giving back and promoting higher education, Ada mentored graduate social work students after retirement through her settlement house.

== Death and legacy ==
In 1949, the South Side Settlement was renamed the Ada S. McKinley Community House. McKinley laid the cornerstone at the organization's new headquarters on 34th Street in Bronzeville in 1952. She died just hours later, of a cerebral hemorrhage.

In the 1990s, executive director of Ada S. McKinley Community Services Ralph Burlingham and his wife, Dorothy, discovered that McKinley's gravestone in Glenwood, Illinois, was in severe disrepair. Burlingham stated, "this was not consistent with her dignity and station in life." Ada S. McKinley Community Services arranged to have her reinterred at the Oak Woods Cemetery in Chicago, along with her husband and son. Her monument stands next to a monument to Chicago mayor Harold Washington. The dedication of McKinley's monument was marked by an overflight by the Tuskegee Airmen.

In over 100 years of operation, Ada S. McKinley Community Services, Inc. maintains more than 70 program locations throughout the Chicago metropolitan area and sites in Wisconsin and Indiana, with annual revenue of more than $39 million per year. Annually, these locations collectively serve over 7,000 people, providing mental health counseling, employment resources, youth service, and pathways to higher education. Since the 1960s, the organization has "placed 75k+ people in 400+ colleges and universities." The agency is currently run by CEO Jamal Malone.

McKinley is also the namesake of the Ada S. McKinley Senior Apartments operated by the Chicago Housing Authority in Chicago's Woodlawn neighborhood.

== Works cited ==
- Anne Meis Knupfer (2006). The Chicago Black Renaissance and Women's Activism. University of Illinois Press. ISBN 0252072936.
