= University of Chicago Settlement =

Coordinates: 41.8100°N 87.6636°W

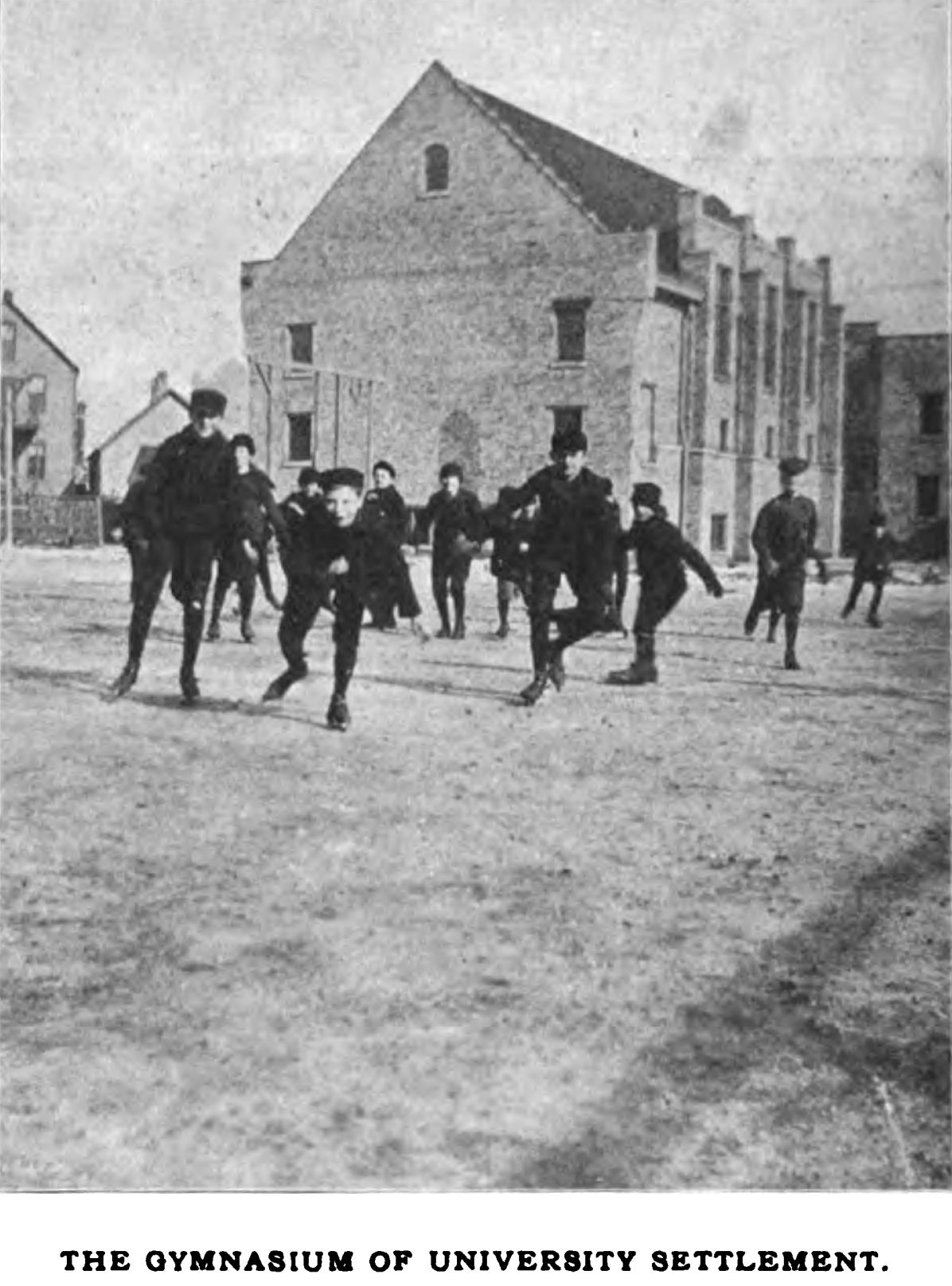
University of Chicago Settlement gymnasium (1900)

University of Chicago Settlement was a settlement of the University of Chicago. It was established January, 1894, by the Philanthropic Committee of the Christian Union of the University of Chicago. Initially, two graduate students (William Johnson and Max West) were in residence "to provide a center for educational, religious and philanthropic work." Mary McDowell became head resident September 15, 1894.

Located at 4630 Gross Avenue (1905-), its former locations included 4655 Gross Avenue, 1894–1869; and 4638 Ashland Avenue, 1896–1905. The locale was the "back of the yards” —- the Union Stock Yards. There, McDowell and 26 other residents conducted civic work, in which they were assisted by students, alumni, and members of the school faculties. These and all members of the university supported the settlement children's yell:— "One, two, three! Who are we? We are the members of the Universitee!"

== History ==
The University of Chicago Settlement incorporated in 1898. It was maintained by subscriptions collected by the University Settlement Board, assisted by the Women's University Settlement League, by collections from the Sunday service of the University of Chicago, by private contributions, and by settlement clubs.

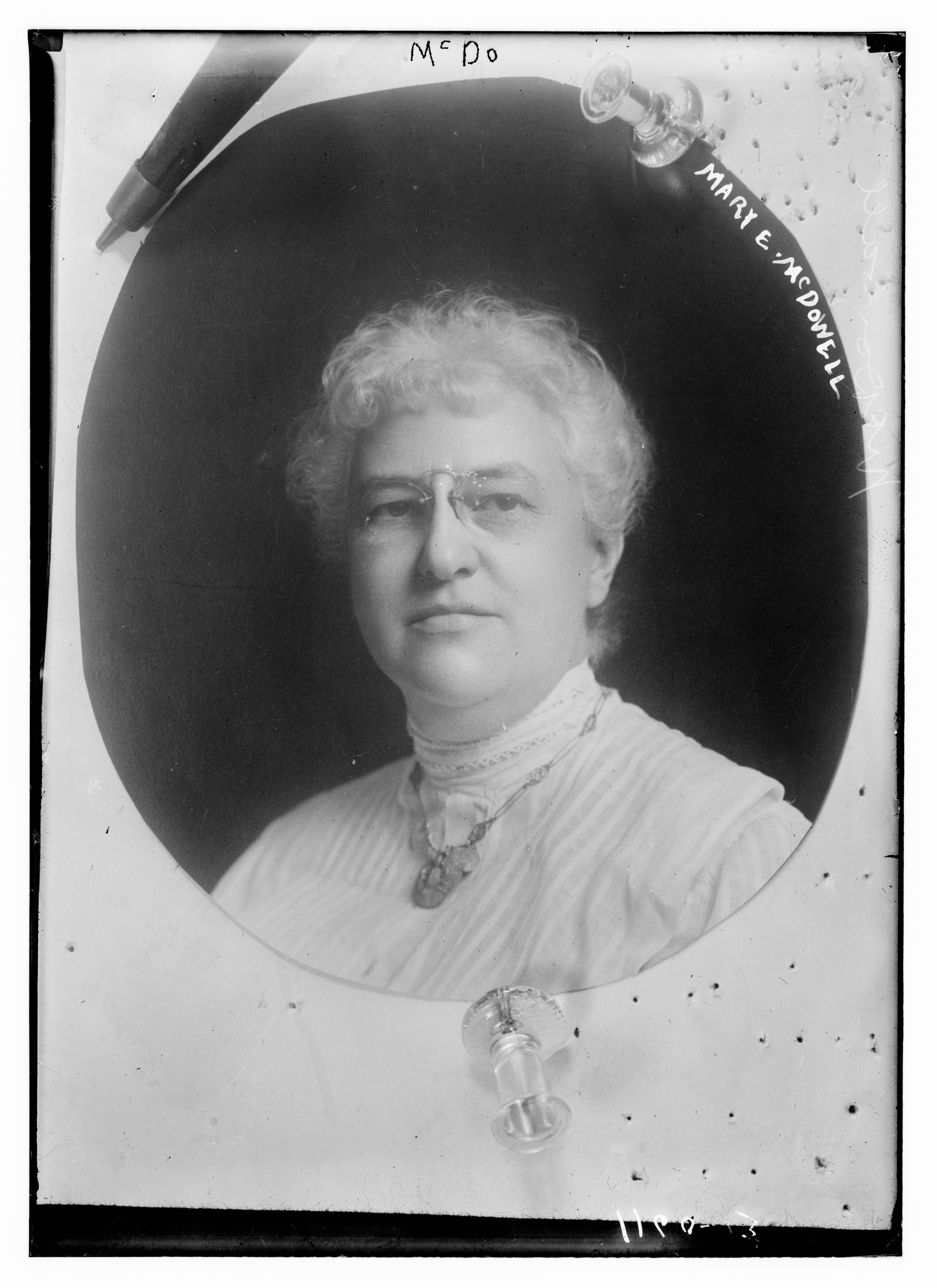
Mary McDowell

A meeting was held by the Christian Union on one of the Sunday evenings in December, 1893, for the purpose of raising funds, at which addresses were made by Professor James Laurence Laughlin and Jane Addams. Five rooms were rented January 1, 1894, and the work began. There were five residents from the university the first year, and ten other workers, students and professors. McDowell was one of the residents the first year, 1894; became the very efficient Head Resident, and was still guiding the work of the Settlement at the close of the university's first quarter-century. McDowell's name appeared regularly in the list of the Staff of Administration and Instruction and in 1903, she was made a special instructor in sociology.

Soon after the beginning of the work, a Settlement Board was organized, property was secured, and a building finally erected. In 1916, this property, at 4630 Gross Avenue, was valued at about US$50,000. The activities of the Settlement for the welfare and happiness of the community were many. From the first, the university interest in the work not only continued, but increased. The collections of the Sunday religious service were devoted to its use. One Sunday in each year was Settlement Sunday, when a special appeal was made for unusual offerings. A University Settlement League of Women was formed to assist in its maintenance. Concerts, dramatic performances, dances were given every year to secure funds for it. Students and professors were helpers of McDowell on the field. Outside friends contributed money and personal service, and the University of Chicago Settlement prospered and performed a constantly growing service for a great community.

The settlement stood in the community as a "Neighborhood House", a social meeting-place, where the families became known to each other, and were associated together for the good of the whole neighborhood. A nearly, if not quite unique feature of this settlement was the neighborhood Council of ten, made up of neighborhood men and women, who conferred with the managers of the settlement concerning its work and the formulation of its policy.

== Neighborhood ==
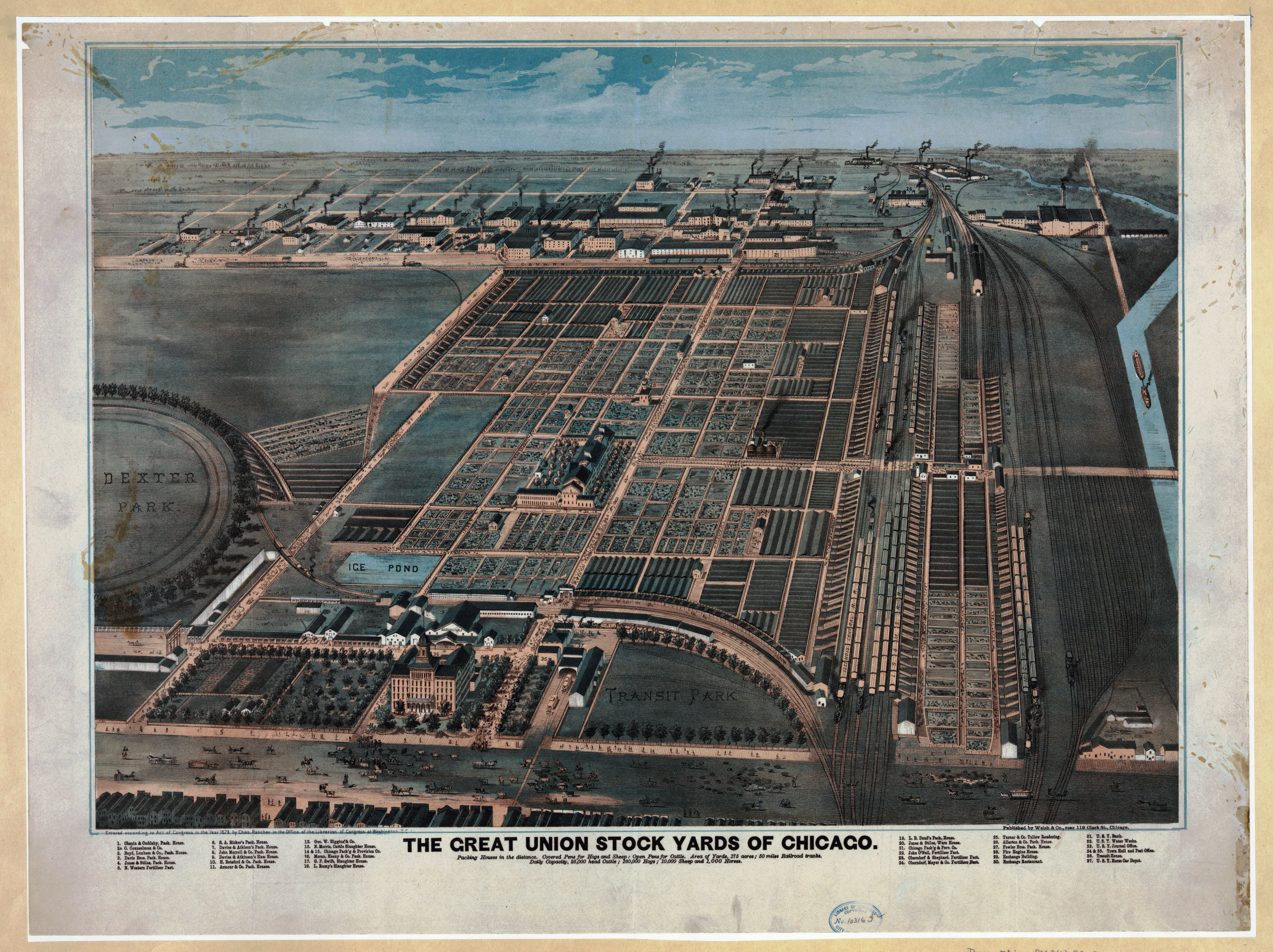
Union Stock yards (1870s)

The neighborhood was in the southwest corner of that square mile, which included the Union Stock Yards and the packing houses, where each day 100,000 animals were slaughtered for the world's market. The physical appearance was that of a frontier prairie town, the dwelling houses being mostly of wood. A little cottage was perhaps purchased on monthly payments and often rented to from three to six families with boarders. Later, it is moved to the rear of the lot and a two-story frame tenement with an attic is built on the front of the lot. The landlord, the owner of the original cottage, may continue to live in it.

When the settlement was established, only a few of the streets were paved, there was no sewer connection with the houses, streets were lighted by lamps, the ditches were covered with a green scum from standing water, transportation was by horse cars, and the sidewalks were of wood.

Between 1909 and 1911, concrete sidewalks were made, some of the streets were paved, most of the houses had sewer connection, the cars were run by electricity, and a few streets had electric lights. Two large banks were built on the corner of 47th Street and Ashland Avenue, and several large department stores were opened. New industries were coming into the community, such as a large foundry and other manufactories. There were still many streets unpaved, many ditches with green scum, while the city garbage dump continued to exist there. The old Irish, Scotch and English neighbors were supplanted by the Bohemian, Pole, Slovac, Lithuanian, Gallician, Croatian, and Slovenian.

This was an industrial community, not a slum, and the standard of life was influenced by the work and wages in the yards. There was a saloon for about every 23 voters. The saloon was the most hospitable place in the community to the non-English speaking people. One Slovac saloon had all the Slovac papers. The intelligent saloon keeper was the friend and counsellor of his people. They met in the back of his saloon as they would in a club house. The only place near the Stock Yards which offered a comfortable seat at a table during the lunch hour was the saloon, which was crowded at the noon half-hour. It was also the political as well as the social center, and the saloon keeper, with the ward politician, was often the only interpreter of American institutions.

== Activities ==
Activities included many informal studies of particular phases of neighborhood life, mostly for some immediate use. There were efforts to better district conditions. These included housing, streets and refuse, play spaces, public schools, labor, economic conditions, moral, and health. Local institutional improvements included starting the first public library service in the quarter, and later, the settlement housed a branch of the public library, which had become a part of the Park Center equipment. The settlement also secured a public park and a public bath, largely through the efforts of its Woman's Club. Residents are represented on many national, state and local bodies. They gave their services constantly in general social educational work, and in presenting phases of the industrial and social needs of its neighborhood.

The settlement maintained a library; kindergarten; resident nurse; probation officer; social work in the Hamline School; school of citizenship; and neighborhood parties (Poles, Slovaks, Bohemians, Finns). There were lectures and opportunity for meeting of independent organizations. Other activities included classes in gymnastics, manual training, natural science, metal work, cooking, sewing, music (piano, chorus, orchestra), dancing. There were many clubs of women, young men and women, and children, with athletic, literary, social and other interests. The Park Centers freed the settlement for special social and educational work with foreigners, and for clubs with special interests not yet supplied by public enterprise.

In the summer, there was a medical and nursing service; summer tent for sick babies; playground for kindergarten children; excursions and picnics; and vacations in co-operation with Fresh Air agencies.

== Young Citizen's Creed ==
"We believe that God hath made of one blood all nations of men, and that we are His children, brothers and sisters all. We are citizens of the United States, and believe our Flag stands for self-sacrifice for the good of all the people. We want to be true citizens of this our city, and therefore will show our love for her by our works. Chicago does not ask us to die for her welfare; she asks us to live for her good, so to live and so to act that her government may be pure, her officers honest, and every home within her boundaries be a place fit to grow the best kind of men and women to rule over her.”—Young Citizen's Creed, by Mary E. McDowell.

== Residents ==
In 1911, there were 21 women residents and 5 men. McDowell was Head Resident since 1894.

== See also ==
- List of settlement houses in Chicago
- Settlement and community houses in the United States
