= Polia Pillin =

Polish-born American ceramist (1909–1992)

- Born: Polia Sukonic; September 1, 1909; Częstochowa, Poland.
- Died: July 25, 1992 (aged 82)
- Other names: Polya Pilin, Polia Sunockin
- Education: School of the Art Institute of Chicago, Jewish People's Institute
- Occupations: Ceramist, potter, painter
- Movement: Modernism
- Spouse: William Pillin (m. 1927–1985; his death)

Polia Pillin, née Sukonic, or Sunockin (September 1, 1909 – July 25, 1992), was a Polish-born American ceramist. She is known for her modernist ceramics and pottery with painted images.

== Early life and education ==
Polia Pillin was born as Polia Sukonic in 1909, in Częstochowa, Poland. She was Jewish. She immigrated to the United States in 1924, and settled in Chicago, Illinois.

Pillin attended the School of the Art Institute of Chicago, and the Jewish People's Institute in Chicago.

In 1927, she met and married Jewish Ukrainian immigrant William Pillin, who also worked as a potter, artist, and poet. They lived near Albuquerque, New Mexico, from 1936 to 1940; Chicago from 1940 to 1948; and finally Los Angeles, California, from 1946 until their deaths.

== Career ==
In her early career, she worked as a painter. Her first solo exhibition was in 1947, at the Art Institute of Chicago.

Pillin used engobe and glaze techniques to create mid-century motifs painted onto hand-thrown pottery such as pots, vases, plates, bowls, etc., with the majority of subjects involving women, horses, cats, fishes, and other animals. She produced most of her work from her home studio, called the Pillin Art Pottery Company, which was set up in the family's garage in Los Angeles. Decorated pieces of Pillin pottery generally sell for $350–$4,000 in 2017.

== List of exhibitions ==
- San Francisco Art Association, 1939
- Art Institute of Chicago, 1947, 1948
- San Francisco Museum of Art, 1948
- Los Angeles County Museum of Art, 1948, 1950
- Oakland Museum, 1950
- California State Fair, 1951 (prize)
- Exhibition of ceramic ware, Willow Gallery in Greenwich Village, New York City, October 1955
- Exhibition of ceramic painting, Circle in the Square Theater in Greenwich Village, New York City, October 1955
- Who's Who in American Art, 1940–1963
- Exhibition at Long Beach Museum of Art, Long Beach, California, November 15–December 6, 1960
- Art show of ceramics and ceramic paintings, Willow Gallery in Greenwich Village, New York City, September 28–October 28, 1961
