= Anna E. Nicholes =

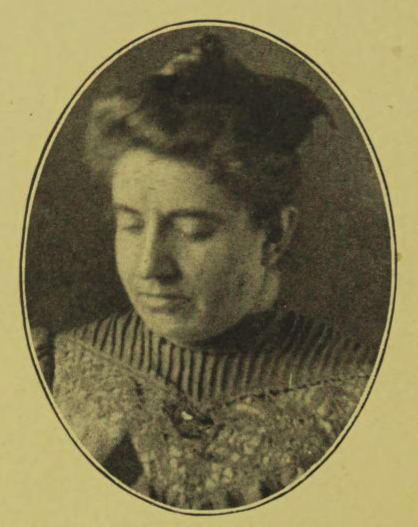
- Born: Anna Eliza Nicholes; May 2, 1865; Chicago, Illinois, U.S.
- Died: July 20, 1917 (aged 52); Traverse City, Michigan, U.S.
- Burial place: Oak Woods Cemetery
- Occupations: social reformer; civil servant; newspaper editor
- Known for: Neighborhood House Chicago
- Relatives: S. Grace Nicholes (sister)

Anna Eliza Nicholes (May 2, 1865 – July 20, 1917) was an American social reformer, civil servant, and clubwoman associated with women's suffrage and the settlement movement in Chicago. She devoted her life to charitable and philanthropic work.

== Early life and education ==
Nicholes was born in Chicago, Illinois, May 2, 1865.

She graduated from Englewood High School (renamed Englewood Technical Prep Academy before closure) and afterward from Rockford College (now Rockford University), in Rockford, Illinois, 1886.

== Career ==
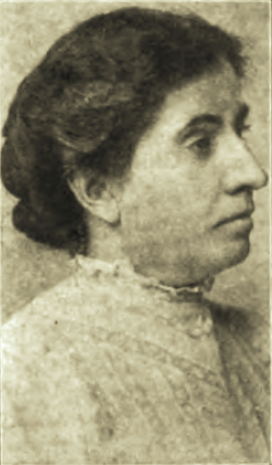
Anna E. Nicholes (1910 publication)

She was a co-founder and the first civic director of the Chicago Woman's Club, as well as a member of its reform department. She was a member of the Englewood Woman's Club, and served as chair of the industrial committee of the Illinois Federation of Women's Clubs. She was a Director of Associated Charities, Englewood District.

Nicholes was a member of the Equal Suffrage Association and of the South Side Suffrage Association.

In 1913, Nicholes became a chosen a member of the Cook County civil service commission, serving as secretary until 1915. Nicholes put life, common sense, and human understanding into a brief career as an officeholder. In one term as county civil service commissioner, she achieved the task of making merit rule. For the time, she revolutionized public employment. In 1915, she resigned for her civil service position in order to continue on with her work at Neighborhood House settlement where Nicholes was a co-founder, and had been head resident for a number of years. She served as director of the Neighborhood House Woman's Club.

She was one of the first persons in the city to encourage the organization of working women. She served as reasurer of the Consumers' League, and as secretary of the Woman's Trade Union League of Illinois. For some time, Nicholes served as editor of the woman's department of the Union Labor Advocate, a feminist labor monthly periodical published in Chicago from 1901.

She served the Rockford College Alumnae Association as president and for six years, was a member of the Board of the Chicago Rockford College Association.

== Personal life ==
Nicholes's grave at Oak Woods Cemetery

Nicholes traveled from the east coast to the west coast of the U.S. In religion, she attended Chicago's Normal Park Presbyterian Church.

Anna E. Nicholes always lived in Chicago. She died July 20, 1917, at her country home near Traverse City, Michigan, and was buried at Oak Woods Cemetery in Chicago. She was survived by her sister, S. Grace Nicholes, of Chicago.

== Selected works ==
While a resident at Neighborhood House Chicago, Nicholes published:

- Nicholes, Anna E., "From School to Work. A Study of the Central Office for issuing Child Labor certificates". Reprint from Commons issued by the Illinois Branch of the Consumers' League.
- Nicholes, Anna E., "Votes and Wages for Women". Issued by Illinois Equal Suffrage Association.
