= S. Grace Nicholes =

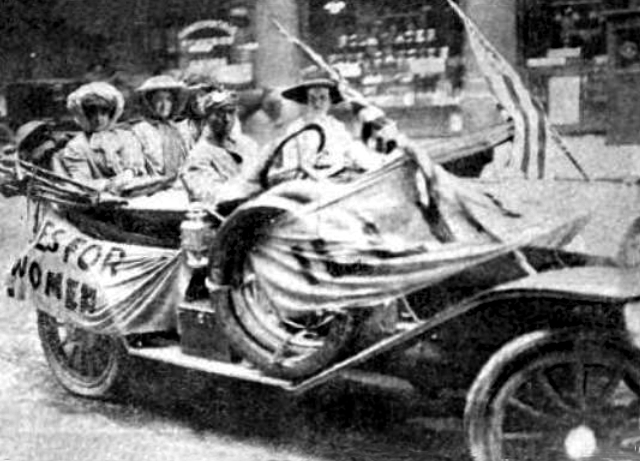
Grace Wilbur Trout, Ella S. Stewart, & Grace Nicholes (l-r)

S. Grace Nicholes (February 15, 1870 – August 22, 1922) was an American social reformer. Like her sister, Anna E. Nicholes, she was a suffragist, a clubwoman, and a co-founder of Neighborhood House Chicago.

== Biography ==
S. Grace Nicholes was born in Chicago, Illinois, February 15, 1870. She was a graduate of Wellesley College.

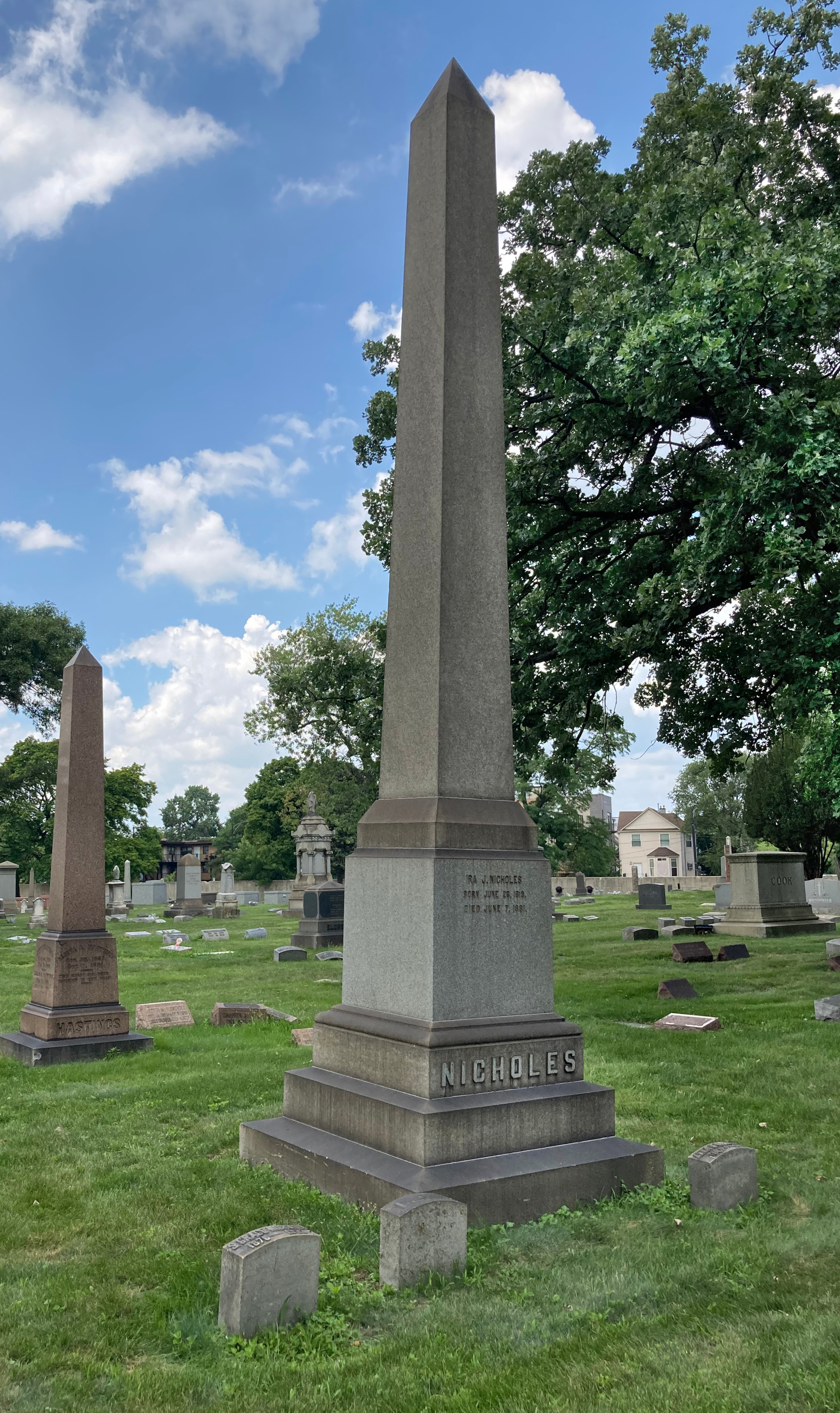
Nicholes' grave at Oak Woods Cemetery

She was for many years identified with the women's suffrage movement in Chicago, serving as corresponding Secretary of the Illinois Equal Suffrage Association. She was a member of the Englewood Woman's Club, Collegiate Alumnae Association, and the South Side Suffrage Association. Nicholes devoted much of her time to social settlement work. She was also one of the charter members of the Chicago Women's Trade Union League.

Nicholes died in Chicago on August 22, 1922. The funeral was held at Neighborhood House, 6710 South May Street, of which she was one of the founders. Interment was made at Oak Woods Cemetery.
