= Northwestern University Settlement House =

Building in Chicago, United States

Coordinates: 41.9000°N 87.6628°W

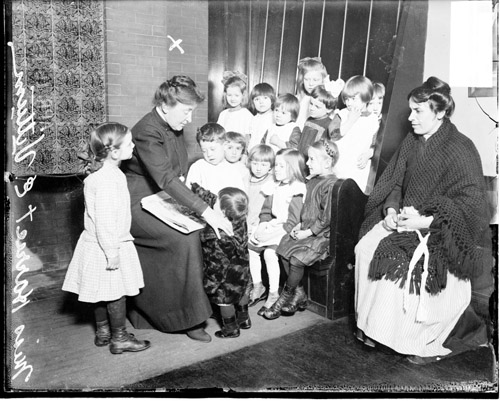
Harriet E. Vittum holding book, Northwestern University settlement house children gathered around, 1914

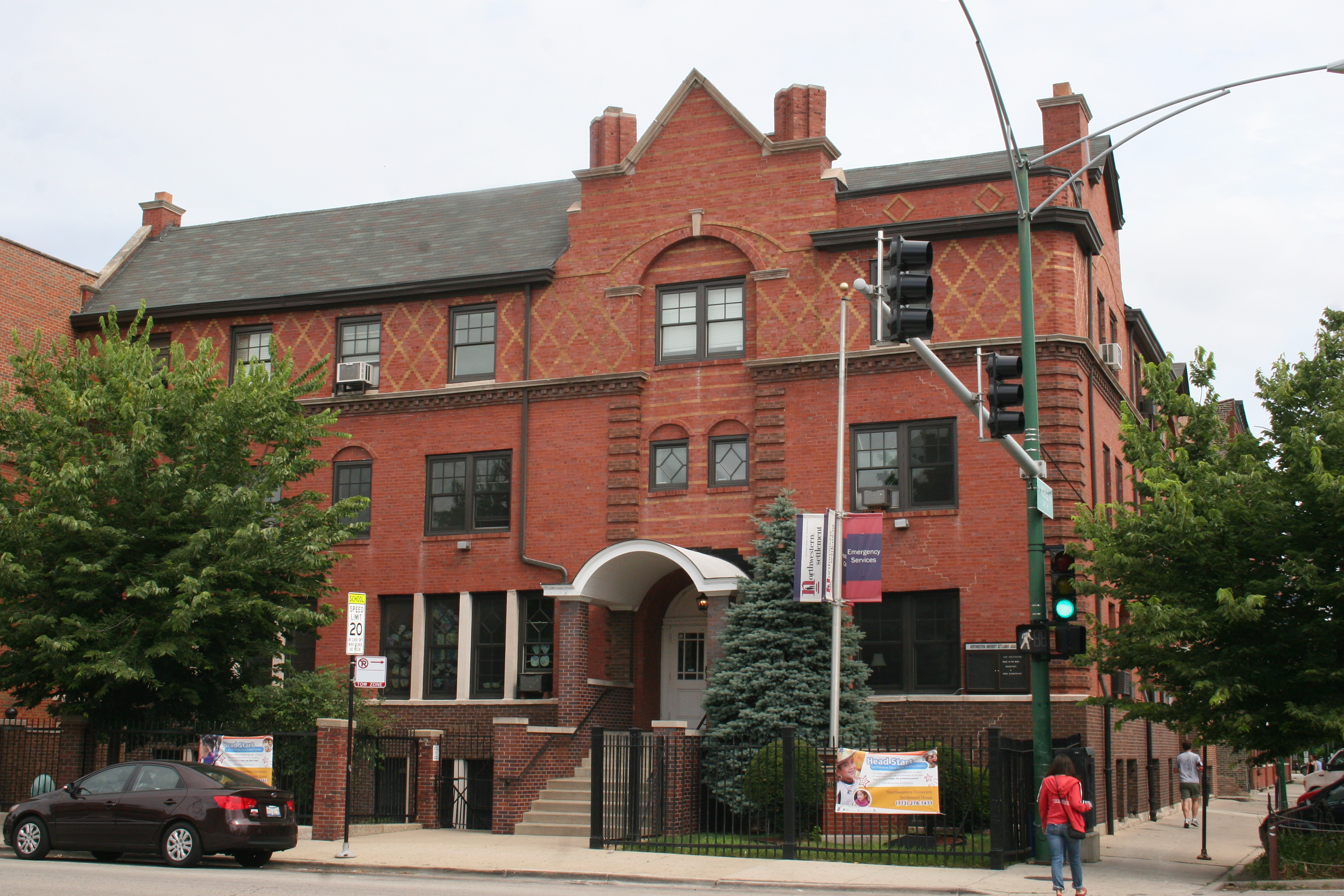
Northwestern University Settlement House

The Northwestern University Settlement House is an Arts and Crafts style house located at 1400 West Augusta Boulevard in Chicago, Illinois, United States. The Settlement Association was founded in 1891 by Northwestern University to provide resources to the poor and new immigrants to the West Town neighborhood. The actual Settlement House structure was built in 1901 by Pond & Pond. It was designated a Chicago Landmark on December 1, 1993.

It is the second longest continually operating settlement house in the country, as well as the largest settlement house in Chicago since the closing of Hull House which was founded by Jane Addams.

== History ==
The Northwestern University Settlement House was one of the major contributions in Chicago history to creating American social reform, as part of a broader, international movement. Advocates of the Settlement movement such as Samuel Barnett and Arnold Toynbee in the UK, and Lillian Wald, Harriet Vittum, and Nobel Peace Prize recipient Jane Addams in the U.S., influenced the social policy arena. Among the many achievements in changing public institutions, they promoted fair salaries for workers and improvement of poor neighborhoods, turned feminism into a social force, advocated the concept of juvenile court, brought about recognition of the child as a person with rights, and developed vast programs to integrate immigrants and promote multiculturalism.

In January 1891, the President of Northwestern University, Henry Wade Rogers, his wife Emma, and two faculty members founded the Settlement Association. They modeled the house on the University Settlement model, developed by Toynbee Hall in London, even featuring designs from portions of the Jane Addams' Hull House. The Northwestern University Settlement House formally opened its new building at 1400 W. Augusta Boulevard, in 1901. Northwestern University Settlement House provided the poor of Chicago's West Town neighborhood with educational and recreational programs. Its mission was to provide resources that empower its "neighbors" to take personal responsibility for overcoming the obstacles of poverty and improving the quality of their lives. It was one of the first to aid Polish immigrants in the late 19th century to the early 20th century.

Today, Northwestern University Settlement House continues to run a traditional settlement operation, providing holistic educational, experiential, arts and emergency services to the entire family, currently serving more than 40,000 individuals annually.
