= National Register of Historic Places listings in North Side Chicago =

There are 100 sites in the National Register of Historic Places listings in North Side Chicago — of more than 350 listings within the City of Chicago, in Cook County, Illinois.

The North Side is defined for this article as the area west of Lake Michigan, north of North Avenue (1600 N.), and east of the Chicago River — plus the area north of Fullerton Avenue going west of the River and north to the Chicago city limits.

== Listings ==
The listed properties are distributed across 20 of the 77 well-defined community areas of Chicago.

	NRHP-listed
^{∞}	NRHP-listed Historic district
*	National Historic Landmark and NRHP-listed
^{∞}	National Historic Landmark and NRHP-listed Historic district

This National Park Service list is complete through NPS recent listings posted September 11, 2026.

	Name on the Register	Image	Date listed	Location	Neighborhood	Description
1	42nd Precinct Police Station	42nd Precinct Police Station	January 29, 2013 (#12001236)	3600 N. Halsted Street; 41°56′51″N 87°38′58″W	Lake View	Former Chicago Police Station and Lake View Town Hall
2	Alta Vista Terrace Historic District	Alta Vista Terrace Historic District	March 16, 1972 (#72000448)	Block bounded by Byron Street, Grace Street, N. Kenmore Avenue, and N. Seminary Avenue; 41°56′59″N 87°39′26″W	Lake View	Built in 1904
3	Anderson-Carlson Building	Anderson-Carlson Building	November 15, 2005 (#05001259)	2046 W. Farwell Avenue; 42°00′31″N 87°40′58″W	West Ridge	
4	Andersonville Commercial Historic District	Andersonville Commercial Historic District	March 9, 2010 (#08000294)	4900-5800 Blocks of N. Clark Street; 41°59′00″N 87°40′08″W	Edgewater	
5	The Aquitania	The Aquitania	March 1, 2002 (#02000099)	5000 N. Marine Drive; 41°58′25″N 87°39′05″W	Uptown	
6	Emil Bach House	Emil Bach House	January 23, 1979 (#79000821)	7415 Sheridan Road; 42°00′58″N 87°39′53″W	Rogers Park	House designed by Frank Lloyd Wright
7	Uptown Theatre	Uptown Theatre	November 20, 1986 (#86003181)	4814-4816 Broadway; 41°58′11″N 87°39′38″W	Uptown	
8	Belden Stratford Hotel	Belden Stratford Hotel	May 11, 1992 (#92000485)	2300 N. Lincoln Park West; 41°55′26″N 87°38′12″W	Lincoln Park	
9	Belmont-Sheffield Trust and Savings Bank Building	Belmont-Sheffield Trust and Savings Bank Building	March 1, 1984 (#84000931)	1001 W. Belmont Avenue and 3146 N. Sheffield Avenue; 41°56′23″N 87°39′17″W	Lake View	
10	Berger Park	Berger Park	January 12, 2010 (#09001225)	6205-6247 N. Sheridan Road; 41°59′41″N 87°39′20″W	Edgewater	
11	Best Brewing Company of Chicago Building	Best Brewing Company of Chicago Building	July 30, 1987 (#87001263)	1315-1317 W. Fletcher Street; 41°56′19″N 87°39′42″W	Lake View	
12	Biograph Theater Building	Biograph Theater Building	May 17, 1984 (#84000934)	2433 N. Lincoln Avenue; 41°55′35″N 87°38′57″W	Lincoln Park	
13	Bohemian National Cemetery	Bohemian National Cemetery	May 11, 2006 (#06000374)	5255 N. Pulaski Road; 41°58′45″N 87°43′27″W	North Park	
14	The Charles and Emma Brodt House		August 29, 2025 (#100012165)	1436 W. Foster Avenue; 41°58′35″N 87°39′59″W	Edgewater	
15	Roger Brown Home and Studio	Roger Brown Home and Studio	February 22, 2011 (#11000029)	1926 N. Halsted Street; 41°55′01″N 87°38′56″W	Lincoln Park	
16	Bryn Mawr Avenue Historic District	Bryn Mawr Avenue Historic District	April 20, 1995 (#95000482)	W. Bryn Mawr Avenue from N. Sheridan Road to N. Broadway; 41°59′02″N 87°39′22″W	Edgewater	
17	Buena Park Historic District	Buena Park Historic District	July 13, 1984 (#84000937)	Roughly bounded by Graceland Cemetery, N. Marine Drive, W. Irving Park Road, & W. Montrose Avenue; 41°57′29″N 87°39′06″W	Uptown	
18	Building at 2440 N. Lakeview Avenue	Building at 2440 N. Lakeview Avenue	November 22, 2011 (#11000847)	2440 N. Lakeview Avenue; 41°55′36″N 87°38′23″W	Lincoln Park	
19	Building at 320 West Oakdale Avenue	Building at 320 West Oakdale Avenue	April 23, 2013 (#13000184)	320 W. Oakdale Avenue; 41°56′09″N 87°38′17″W	Lake View	
20	Building at 399 West Fullerton Parkway	Building at 399 West Fullerton Parkway	May 22, 2007 (#07000456)	399 W. Fullerton Parkway; 41°55′31″N 87°38′21″W	Lincoln Park	
21	Building at 5510 North Sheridan	Building at 5510 North Sheridan	August 8, 2001 (#01000870)	5510 N. Sheridan Road; 41°58′57″N 87°39′20″W	Edgewater	
22	Castlewood Terrace	Castlewood Terrace	September 3, 2009 (#09000232)	819-959 W. Castlewood Terrace; 41°58′14″N 87°39′06″W	Uptown	
23	Chicago and North Western Railroad Depot	Chicago and North Western Railroad Depot	February 9, 2001 (#01000081)	6088 N. Northwest Highway; 41°59′30″N 87°47′56″W	Norwood Park	
24	Chicago Park Boulevard System Historic District	Chicago Park Boulevard System Historic District	December 18, 2018 (#12000040)	Douglass Park, Gage, McKinley Park, Jackson Park, Sherman Park, Washington Park, Garfield Park & Humboldt Parks, E. Oakwood, S. Drexel Boulevards		
25	Chicago Municipal Tuberculosis Sanitarium District	Chicago Municipal Tuberculosis Sanitarium District	September 26, 2019 (#100003913)	5601-6000 N. Pulaski Road; 41°59′09″N 87°43′42″W	North Park	
26	Congress Theater	Congress Theater	January 6, 2017 (#16000579)	2117-2139 N. Milwaukee Avenue; 41°55′12″N 87°41′33″W	Logan Square	
27	Covent Hotel	Covent Hotel	September 5, 2017 (#100001561)	2653-65 N. Clark Street; 41°55′52″N 87°38′38″W	Lincoln Park	
28	The Cornelia		August 11, 2022 (#100007997)	3500 N. Lake Shore Drive; 41°56′49″N 87°38′34″W	Lake View	
29	Davis Theater	Davis Theater	April 26, 2016 (#15000930)	4616-4630 N. Lincoln Avenue; 41°57′56″N 87°41′12″W	Lincoln Square	
30	Francis J. Dewes House	Francis J. Dewes House	August 14, 1973 (#73000694)	503 W. Wrightwood Avenue; 41°55′50″N 87°38′31″W	Lincoln Park	
31	East Ravenswood Historic District	East Ravenswood Historic District	September 3, 1991 (#91001364)	Roughly bounded by W. Lawrence Avenue, N. Clark Street, W. Irving Park Road and N. Ravenswood Avenue; 41°57′37″N 87°40′09″W	Lake View and Uptown	
32	Edgewater Beach Apartments	Edgewater Beach Apartments	August 16, 1994 (#94000979)	5555 N. Sheridan Road; 41°59′01″N 87°39′17″W	Edgewater	
33	Edgewater Glen Historic District	Edgewater Glen Historic District	December 30, 2024 (#100011201)	Roughly bounded by W. Hood Avenue on the north, W. Norwood Street on the south, Broadway the east, and Clark Street on the west. 41°59′34″N 87°39′55″W	Edgewater	
34	Edison Park	Edison Park	September 21, 2007 (#07000990)	6755 N. Northwest Highway; 42°00′14″N 87°49′03″W	Edison Park	
35	Episcopal Church of the Atonement and Parish House	Episcopal Church of the Atonement and Parish House	July 30, 2009 (#09000590)	5751 N. Kenmore Avenue; 41°59′12″N 87°39′24″W	Edgewater	
36	Epworth Methodist Episcopal Church	Epworth Methodist Episcopal Church	June 10, 2008 (#08000503)	5253 N. Kenmore Avenue; 41°58′39″N 87°39′23″W	Edgewater	
37	Eugene Field Park	Eugene Field Park	August 8, 2006 (#06000677)	5100 N. Ridgeway Avenue; 41°58′36″N 87°43′25″W	Albany Park and North Park	
38	Falconer Bungalow Historic District	Falconer Bungalow Historic District	March 7, 2007 (#07000114)	Roughly bounded by W. Wellington Avenue, N. Lamon Avenue, N. Laramie Avenue, and the alley north of W. Diversey Avenue; 41°56′00″N 87°45′10″W	Belmont Cragin	
39	John Gauler Houses	John Gauler Houses	June 17, 1977 (#77000475)	5917-5921 N. Magnolia Avenue; 41°59′23″N 87°39′40″W	Edgewater	
40	Henry Gerber House	Henry Gerber House	July 21, 2015 (#15000584)	1710 N. Crilly Court; 41°54′47″N 87°38′09″W	Lincoln Park	1885 Queen Anne Style house where Henry Gerber founded the short-lived Society for Human Rights in the mid-1920s, the first American LGBT rights organization
41	Getty Tomb	Getty Tomb	February 15, 1974 (#74000750)	Graceland Cemetery, N. Clark Street and W. Irving Park Road; 41°57′40″N 87°39′41″W	Uptown	
42	Graceland Cemetery	Graceland Cemetery	January 18, 2001 (#00001628)	4001 N. Clark Street; 41°57′28″N 87°39′50″W	Uptown	
43	Ann Halsted House	Ann Halsted House	August 17, 1973 (#73000695)	440 W. Belden Avenue; 41°55′26″N 87°38′25″W	Lincoln Park	
44	Hermitage Apartments	Hermitage Apartments	February 14, 1985 (#85000266)	4606 N. Hermitage Avenue; 41°57′57″N 87°40′22″W	Uptown	
45	Hermosa Bungalow Historic District	Hermosa Bungalow Historic District	December 31, 2018 (#100003263)	Roughly bounded by W. Belmont Avenue, N. Lowell Avenue, W. Diversey Avenue & N. Kolmar Avenue. 41°56′07″N 87°44′17″W	Hermosa	
46	Immaculata High School	Immaculata High School	August 30, 1977 (#77000476)	600 W. Irving Park Road; 41°57′18″N 87°38′45″W	Uptown	
47	Independence Park	Independence Park	February 18, 2009 (#09000023)	3945 N. Springfield Avenue; 41°57′09″N 87°43′30″W	Irving Park	
48	Indian Boundary Park	Indian Boundary Park	April 20, 1995 (#95000485)	2500 W. Lunt Avenue; 42°00′34″N 87°41′36″W	West Ridge	
49	Jefferson Park	Jefferson Park	August 8, 2006 (#06000679)	4822 N. Long Avenue; 41°58′14″N 87°45′50″W	Jefferson Park	
50	Kosciuszko Park Field House	Kosciuszko Park Field House	October 16, 2013 (#13000830)	2732 N. Avers Avenue; 41°55′51″N 87°43′26″W	Logan Square	
51	Krause Music Store	Krause Music Store	May 31, 2006 (#06000452)	4611 N. Lincoln Avenue; 41°58′02″N 87°41′10″W	Lincoln Square	
52	Lakeview Historic District	Lakeview Historic District	September 15, 1977 (#77000478)	Roughly bounded by W. Wrightwood Avenue, N. Lakeview Avenue, N. Sheridan Road, W. Belmont Avenue, N. Halsted Street, W. Wellington Avenue, N. Racine Avenue, and W. George Street; also 701, 705, 711, 715-717, 721, 733-735, 737, and 739 W. Belmont Avenue, 3162 and 3164 N. Orchard Street, and 3171 N. Halsted Street; 41°56′06″N 87°38′56″W	Lake View and Lincoln Park	Second set of boundaries represents a boundary increase of May 16, 1986
53	Lakewood Balmoral Historic District	Lakewood Balmoral Historic District	February 12, 1999 (#99000162)	Bounded by N. Magnolia Avenue, N. Wayne Avenue, W. Foster Avenue, and W. Bryn Mawr Avenue; 41°58′48″N 87°39′45″W	Edgewater	
54	Julia C. Lathrop Homes	Julia C. Lathrop Homes	February 21, 2012 (#12000025)	Bounded by N. Clybourn Avenue, N. Damen Avenue, N. Leavitt Street & the North Branch of the Chicago River; 41°55′47″N 87°40′27″W	Lincoln Park and North Center	
55	Lincoln Park	Lincoln Park	August 26, 1994 (#94001029)	2045 N. Lincoln Park West; 41°55′49″N 87°37′52″W	Lincoln Park	
56	Lincoln Park Lily Pool	Lincoln Park Lily Pool	February 17, 2006 (#06000235)	W. Fullerton Drive between N. Cannon Drive and N. Stockton Drive in Lincoln Park; 41°55′30″N 87°38′02″W	Lincoln Park	
57	Lincoln Park, South Pond Refectory	Lincoln Park, South Pond Refectory	November 20, 1986 (#86003154)	2021 N. Stockton Drive; 41°55′09″N 87°38′02″W	Lincoln Park	
58	Logan Square Boulevards Historic District	Logan Square Boulevards Historic District	November 20, 1985 (#85002901)	W. Logan Boulevard, Logan Square, N. Kedzie Boulevard, Palmer Square, and N. Humboldt Boulevard; 41°55′42″N 87°42′25″W	Logan Square	Three boulevards connected by two parks, on both the North Side and West Side.
59	Charles N. Loucks House	Charles N. Loucks House	February 9, 1984 (#84001006)	3926 N. Keeler Avenue; 41°57′09″N 87°43′58″W	Irving Park	
60	Malden Towers	Malden Towers	December 8, 1983 (#83003560)	4521 N. Malden Street; 41°57′51″N 87°39′43″W	Uptown	
61	Mandel Brothers Warehouse Building	Mandel Brothers Warehouse Building	August 19, 1993 (#93000841)	3254 N. Halsted Street; 41°56′30″N 87°38′58″W	Lake View	
62	Manor House	Manor House	August 12, 1987 (#87001290)	1021-1029 W. Bryn Mawr Avenue; 41°59′01″N 87°39′22″W	Edgewater	
63	Meekerville Historic District	Meekerville Historic District	May 12, 2006 (#06000383)	303 W. Barry Avenue, 325,303-341,344 W. Wellington Avenue, 340 W. Oakdale Avenue; 41°56′12″N 87°38′18″W	Lake View	
64	Mundelein College Skyscraper Building	Mundelein College Skyscraper Building	May 31, 1980 (#80001348)	6363 N. Sheridan Road; 41°59′54″N 87°39′25″W	Rogers Park	
65	Noble-Seymour-Crippen House	Noble-Seymour-Crippen House	August 10, 2000 (#00000950)	5622-5624 N. Newark Avenue; 41°59′02″N 87°47′43″W	Norwood Park	
66	North Mayfair Bungalow Historic District	North Mayfair Bungalow Historic District	February 1, 2006 (#05001608)	Roughly bounded by W. Foster Avenue, N. Pulaski Road, N. Kilbourn Avenue, and W. Lawrence Avenue; 41°58′19″N 87°44′08″W	Albany Park	
67	Northwestern Terra Cotta Company Building	Northwestern Terra Cotta Company Building	February 8, 1989 (#88003245)	1701-1711 W. Terra Cotta Place; 41°55′40″N 87°40′17″W	Lincoln Park	
68	Norwood Park Historical District	Norwood Park Historical District	November 21, 2002 (#02001350)	Roughly bounded by N. Harlem Avenue, N. Nagle Avenue, W. Bryn Mawr Avenue, and N. Avondale Avenue; 41°59′21″N 87°47′59″W	Norwood Park	
69	Old Main Building	Old Main Building	February 11, 1982 (#82002529)	3235 W. Foster Avenue on North Park College Campus; 41°58′30″N 87°42′36″W	North Park	
70	Old Town Triangle Historic District	Old Town Triangle Historic District	November 8, 1984 (#84000347)	Roughly bounded by W. Armitage Avenue, W. North Avenue, N. Clark Street, and N. Mohawk Street. 41°54′49″N 87°38′01″W	Lincoln Park	
71	Passionist Fathers Monastery	Passionist Fathers Monastery	March 6, 2013 (#13000048)	5700 N. Harlem Avenue; 41°59′07″N 87°48′30″W	Norwood Park	
72	Pattington Apartments	Pattington Apartments	March 8, 1980 (#80001349)	660-700 W. Irving Park Road; 41°57′17″N 87°38′54″W	Uptown	
73	Portage Park	Portage Park	April 20, 1995 (#95000484)	4100 N. Long Avenue; 41°57′18″N 87°45′52″W	Portage Park	
74	Portage Park Bungalow Historic District	Portage Park Bungalow Historic District	September 17, 2014 (#14000620)	Roughly bounded by W. Pensacola Street, N. Lockwood Avenue & N. Central Avenue and W. Hutchinson Street; 41°57′31″N 87°45′49″W	Portage Park	
75	Ravenswood Manor Historic District	Ravenswood Manor Historic District	September 5, 2008 (#08000836)	Bounded by N. Sacramento Avenue, North Branch of Chicago River, alleys south of W. Lawrence Avenue and north of W. Montrose Avenue; 41°57′55″N 87°42′03″W	Albany Park	
76	Reebie Moving and Storage Company	Reebie Moving and Storage Company	March 21, 1979 (#79000828)	2325-2333 N. Clark Street; 41°55′28″N 87°38′23″W	Lincoln Park	
77	Jacob A. Riis Park	Jacob A. Riis Park	April 20, 1995 (#95000483)	6100 W. Fullerton Avenue; 41°55′33″N 87°46′44″W	Belmont Cragin	
78	Rogers Park Manor Bungalow Historic District	Rogers Park Manor Bungalow Historic District	November 15, 2005 (#05001258)	Roughly bounded by W. Lunt Avenue, N. Western Avenue, both sides of W. Farwell Avenue and N. California Avenue; 42°00′24″N 87°41′42″W	West Ridge	
79	Ropp-Grabill House	Ropp-Grabill House	April 15, 1985 (#85000840)	4132 N. Keeler Avenue; 41°57′24″N 87°43′58″W	Irving Park	
80	Rosehill Cemetery Administration Building and Entry Gate	Rosehill Cemetery Administration Building and Entry Gate	April 24, 1975 (#75000651)	5800 N. Ravenswood Avenue; 41°59′11″N 87°40′31″W	Lincoln Square	
81	Theodore Rozek House	Theodore Rozek House	November 2, 2011 (#11000779)	6337 N. Hermitage Avenue; 41°59′54″N 87°40′23″W	Edgewater	
82	Sauganash Historic District	Sauganash Historic District	June 7, 2010 (#10000310)	Roughly bounded by N. Lemont Avenue, N. Keating Avenue, the Chicago and Northwestern Railway and the alley to the east of N. Kilbourn Avenue; 41°59′24″N 87°44′32″W	Forest Glen	
83	Schorsch Irving Park Gardens Historic District	Schorsch Irving Park Gardens Historic District	February 25, 2004 (#04000075)	Roughly bounded by W. Grace Street, W. Patterson Avenue, N. Austin Avenue, and N. Melvena Avenue; 41°57′00″N 87°46′45″W	Dunning	
84	Carl Schurz High School	Carl Schurz High School	February 22, 2011 (#11000031)	3601 N. Milwaukee Avenue; 41°56′47″N 87°44′08″W	Irving Park	
85	Sheffield Historic District	Sheffield Historic District	January 11, 1976 (#76000704)	Bounded roughly by W. Fullerton Avenue, N. Lincoln Avenue, N. Larrabee Street, W. Dickens Avenue, N. Burling Street, W. Wisconsin Street, N. Clybourn Avenue, N. Lakewood Avenue, W. Belden Avenue, and N. Southport Avenue; also W. Montana Street, W. Altgeld Street and Southport Avenue; also roughly bounded by W. Altgeld Street and N. Lakewood Avenue, W. Fullerton Avenue, N. Southport Avenue; also roughly bounded by W. Wisconsin Street, W. Armitage Avenue, N. Howe Street, N. Halsted Street, N. Willow Street, and N. Kenmore Avenue; 41°55′15″N 87°39′12″W	Lincoln Park	Second, third, and fourth sets of boundaries represent boundary increases of February 17, 1983, June 19, 1985, and August 22, 1986 respectively
86	Sheridan Park Historic District	Sheridan Park Historic District	December 27, 1985 (#85003352)	Roughly bounded by W. Lawrence Avenue, N. Racine Avenue, W. Montrose Avenue, and N. Clark Street; 41°57′55″N 87°39′47″W	Uptown	
87	Sheridan Plaza Hotel	Sheridan Plaza Hotel	November 21, 1980 (#80001350)	4601-4613 N. Sheridan Road; 41°57′56″N 87°39′16″W	Uptown	
88	Swedish American Telephone Company Building	Swedish American Telephone Company Building	September 13, 1985 (#85002286)	5235-5257 N. Ravenswood Avenue; 41°58′39″N 87°40′27″W	Edgewater	
89	Talman West Ridge Bungalow Historic District	Talman West Ridge Bungalow Historic District	December 10, 2008 (#08001169)	Bounded roughly by N. Campbell Avenue, W. Devon Avenue, N. Fairfield Avenue, and W. Pratt Avenue; 41°59′52″N 87°41′32″W	West Ridge	
90	Curt Teich and Company Building	Curt Teich and Company Building	March 7, 1990 (#90000340)	1733-55 W. Irving Park Road; 41°57′14″N 87°40′25″W	Lake View	
91	Theurer-Wrigley House	Theurer-Wrigley House	July 28, 1980 (#80001352)	2466 N. Lakeview Avenue; 41°55′39″N 87°38′21″W	Lincoln Park	
92	Uptown Broadway Building	Uptown Broadway Building	November 6, 1986 (#86003143)	4703-4715 N. Broadway; 41°58′05″N 87°39′31″W	Uptown	
93	Uptown Square Historic District	Uptown Square Historic District	November 8, 2000 (#00001336)	Roughly along Lawrence Avenue, and Broadway; 41°58′05″N 87°39′26″W	Uptown	
94	Vassar Swiss Underwear Company Building	Vassar Swiss Underwear Company Building	September 17, 2008 (#07000859)	2545 W. Diversey Avenue; 41°55′56″N 87°41′35″W	Logan Square	
95	Villa Historic District	Villa Historic District	September 11, 1979 (#79000830)	Roughly bounded by N. Avondale Avenue, W. Addison Street, N. Pulaski Road and N. Hamlin Avenue; also 3948-3952 and 3949-3953 W. Waveland Avenue; 41°56′52″N 87°43′30″W	Avondale and Irving Park	Second set of boundaries represents a boundary increase of March 10, 1983
96	Werner Brothers Storage Warehouse No. 6		September 5, 2024 (#100010783)	7613 N. Paulina Street; 42°01′12″N 87°40′23″W	Rogers Park	
97	West Argyle Street Historic District	West Argyle Street Historic District	June 3, 2010 (#10000311)	Roughly bounded by N. Sheridan Road, W. Ainslie Street, N. Broadway, and W. Winona Street; also N. Broadway & E. block face of N. Sheridan Road between W. Argyle Street & W. Winona Avenue; 41°58′24″N 87°39′28″W	Uptown	Second set of boundaries represents a boundary increase of July 30, 2013:
98	Wrightwood Bungalow Historic District	Wrightwood Bungalow Historic District	September 15, 2004 (#04000975)	4600 and 4700 Blocks of W. Wrightwood Avenue; 41°55′42″N 87°44′39″W	Belmont Cragin	
99	Wrigley Field	Wrigley Field	September 23, 2020 (#100005739)	1060 W. Addison Street; 41°56′53″N 87°39′21″W	Lake View	
100	Yondorf Block and Hall	Yondorf Block and Hall	November 13, 1984 (#84000297)	758 W. North Avenue; 41°54′40″N 87°38′53″W	Lincoln Park	

== See also ==
- List of Chicago Landmarks
- National Register of Historic Places in Chicago
  - National Register of Historic Places listings in Central Chicago
  - National Register of Historic Places listings in South Side Chicago
  - National Register of Historic Places listings in West Side Chicago
- List of Registered Historic Places in Illinois
- List of National Historic Landmarks in Illinois
