= Hield (surname) =

Hield is an English surname. It is derived from the Old English hielde, meaning "slope", indicating that one lived near a bend or a hill. Notable people with the surname include:

- Buddy Hield (born 1992), Bahamian basketball player
- Fay Hield (born 1978), traditional English folk singer
- George C. Hield (1852–1957), American businessman

== See also ==
- Sam Hield Hamer (1869–1941), English writer
