= Houlder Hudgins =

Houlder Hudgins (1900–1963) was an American professor at the Massachusetts Institute of Technology from 1955 to 1963.

== Early life and education ==
Born in Brooklyn, New York, he graduated from Horace Mann School and obtained a Bachelor of Arts from Cornell University in 1923. He was the fourth generation of men in his family to share the name, the first being Houlder Hudgins, a Virginia born British naval officer who became a planter, merchant, patriot and legislator for what in his lifetime became Mathews County, Virginia.

== Career ==
Hudgins began his career as an instructor in industrial management and accounting at Cornell's School of Engineering, teaching from 1923 to 1927. He then transitioned to the corporate sector in Chicago.

From 1928 to 1932, Hudgins held various roles at Mandel Brothers department store, eventually becoming merchandise manager. His career progressed at Montgomery Ward (1933-1938) as manager of the Furniture and Home Furnishings Division, followed by executive roles at Sloane-Blabon Corporation, a linoleum manufacturer, where he served as president and later as chairman of the board. He was also the executive vice president of Alexander Smith Carpet Company.

During World War II, Hudgins was appointed director of Purchases for the War Production Board and vice chairman of the Joint Board of Procurement Policy (1942-1944). Post-war, he held several executive positions, including chairman of McLain Trucking Company from 1945 to 1952 and roles at Certainteed Products Corporation, Allied Overseas, Wilson Brothers, and Galen Van Meter.

In May 1955, Hudgins was appointed as a professor of industrial management in the School of Industrial Management at the Massachusetts Institute of Technology.

In addition to his professional activities, Hudgins was involved in various organizations such as the American Management Association and the Newcomen Society of England. He was also active in yachting, serving in leadership roles at yacht clubs and participating in races. Late in his life, he established a family genealogy that Ann Rubey Todd published as The Todd family of Virginia, now available through the internet archive.

== Personal life ==
Hudgins married Vallie K. Olson in 1934 and they had two children.
