= Falconer Bungalow Historic District =

- U.S. National Register of Historic Places
- U.S. Historic district
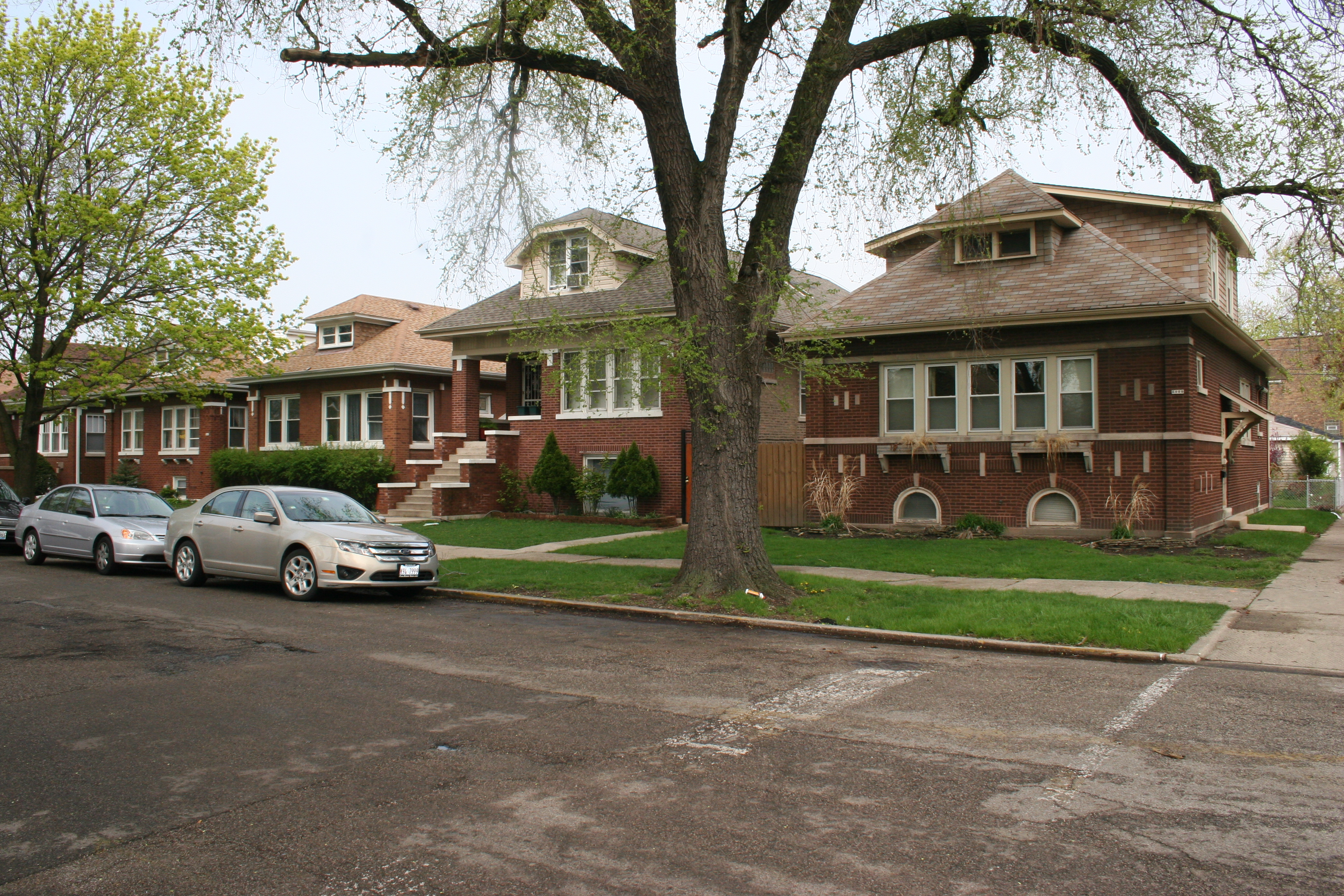

- Location within Chicago metropolitan area Location within Illinois Location within the United States
- Location: Roughly bounded by W. Wellington Ave., N. Lamon Ave., N. Laramie Ave., and the alley N of W. Diversey Ave., Chicago, Illinois
- Coordinates: 41°56′00″N 87°45′10″W
- Area: 59.2 acres (24.0 ha)
- Architectural style: Chicago bungalow
- MPS: Chicago Bungalows MPS
- NRHP reference No.: 07000114
- Added to NRHP: March 7, 2007

The Falconer Bungalow Historic District is a residential historic district in the Belmont Cragin neighborhood of Chicago, Illinois. The district comprises 348 Chicago bungalows built from 1915 to 1931. As homeownership became more affordable in early twentieth century Chicago, the bungalow became popular as an affordable and easily replicable home style, and tens of thousands of the homes were built throughout the city. While more industrial than average, the Belmont Cragin area was otherwise typical of the new bungalow neighborhoods, as it was an underdeveloped area on the outskirts of the city. Laughlin Falconer, for whom the district is named, owned and farmed on the land before dividing it and selling it to developers in 1913. Architects Ernest Braucher and Johan F. Knudson designed most of the bungalows in the district; both architects frequently gave their houses full-length, open-air front porches, and the district has one of the city's most significant collections of open front porch bungalows as a result.

The district was added to the National Register of Historic Places on March 7, 2007.

== History ==
In the mid-1800s, the Scottish immigrant Laughlin Falconer settled in the land for farming. The area was transformed into a mixture of industrial, commercial, and residential in the early decades of the 20th century.

In November 1915, home building initiated in the Falconer District. Edward H. Olsen and Henry Van Vooren started on a series of bungalows on the 4900 block of West Oakdale Avenue.

George C. Hield, a former hay dealer from Wisconsin, was the most important player in the growth of the Falconer District. He purchased most of the land subdivided by the Falconer family between 1913 and 1919.

According to the Chicago Tribune, Hield had the intention of building thirty houses of various designs, including single dwellings of the ordinary type, bungalows, and two flat buildings.

From November 1915 to April 1921, only three of 101 homes built in the district were constructed by builders other than Hield and Olsen and Van Vooren. After 1921, dozens of developers, builders, architects, and potential homeowners filled the remaining lots, building 240 properties between 1921 and 1925.

== Working-class neighborhood ==
Like other bungalows that sprang up between the northwest extensions of Chicago, the Falconer Historic District was not segregated from the industrial and manufacturing districts. The developers of the Falconer District built homes within walking distance of major areas employers.

The availability of manufacturing and clerical jobs in the Belmont Cragin community allowed extended family and adult children of a good number of bungalow owners made contributions to the household economy. This was advantageous to the Depression of the early 1930s.

One example of these cases was a Norwegian-born piano tuner at musical instrument factory Lyon and Healy on Fullerton Avenue. His oldest son worked as a pattern maker at a clothing factory, while 19-year-old-son worked as a file assistant with an electric parts manufacturer.
