= Ann Halsted House =

Historic house in Illinois, United States

- U.S. National Register of Historic Places
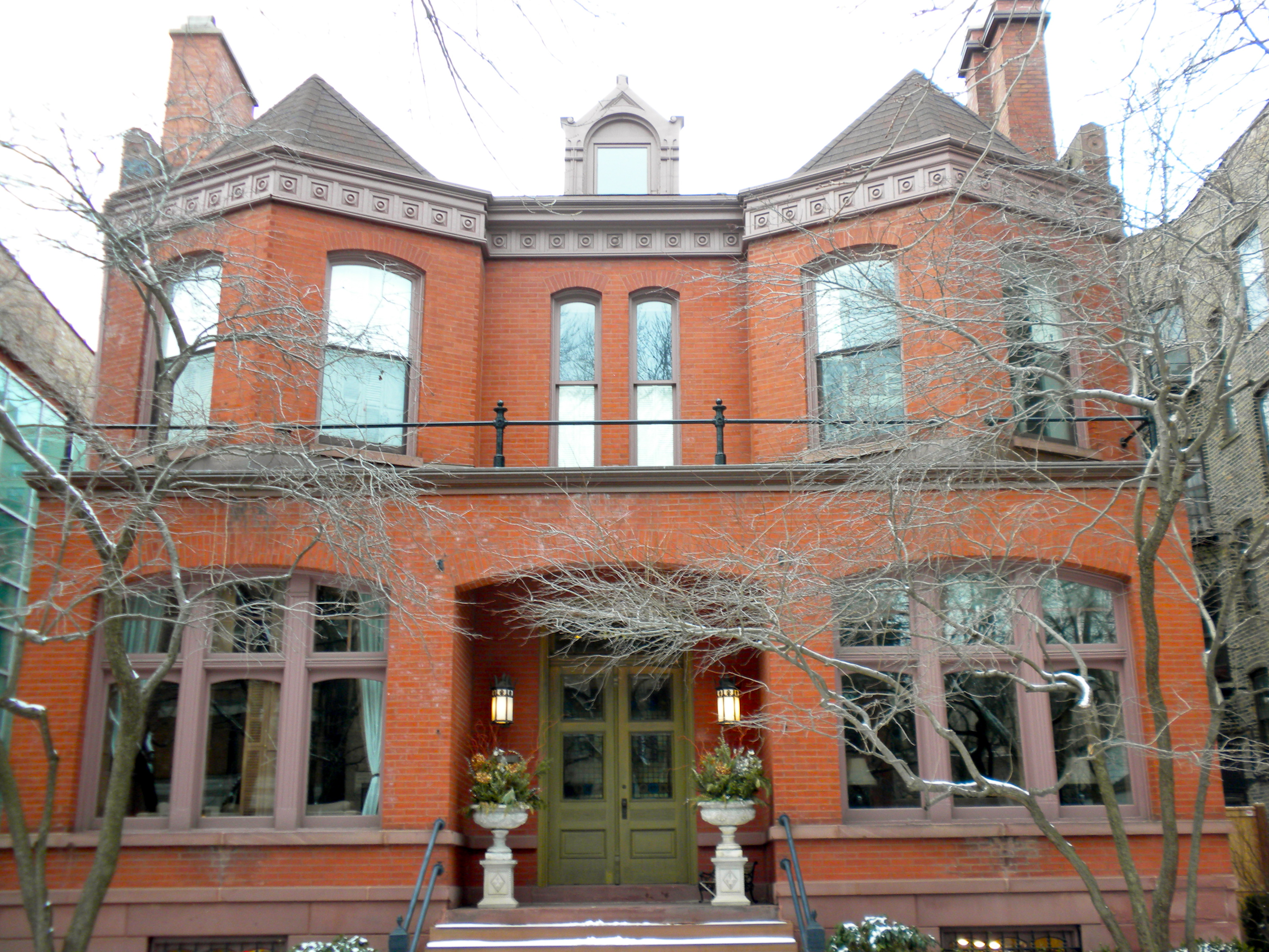

- Location within Chicago metropolitan area Location within Illinois Location within the United States
- Location: 440 Belden St., Chicago, Illinois
- Coordinates: 41°55′26″N 87°38′25″W
- Area: 0.4 acres (0.16 ha)
- Built: 1883–84
- Architect: Adler & Sullivan
- Architectural style: Queen Anne
- NRHP reference No.: 73000695
- Added to NRHP: August 17, 1973

The Ann Halsted House is a house located at 440 W. Belden Street in the Lincoln Park community area of Chicago, Illinois. Designed in 1883 and built by 1884, the house is the oldest surviving residence designed by Dankmar Adler and Louis Sullivan. The brick house is designed in the Queen Anne style, which can be seen in its pointed bay windows and the detailed brickwork on the cornices and chimneys on the sides of the house; however, the front of the home reflects a French influence. Sullivan's influence on the home's exterior can mainly be seen in the dormers at the front and back and in the pediments on the sides. The fireplace and railings inside the house are also Queen Anne style, though they too reflect early traces of Sullivan's characteristic design.

The Ann Halsted House was added to the National Register of Historic Places on August 17, 1973.

== See also ==
- National Register of Historic Places listings in North Side Chicago
