= Meekerville Historic District =

Historic district in Illinois, United States

- U.S. National Register of Historic Places
- U.S. Historic district
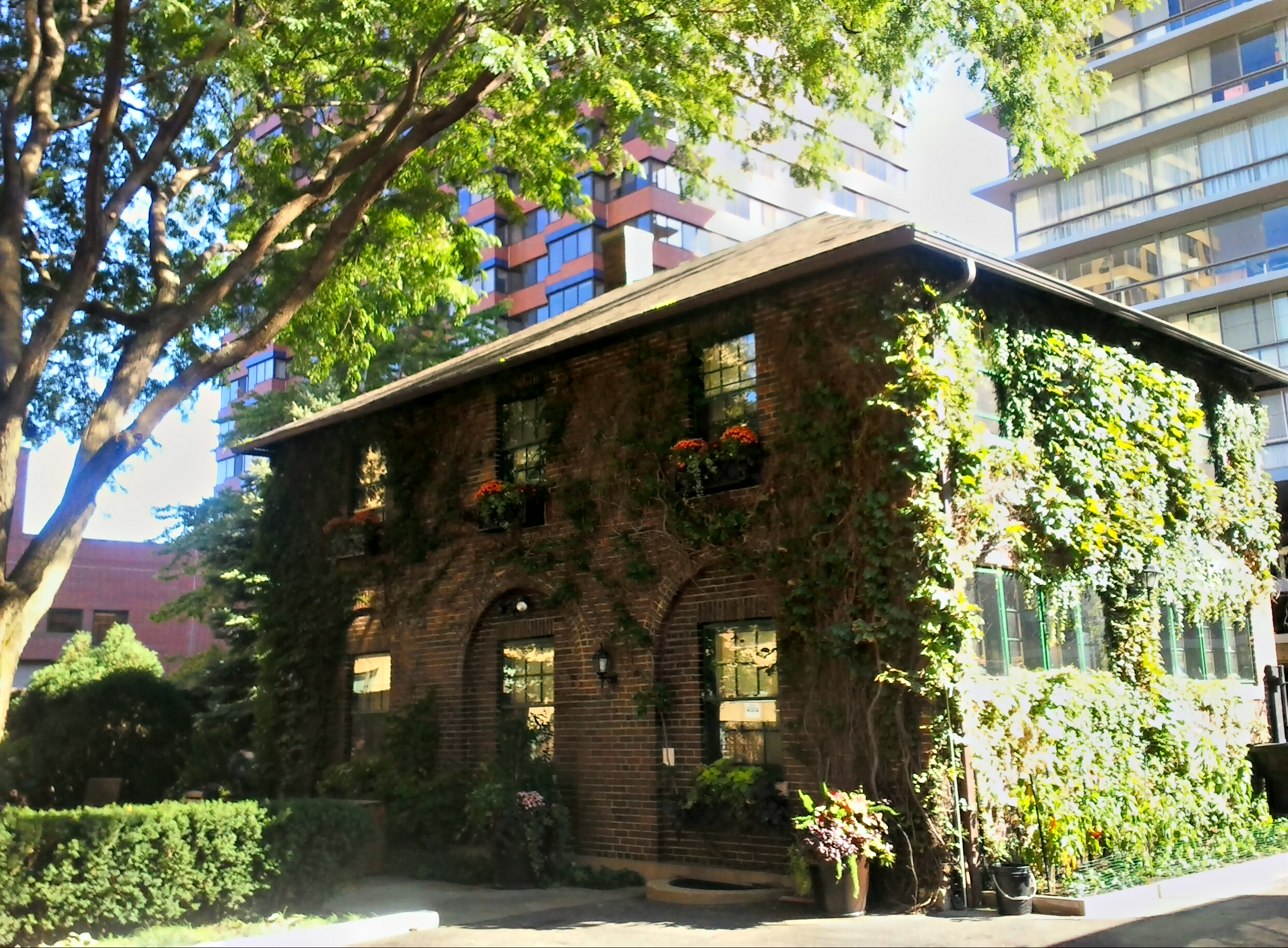
- 325 W Wellington Ave from the rear

- Location within Illinois
- Location: 303 W. Barry Avenue, 325,303-341,344 W. Wellington Avenue, 340 W. Oakdale Avenue, Lakeview, Chicago, Illinois
- Coordinates: 41°56′12″N 87°38′18″W
- NRHP reference No.: 06000383
- Added to NRHP: May 12, 2006

The Meekerville Historic District is a historic district in the Lakeview community of North Side, Chicago, Illinois.

It is composed of residential contributing properties listed on the National Register of Historic Places in Chicago.

== NRHP history ==
The district was listed on the U.S. National Register of Historic Places on May 12, 2006. The listing was announced as the featured listing in the National Park Service's weekly list of May 19, 2006.

== See also ==
- National Register of Historic Places listings in North Side Chicago
- Houses on the National Register of Historic Places in Chicago
- Lakeview, Chicago

== Gallery ==
Historic sites
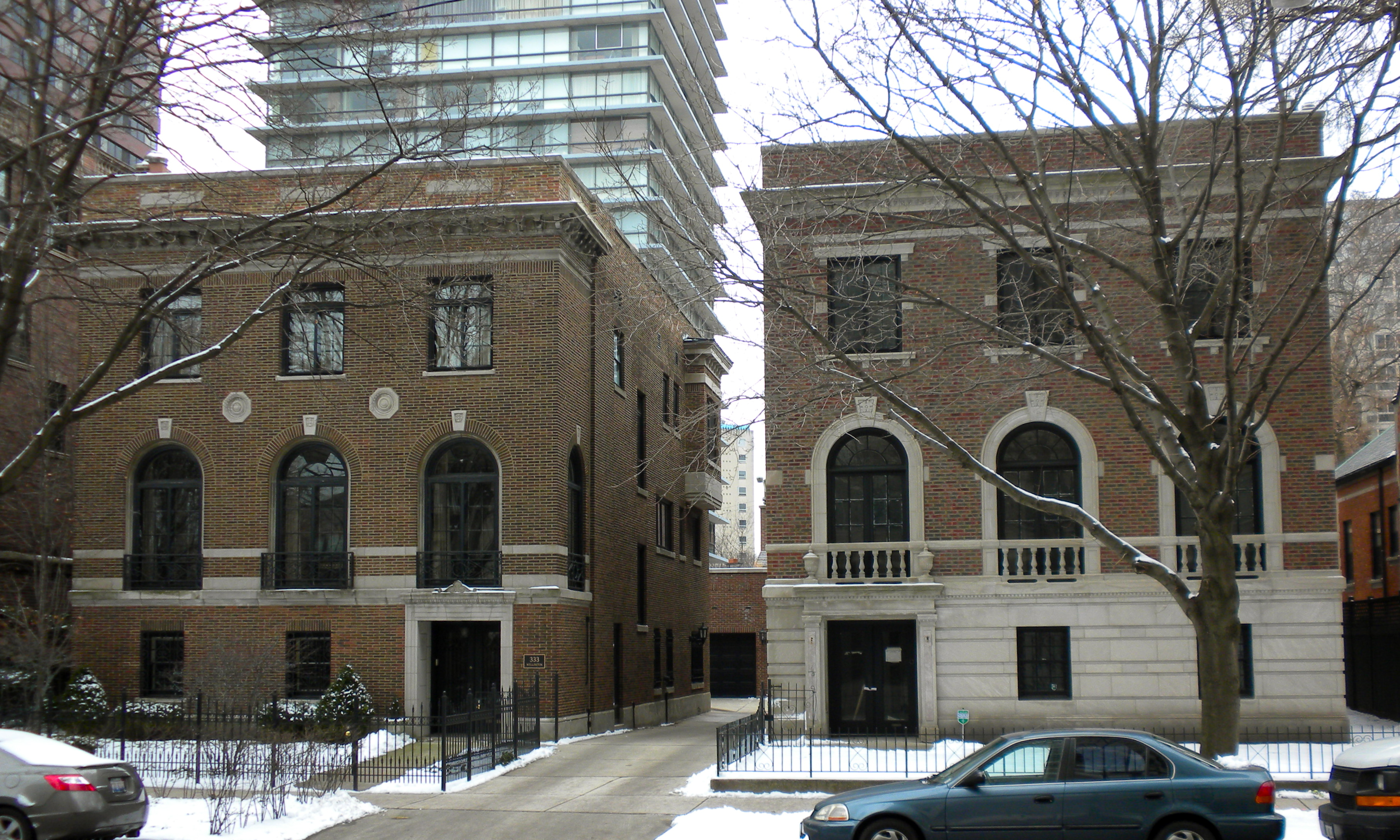
Facade of 333 W Wellington Ave.

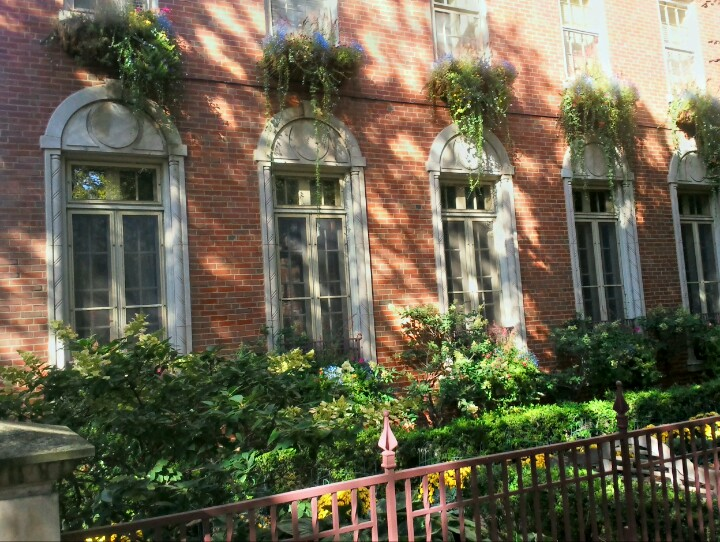
344 W Wellington Ave.

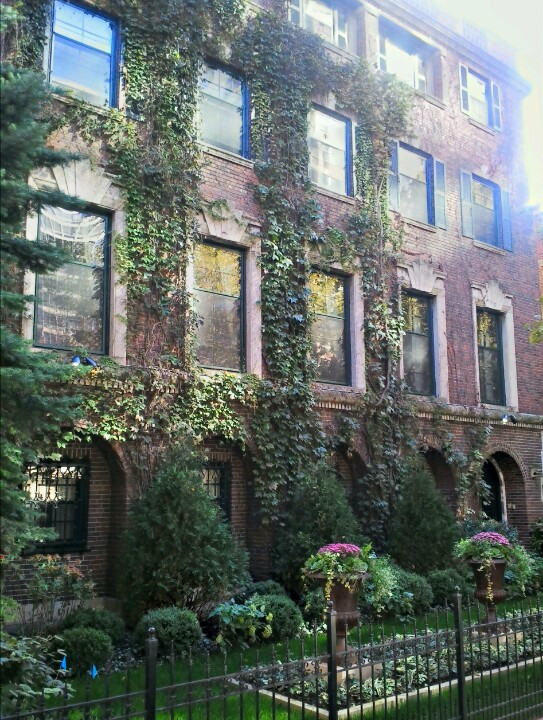
Facade of 325 W Wellington Ave.

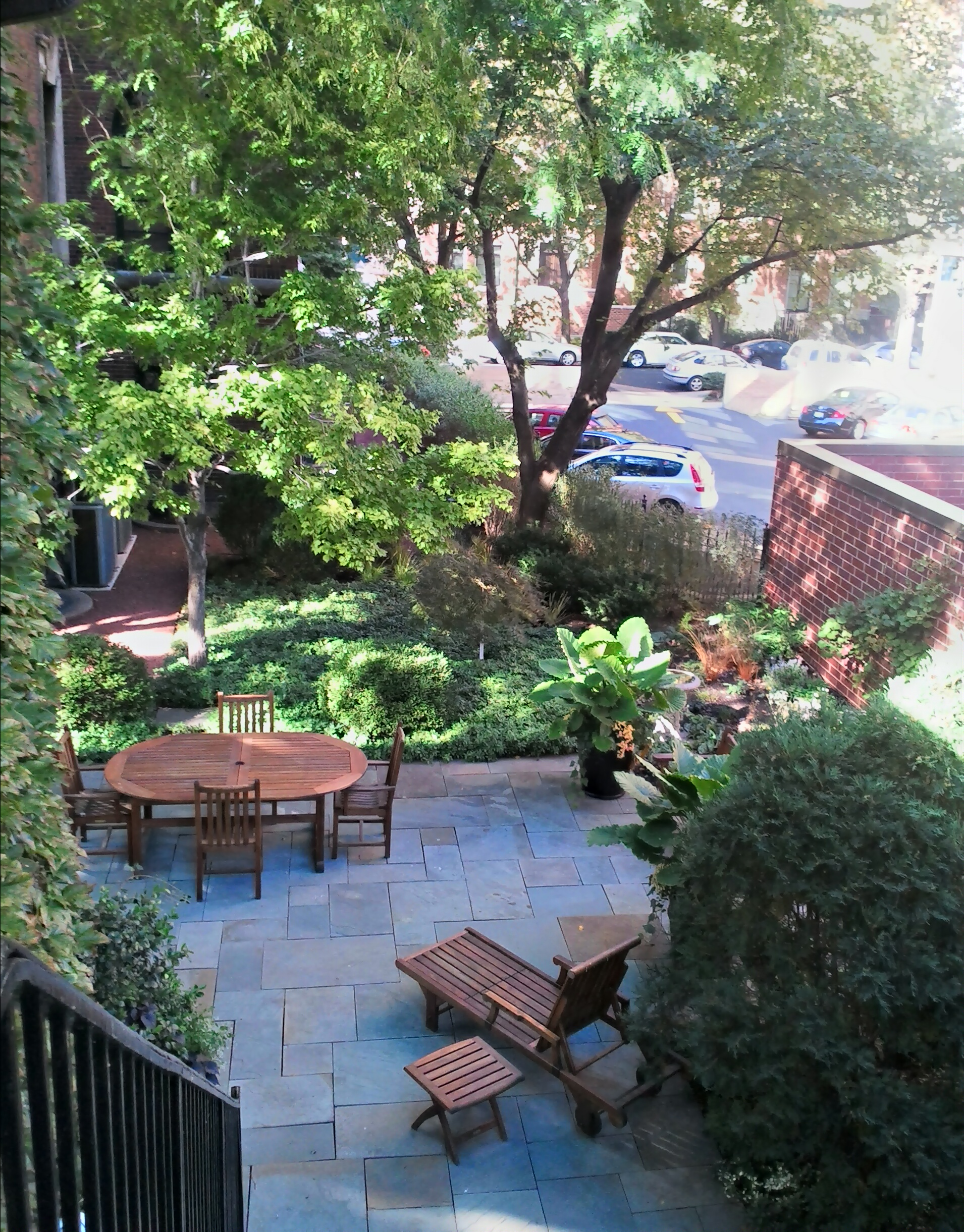
Rear courtyard of 325 W Wellington Ave.
