= Wrightwood Bungalow Historic District =

- U.S. National Register of Historic Places
- U.S. Historic district
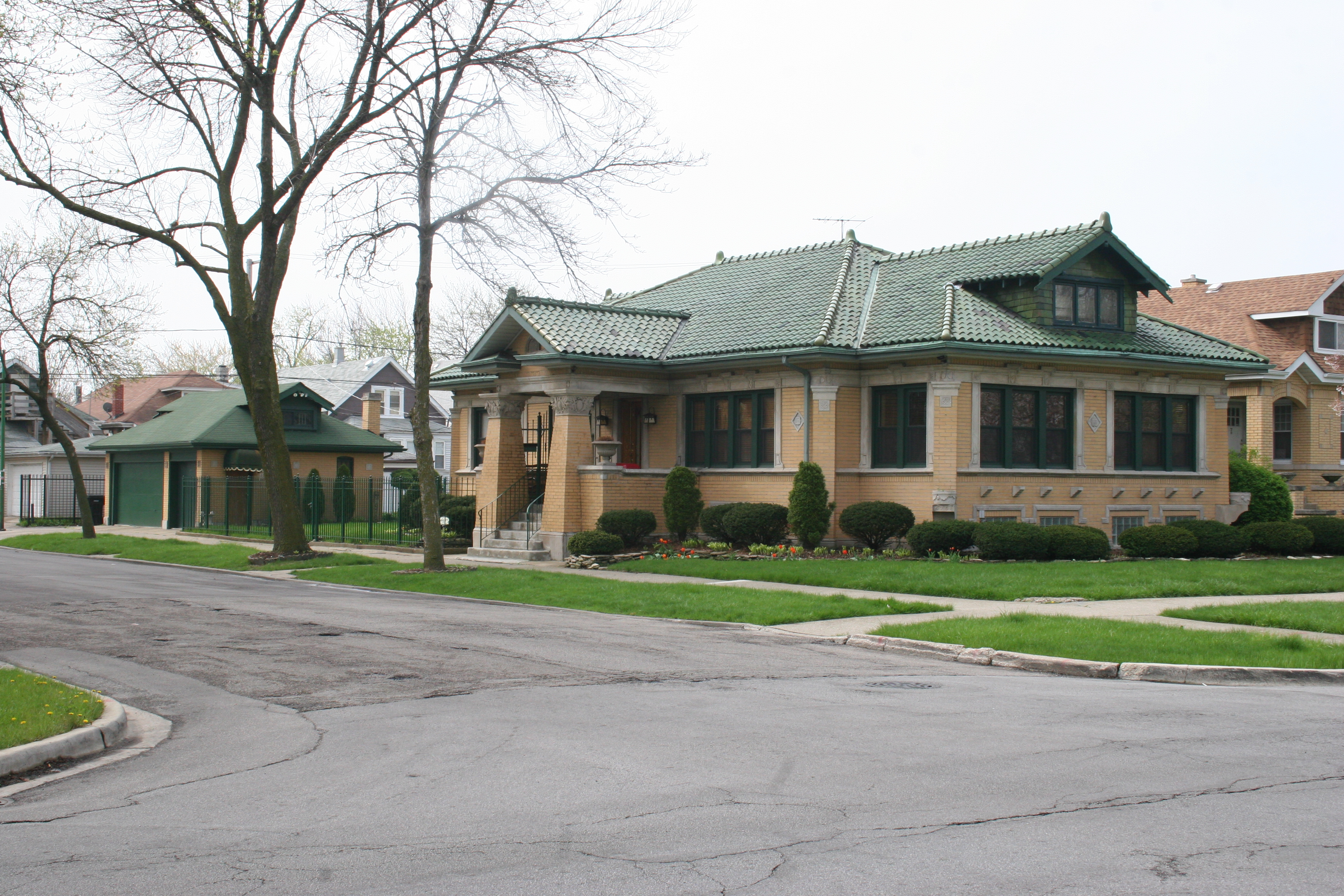

- Location within Chicago metropolitan area Location within Illinois Location within the United States
- Location: 4600 and 4700 blocks of W. Wrightwood Ave., Chicago, Illinois
- Coordinates: 41°55′42″N 87°44′39″W
- Area: 11 acres (4.5 ha)
- Architectural style: Chicago Bungalow
- MPS: Chicago Bungalows MPS
- NRHP reference No.: 04000975
- Added to NRHP: September 15, 2004

The Wrightwood Bungalow Historic District is a residential historic district encompassing the 4600 and 4700 blocks of Wrightwood Avenue in the Belmont Cragin neighborhood of Chicago, Illinois. The district includes 58 houses built between 1916 and 1926, 55 of which are Chicago bungalows. As homeownership became more accessible in early twentieth century Chicago, the bungalow became popular as an affordable home design, and tens of thousands of the houses were built throughout Chicago. Like many of Chicago's bungalow-heavy neighborhoods, both the district and the Belmont Cragin neighborhood in general saw little residential development before the bungalow boom; however, the area was much more industrial than most similar neighborhoods. While several developers built bungalows in the district, the Stolzner Construction Company built over half of them, including every bungalow on the 4600 block. The company's architect, Joseph Klafter, differentiated the bungalows by changing details such as their color, entrance position, and dormer design.

The district was added to the National Register of Historic Places on September 15, 2004.
