= Yondorf Block and Hall =

- U.S. National Register of Historic Places
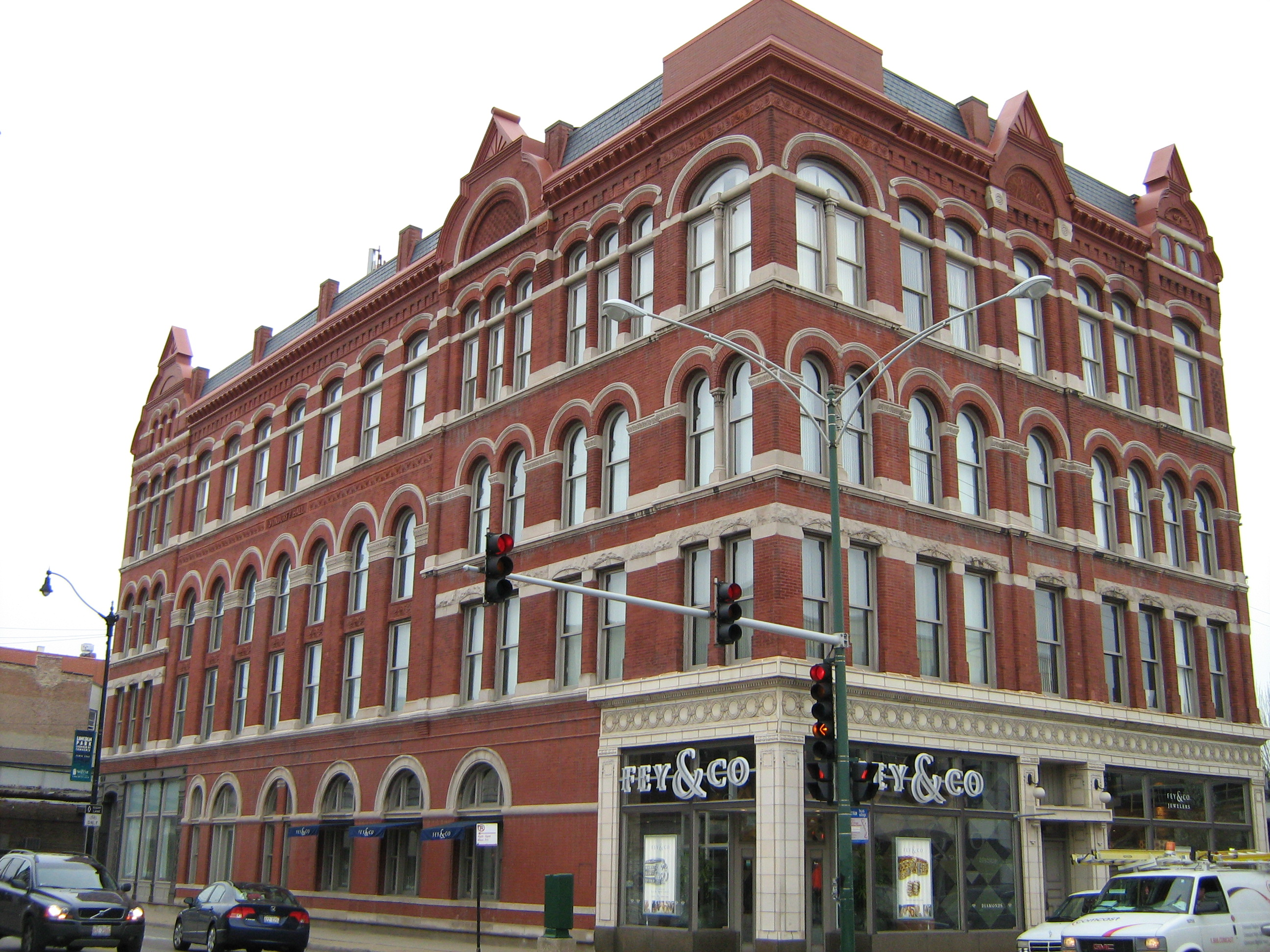

- Location within Chicago metropolitan area Location within Illinois Location within the United States
- Location: 758 W. North Ave., Chicago, Illinois
- Coordinates: 41°54′40″N 87°38′53″W
- Area: less than one acre
- Built: 1887
- Architect: Frederick Ahlschlager
- Architectural style: Victorian Gothic, Romanesque Revival
- NRHP reference No.: 84000297
- Added to NRHP: November 13, 1984

The Yondorf Block and Hall is a historic building at 758 W. North Avenue in the Lincoln Park neighborhood of Chicago, Illinois. The building was built in 1887 to serve as a meeting hall for the various social organizations in Lincoln Park; while its first floor was dedicated to retail space, it had six meeting rooms on its upper floors. Chapters of national fraternal organizations and ethnic clubs formed by immigrants in the neighborhood met in the building, and its largest hall hosted speeches and performances as well. Designed by Frederick Ahlschlager, the building combines Victorian Gothic and Romanesque Revival elements. While its terra cotta clad storefronts and metal cornice are typical of the former style, its use of decorative brickwork and stone is inspired by the latter.

The building was added to the National Register of Historic Places on November 13, 1984.
