= Castlewood Terrace =

- U.S. National Register of Historic Places
- U.S. Historic district
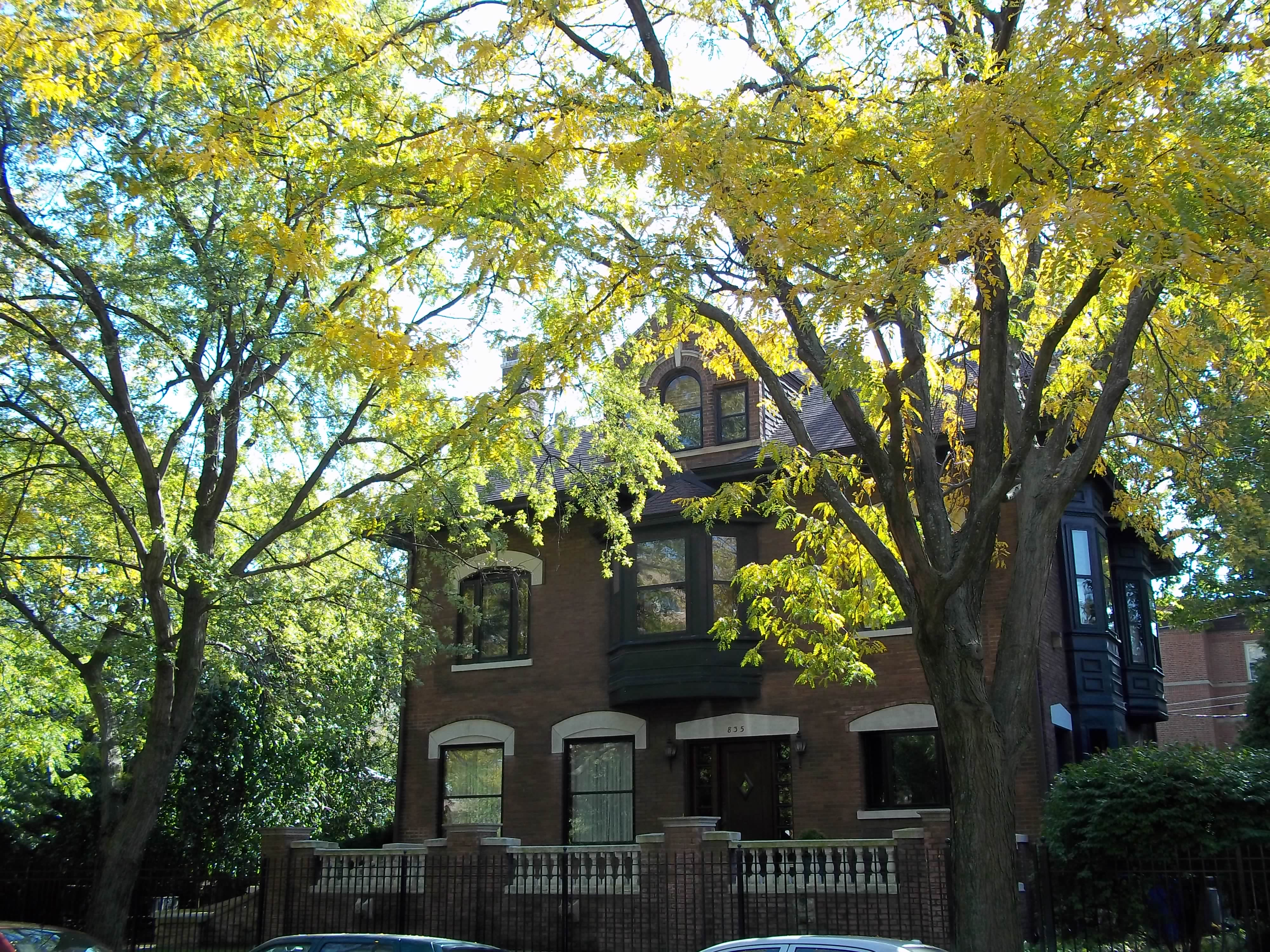

- Location within Chicago metropolitan area Location within Illinois Location within the United States
- Location: 819-959 W. Castlewood Terr., Chicago, Illinois
- Coordinates: 41°58′14″N 87°39′06″W
- Area: 8 acres (3.2 ha)
- NRHP reference No.: 09000232
- Added to NRHP: September 3, 2009

Castlewood Terrace is a block-long street and residential historic district in the Uptown neighborhood of Chicago, Illinois. The district includes 26 single-family houses built between 1897 and 1927. The street is highly unusual compared to its surroundings, as both Uptown and Chicago's lakeshore in general were built up with high-rise apartments in the early twentieth century; Castlewood Terrace residents resisted high-rise construction for decades after the street's development. Most of the houses are two to three story brick structures with spacious lots and front driveways, giving the street visual consistency despite the many different architectural styles used in its homes. Some of these architectural styles include Tudor Revival, Renaissance Revival, Foursquare, Colonial Revival, and Queen Anne.

The district was added to the National Register of Historic Places on September 3, 2009.
