= Charles N. Loucks House =

Historic house in Illinois, United States

- U.S. National Register of Historic Places
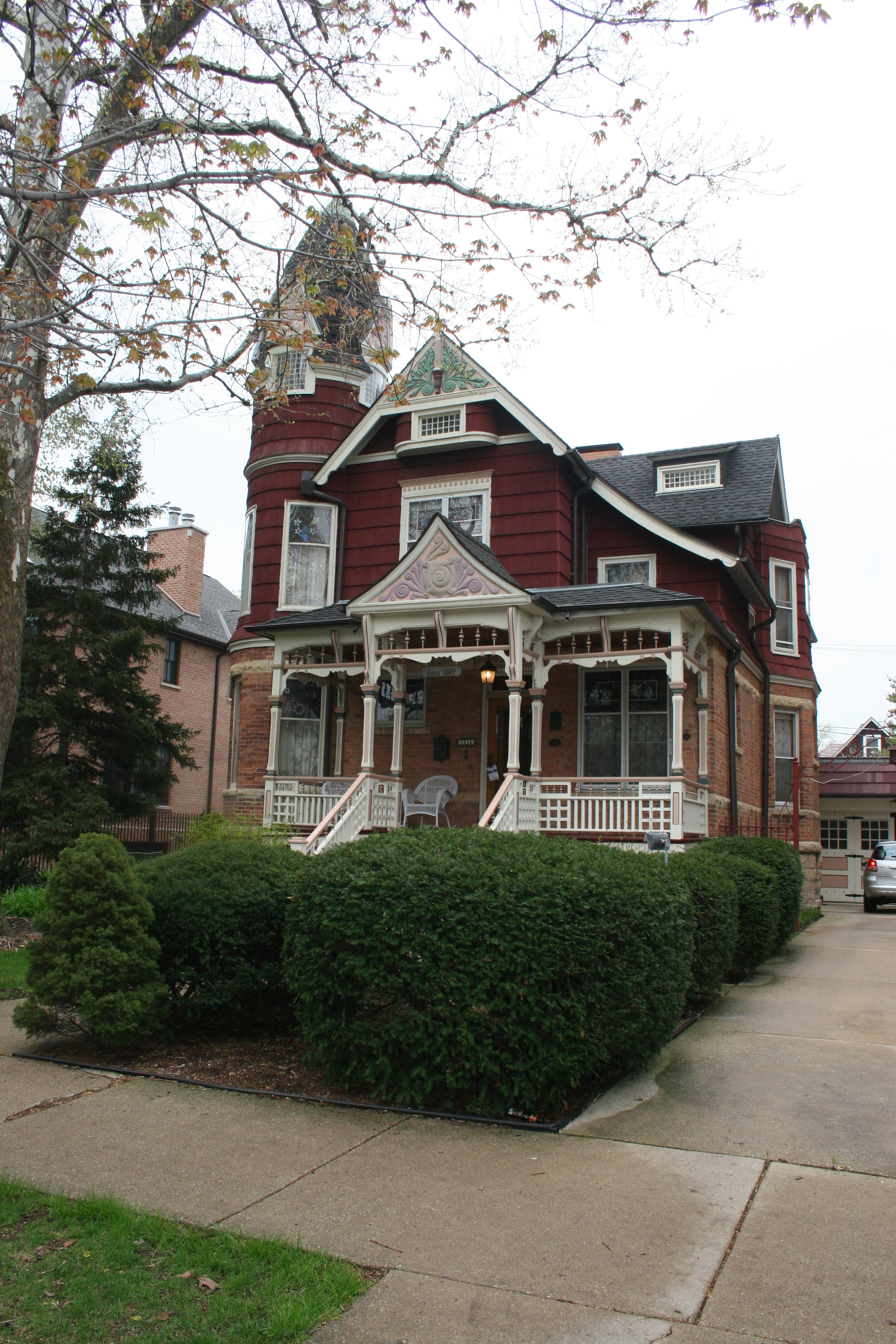

- Location within Chicago metropolitan area Location within Illinois Location within the United States
- Location: 3926 N. Keeler Ave., Chicago, Illinois
- Coordinates: 41°57′09″N 87°43′58″W
- Area: less than one acre
- Built: 1889
- Architect: Clarence H. Tabor
- Architectural style: Queen Anne
- NRHP reference No.: 84001006
- Added to NRHP: February 9, 1984

The Charles N. Loucks House is a historic house at 3926 N. Keeler Avenue in the Irving Park neighborhood of Chicago, Illinois. The house was built in 1889 for Charles N. Loucks, a real estate planner who developed much of Irving Park, and his family. Clarence H. Tabor, an architect who worked for Loucks' real estate company, designed the Queen Anne house. The house's design features a front porch with carved wooden trim and a pediment, a front-facing gable with a floral design at its peak, and a tower with a conical roof. The interior includes distinctive floral-patterned art glass windows, which include both clear and stained glass and were inspired by English and Japanese design.

The house was added to the National Register of Historic Places on February 9, 1984.
