= Hermitage Apartments =

Apartment building in Chicago, Illinois

- U.S. National Register of Historic Places
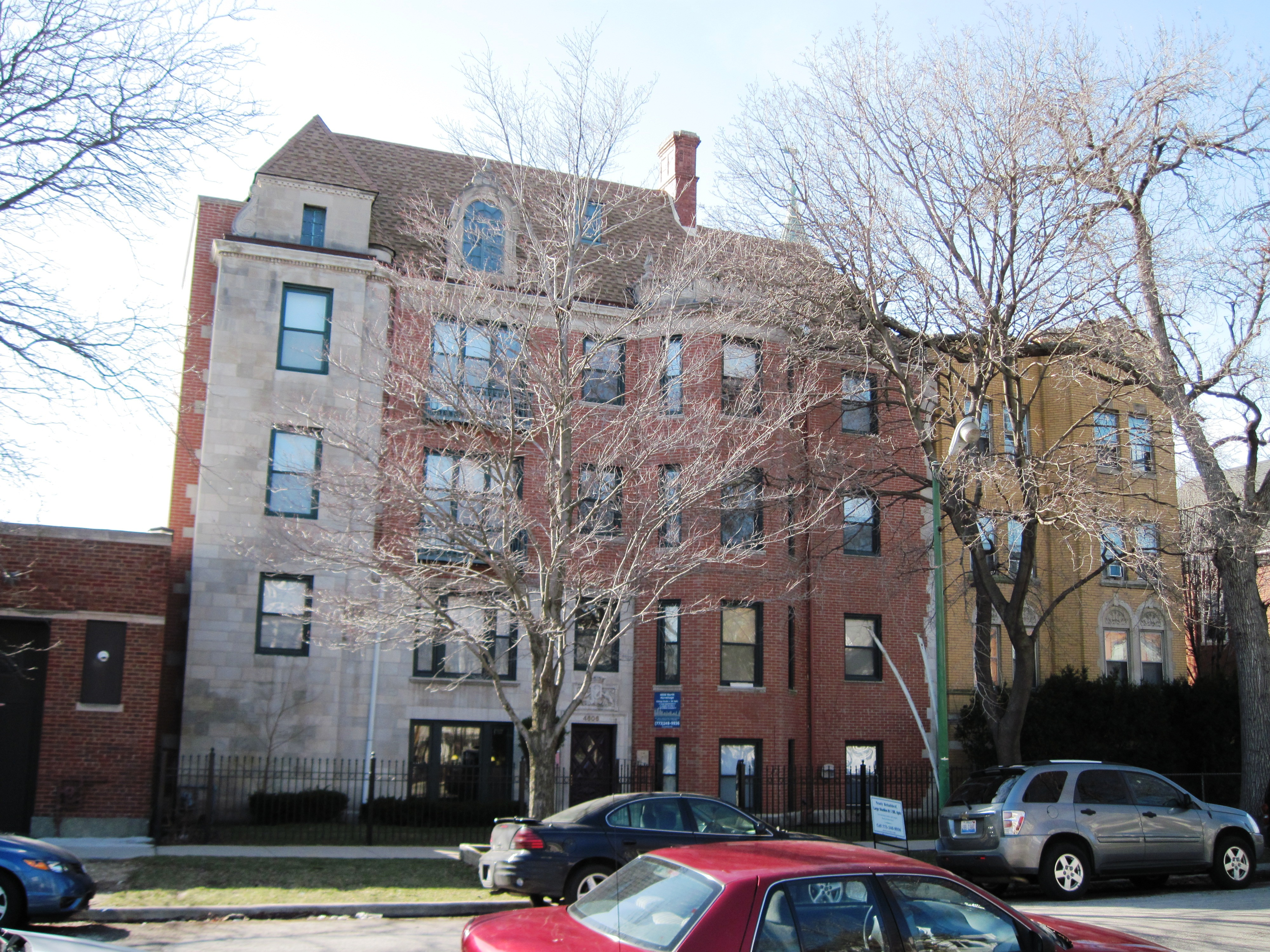

- Location within Chicago metropolitan area Location within Illinois Location within the United States
- Location: 4606 N. Hermitage Ave., Chicago, Illinois
- Coordinates: 41°57′57″N 87°40′22″W
- Area: 0.2 acres (0.081 ha)
- Built: 1927
- Architect: Jensen, Jens J.
- NRHP reference No.: 85000266
- Added to NRHP: February 14, 1985

Hermitage Apartments is an apartment building located at 4606 N. Hermitage Ave. in the Uptown community area of Chicago, Illinois. The common-corridor apartment building was designed by Chicago architect Jens J. Jensen in 1927. The building's design is highly irregular; it features five bays, each with a different design. The first bay from the left is faced in limestone, the second and third bays are faced in limestone on the first floor and brick on higher floors, and the fourth and fifth bays are faced entirely in brick. In addition, only the first and fourth bays are projecting, and no two bays have the same sized windows. The roof of the building exhibits the same irregularity, as it includes three dormers with different designs, a chimney, a parapet, and a cone-shaped tower topped with a weather vane. In its National Register nomination, the building's design was described as "old-fashioned" and evocative of "the Old World city from a time before the invention of railroads or factories", and looking at the building was described as like "looking at five narrow old houses".

Hermitage Apartments was added to the National Register of Historic Places on February 14, 1985.
