= Covent Hotel =

- U.S. National Register of Historic Places
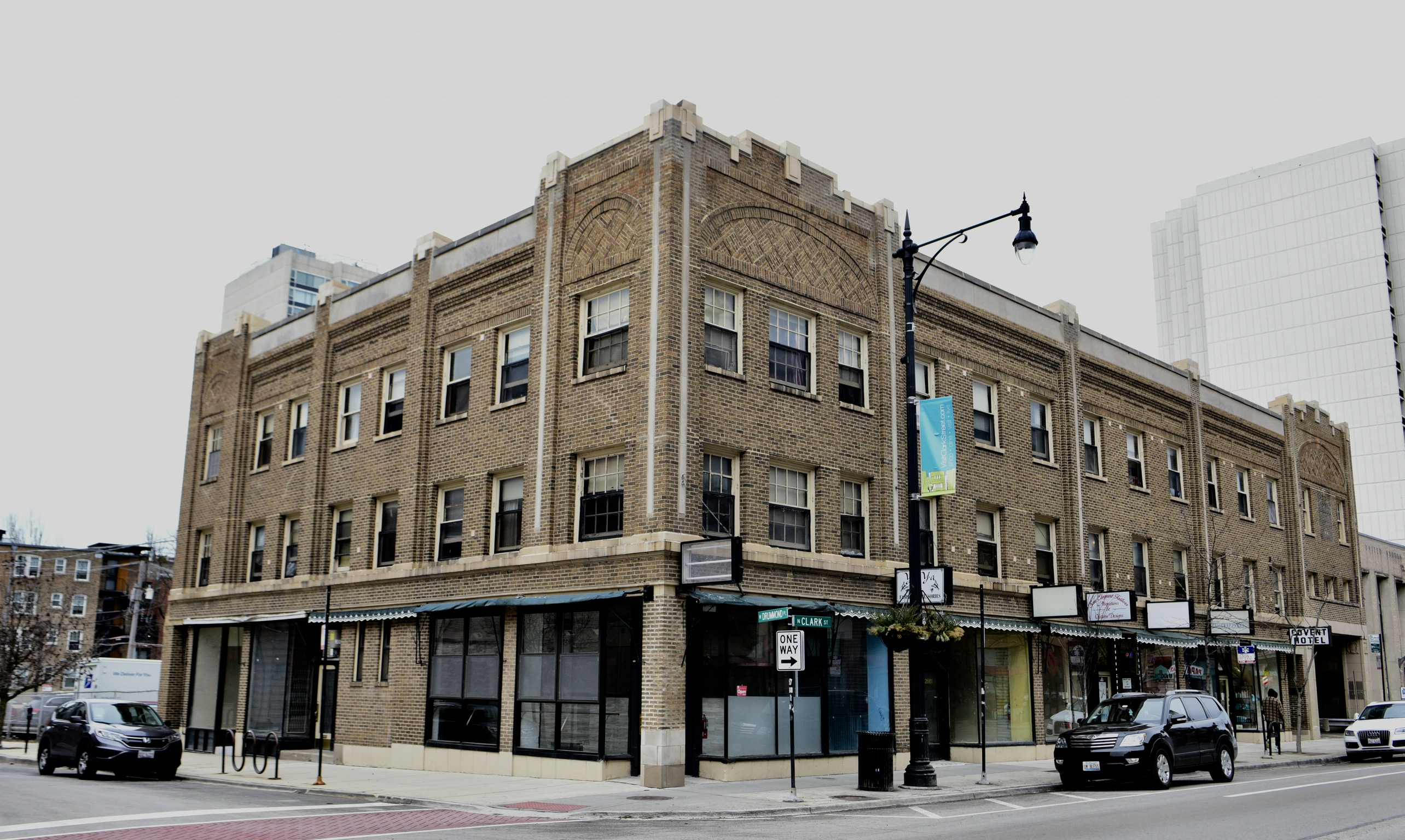

- Location within Chicago metropolitan area Location within Illinois Location within the United States
- Location: 2653-65 N. Clark St., Chicago, Illinois
- Coordinates: 41°55′52″N 87°38′38″W
- Built: 1915; 111 years ago
- Architect: Frank E. Davidson
- Architectural style: Classical Revival
- MPS: Residential Hotels in Chicago, 1880-1930
- NRHP reference No.: 100001561
- Added to NRHP: September 5, 2017

The Covent Hotel is a historic residential hotel at 2653-65 N. Clark Street in the Lincoln Park neighborhood of Chicago, Illinois. Built in 1915, the hotel was one of the many residential hotels constructed in early twentieth century Chicago to house the city's growing single working-class population. Covent Hotel was a rooming hotel, a subtype of residential hotel that exclusively offered single rooms with few amenities. Like many rooming hotels, the Covent Hotel housed commercial space on its first floor, including a restaurant to provide convenient nearby meals for its residents. Architect Frank E. Davidson designed the Classical Revival building, which features brick piers and a parapet.

The building was added to the National Register of Historic Places on September 5, 2017.
