= Best Brewing Company of Chicago Building =

- U.S. National Register of Historic Places
- U.S. Historic district
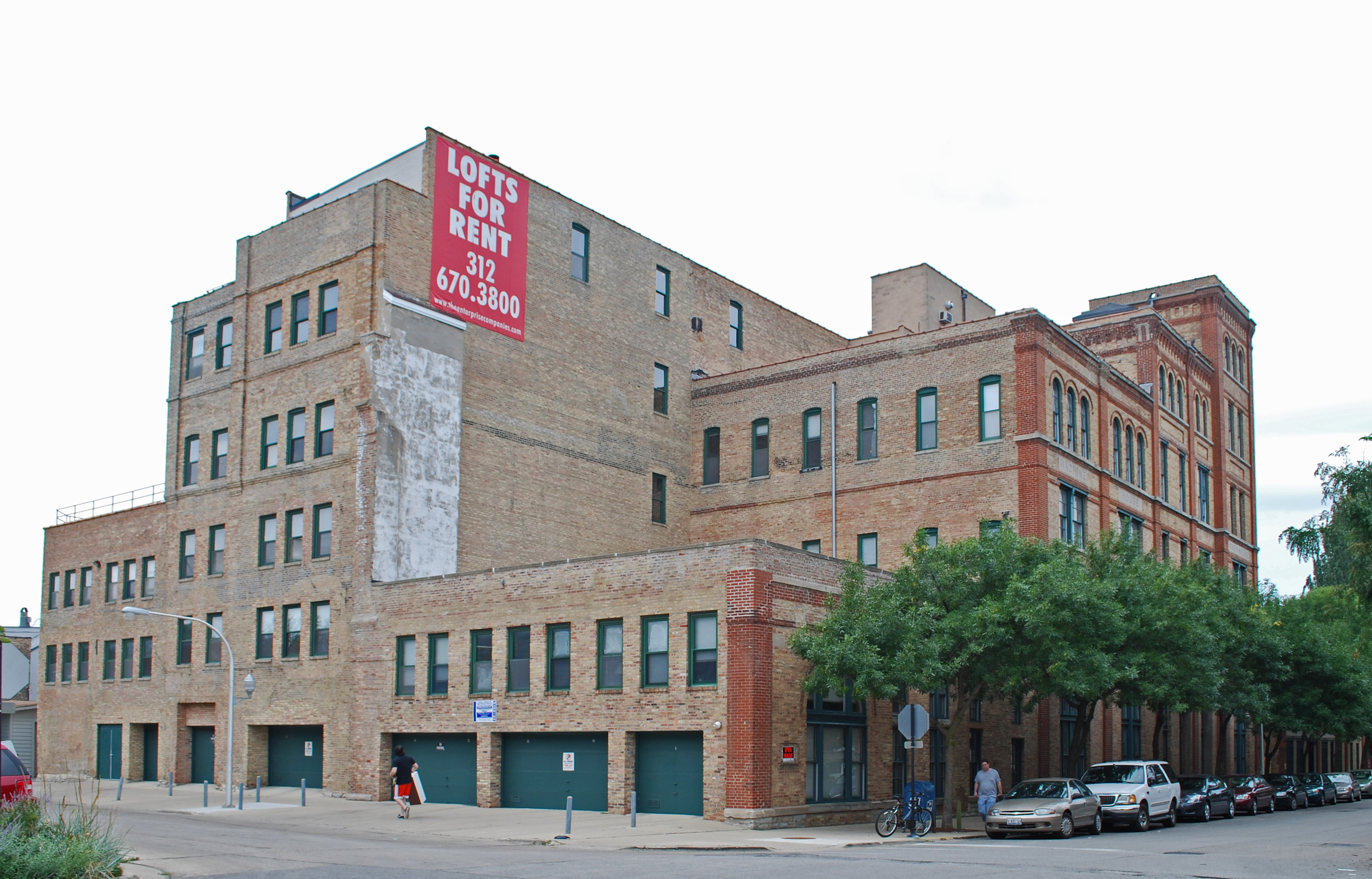

- Location within Chicago metropolitan area Location within Illinois Location within the United States
- Location: 1315-1317 W. Fletcher, Chicago, Illinois
- Coordinates: 41°56′19″N 87°39′42″W
- Area: 0.3 acres (0.12 ha)
- Built: 1893
- Architect: Oscar Beyer
- NRHP reference No.: 87001263
- Added to NRHP: July 30, 1987

The Best Brewing Company of Chicago Building is a historic brewery building at 1315-1317 W. Fletcher Street in the Lakeview neighborhood of Chicago, Illinois. The building was built in 1893 for the Best Brewing Company of Chicago, replacing a smaller 1885 brewery on the site that the company had bought in 1891. The company, which was founded by the Hasterlik family, was one of many German-owned breweries in Chicago at the time. Architect Oscar Beyer designed the building, which features decorative brickwork, arched windows, and a cornice. The company brewed beer at the plant until Prohibition, when it switched to other goods such as ice and malt syrup. After Prohibition ended, the company began brewing beer again, and it brought innovations to the Chicago market such as canned beer and private labels for the chain stores it sold to. While the company was bought out by the Metropolis Brewing Company of New York City in 1950, beer was brewed at the plant until 1961.

The building was added to the National Register of Historic Places on July 30, 1987.
