= Building at 2440 N. Lakeview Avenue =

Apartment building in Chicago, Illinois

- U.S. National Register of Historic Places
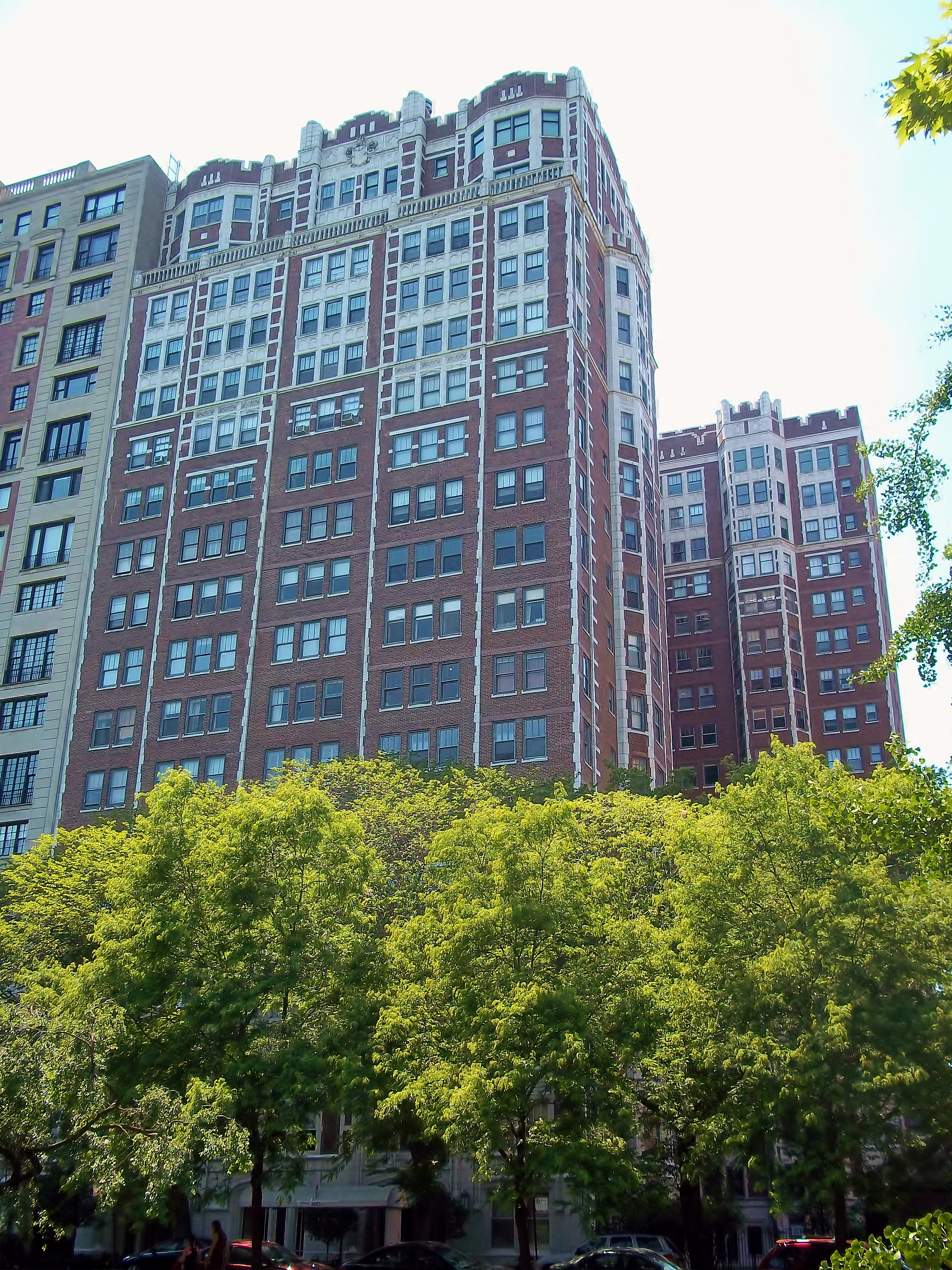

- Location within Chicago metropolitan area Location within Illinois Location within the United States
- Location: 2440 N. Lakeview Ave., Chicago, Illinois
- Coordinates: 41°55′36″N 87°38′23″W
- Area: 0.7 acres (0.28 ha)
- Built: 1926-27
- Architect: Rissman & Hirschfeld
- Architectural style: Tudor Revival
- NRHP reference No.: 11000847
- Added to NRHP: November 22, 2011

The Building at 2440 N. Lakeview Avenue is a historic apartment building in the Lincoln Park neighborhood of Chicago, Illinois. Built in 1926–27, the eighteen-story building was one of Chicago's many luxury apartment buildings constructed along Lake Michigan in the early twentieth century. The building used a semi-cooperative ownership model, in which the residents of the largest apartments had an ownership stake in the building while smaller units were rented; the cooperative model and its variations were popular with luxury apartments, as they gave residents control over how the building was run and who could live there. Architects Rissman & Hirschfeld designed the Tudor Revival building; while the Tudor Revival was one of many revival styles that became popular in the early twentieth century, it was relatively uncommon among Chicago's luxury apartments. The building's design features terra cotta arches around the entrances, ornamental terra cotta panels between the windows of the upper and lower floors, a balustrade atop the sixteenth floor, and a two-story penthouse with a broken parapet.

The building was added to the National Register of Historic Places on November 22, 2011.
