= Building at 320 West Oakdale Avenue =

Apartment building in Chicago, Illinois

- Building at 320 West Oakdale
- U.S. National Register of Historic Places
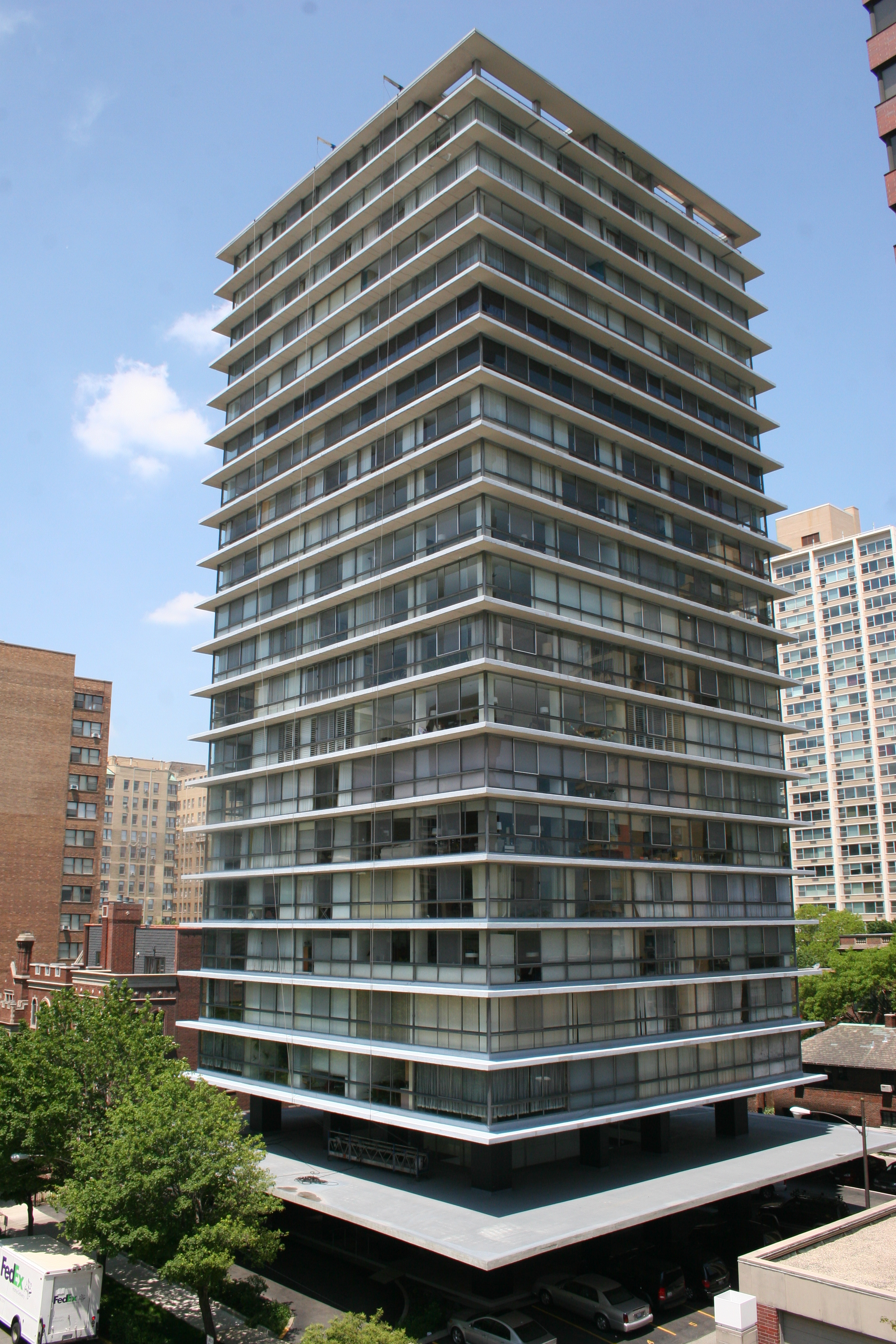

- Location within Chicago metropolitan area Location within Illinois Location within the United States
- Location: 320 West Oakdale, Chicago, Illinois
- Coordinates: 41°56′09″N 87°38′21″W
- Area: less than one acre
- Built: 1953
- Architect: Milton M. Schwartz
- Architectural style: International Style
- NRHP reference No.: 13000184
- Added to NRHP: April 23, 2013

The building at 320 West Oakdale is a 21-story International Style skyscraper designed by Milton M. Schwartz in Chicago, Illinois.

== History ==
The building at 320 West Oakdale is representative of the apartment building boom in Chicago, Illinois in the 1950s and 1960s. Milton M. Schwartz served as the building's architect, contractor, and developer, and the building was his first major design. As such, he had complete control over the creative direction of the building, and so was able to tailor it to his interests. Schwartz intended the building to serve as luxury apartments for the city elite. The apartment was designed so that residences had windows in three or four directions. Rooms were designed to resemble single-story ranch homes. The building was one of the first completely air conditioned all-glass apartments in Chicago. Stark in its repetition and simplicity, it is a good example of the International Style. The building was highlighted in a 1955 Architectural Forum article about recent Chicago apartment buildings. In the article, it was compared favorably to nearby works by Ludwig Mies van der Rohe and Skidmore, Owings & Merrill. On April 23, 2013, the building was recognized by the National Park Service with a listing on the National Register of Historic Places.

== Architecture ==
The skyscraper rises 21 stories on a reinforced concrete foundation. The Lake View development in on the north side of Oakdale Avenue at the northern terminus of Commonwealth Avenue. It was built to house 57 residential units, with three on each level starting with the fourth floor; the third floor also had four units. Each floor has full-height glass windows on all sides. Floor slabs extend 3 feet (0.91 m) from the exterior walls on floors 3 through 21. However, the ledge over the main entrance is twice as long so that the entryway is protected from ice. The lobby occupies the first two stories. The penthouses on the top floor also have sunroofs.
