= East Ravenswood Historic District =

- U.S. National Register of Historic Places
- U.S. Historic district
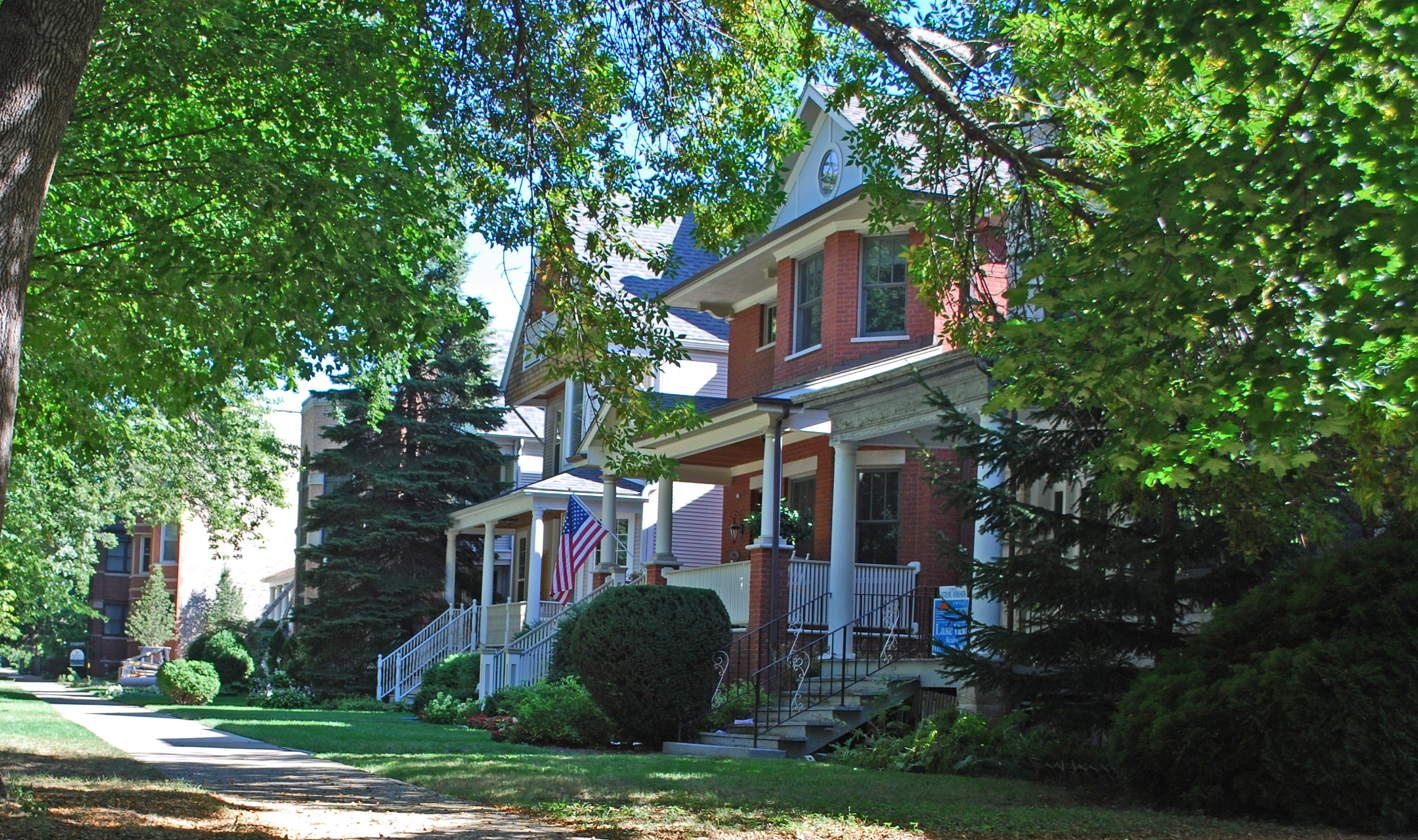

- Location within Chicago metropolitan area Location within Illinois Location within the United States
- Location: Roughly bounded by Lawrence Ave., Clark St., Irving Park Rd. and Ravenswood St., Chicago, Illinois
- Coordinates: 41°57′37″N 87°40′09″W
- Area: 247 acres (100 ha)
- NRHP reference No.: 91001364
- Added to NRHP: September 3, 1991

The East Ravenswood Historic District is a primarily residential historic district in the Ravenswood neighborhood of Chicago, Illinois. Constructed between 1880 and 1940, the buildings in the district include the first parts of Ravenswood to be developed. Ravenswood was one of Chicago's first suburban neighborhoods, and the area's many trees and proximity to the Chicago River appealed to residents looking for less urbanized surroundings. Transit connections, including the new Ravenswood branch of the Chicago 'L', and the growth of Chicago as a whole brought new residents and greater density to the neighborhood over the ensuing decades. The district is mainly composed of houses and small apartment buildings, the designs of which reflect the transition from the Queen Anne and Victorian designs of the late nineteenth century to the Prairie School and revival styles of the twentieth. It is also noted for its many churches, which represent the variety of religious denominations in the neighborhood and showcase religious architecture of the period.

The district was added to the National Register of Historic Places on September 3, 1991.
