= Malden Towers =

Apartment building in Chicago, Illinois

- U.S. National Register of Historic Places
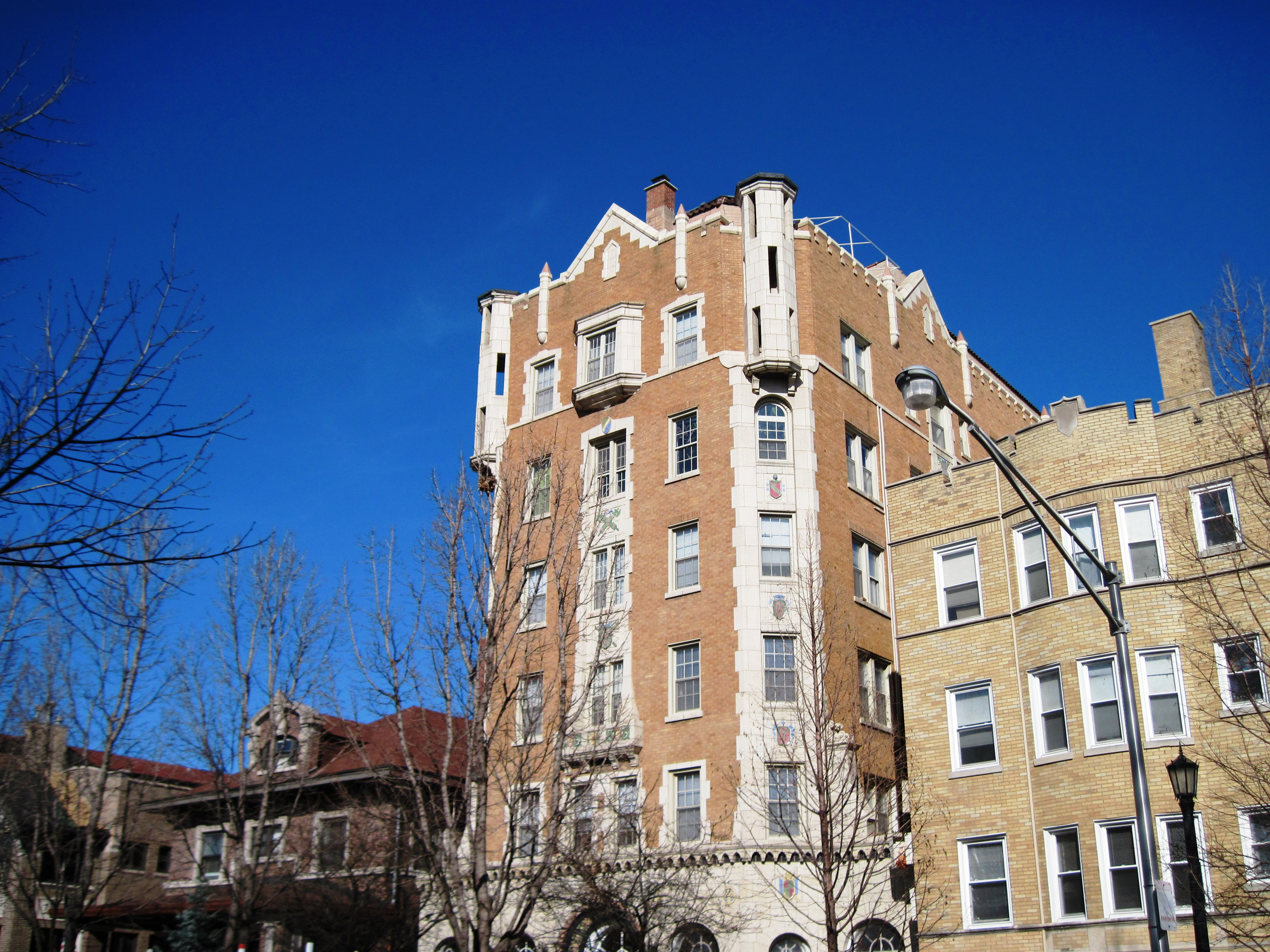

- Location within Chicago metropolitan area Location within Illinois Location within the United States
- Location: 4521 N. Malden St., Chicago, Illinois
- Coordinates: 41°57′51″N 87°39′43″W
- Area: 0.2 acres (0.081 ha)
- Built: 1928-29
- Architect: N. T. Ronneberg
- Architectural style: Medieval Spanish
- NRHP reference No.: 83003560
- Added to NRHP: December 8, 1983

The Malden Towers are a historic apartment building at 4521 N. Malden Street in the Uptown neighborhood of Chicago, Illinois. The building was built in 1928–29, shortly before the Great Depression ended Chicago's prolific apartment construction of the early twentieth century. Architect N. T. Ronneberg designed the building in the style of a medieval Spanish castle. Ronneberg's design features a brick and terra cotta exterior with turrets at the front corners, arched first-floor windows, painted ornamental elements such as shields and fasces, and a parapet with battlements. The building thrived and attracted wealthy tenants despite the impending Depression, and in later years Bob Hope was rumored to be a resident.

The building was added to the National Register of Historic Places on December 8, 1983.
