= Building at 5510 North Sheridan =

Apartment building in Chicago, Illinois

- U.S. National Register of Historic Places
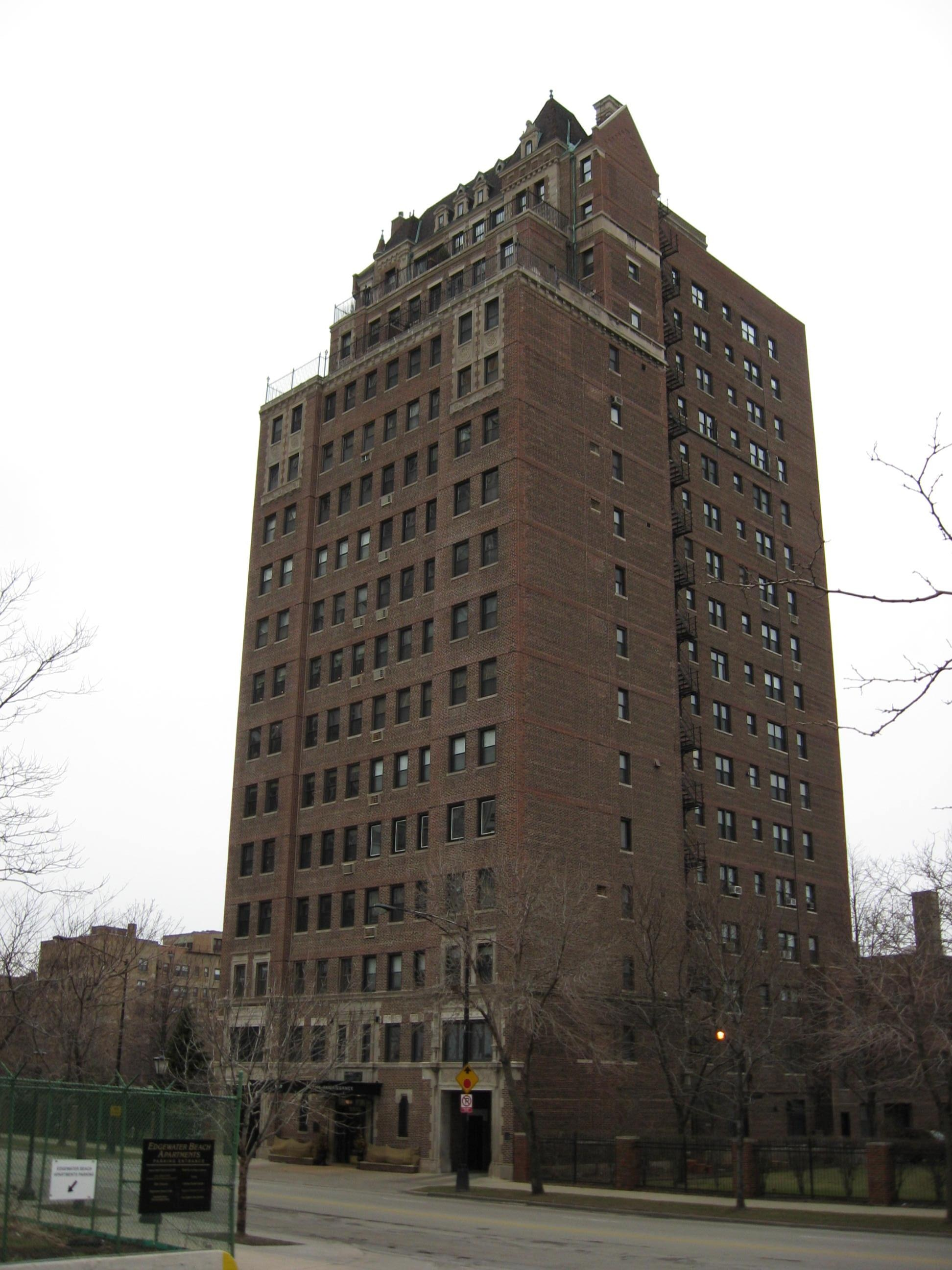

- Location within Chicago metropolitan area Location within Illinois Location within the United States
- Location: 5510 N. Sheridan Rd., Chicago, Illinois
- Coordinates: 41°58′57″N 87°39′20″W
- Area: less than one acre
- Built: 1927; 99 years ago
- Architect: Quinn & Christiansen
- Architectural style: French Renaissance Revival
- NRHP reference No.: 01000870
- Added to NRHP: August 8, 2001

The Building at 5510 North Sheridan is a historic apartment building at 5510 N. Sheridan Road in the Edgewater neighborhood of Chicago, Illinois. Built in 1927, the seventeen-story building was originally marketed as luxury apartment housing with views of Lake Michigan. Luxury apartments became popular in the 1920s in Chicago, especially on lakefront plots where developers sought to maximize the land's value; to convince affluent Chicagoans to live in a smaller space, new apartments were frequently compared to Parisian apartments, which had become a status symbol in France in the nineteenth century. Architects Quinn & Christiansen designed the French Renaissance Revival building; the French-inspired architecture was used to market the apartments as Parisian. The building's design features a brick exterior with decorative limestone, quoins around the front entrances, and a cornice below a recessed mansard roof.

The building was added to the National Register of Historic Places on August 8, 2001.
