= Rogers Park Manor Bungalow Historic District =

- U.S. National Register of Historic Places
- U.S. Historic district
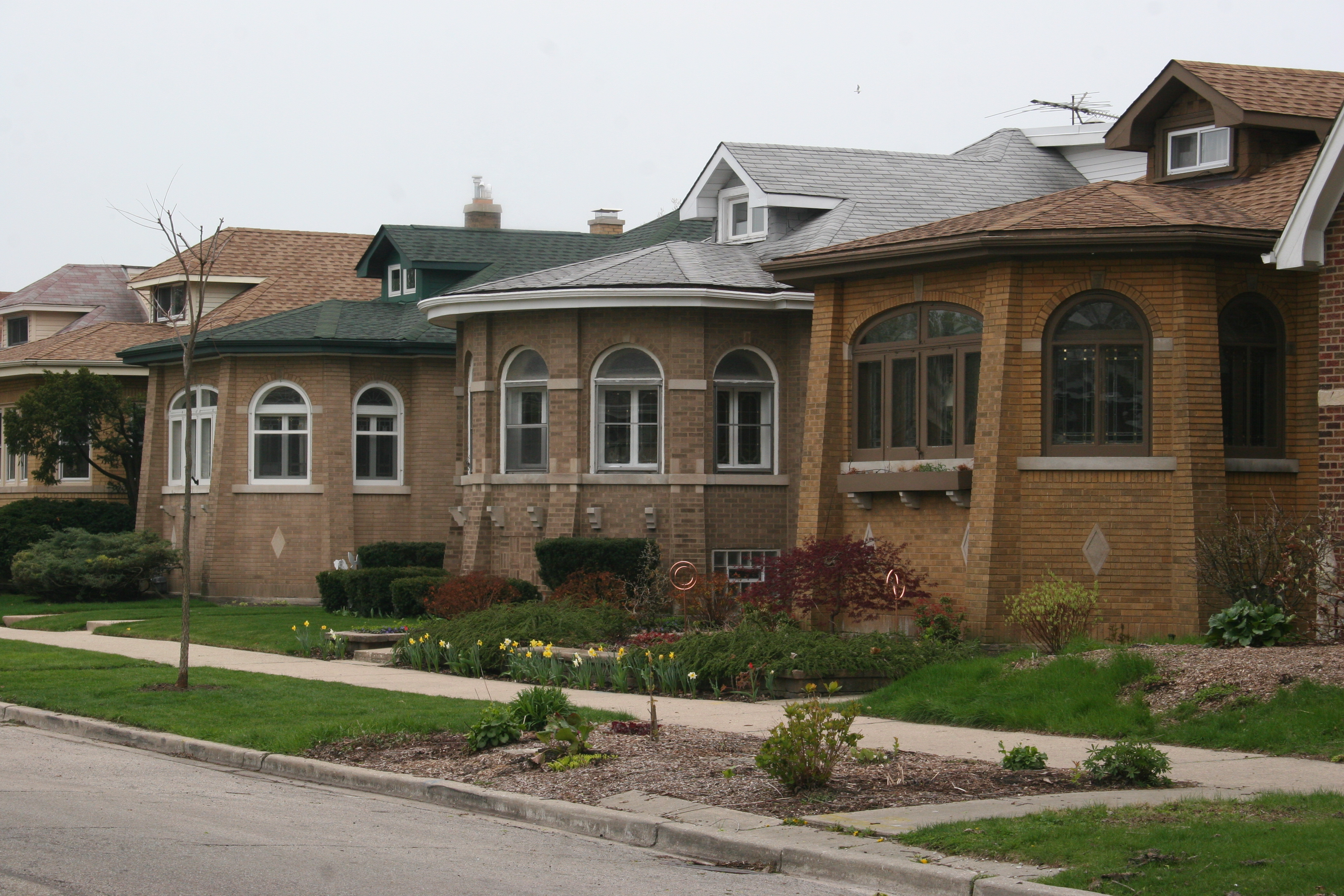

- Location within Chicago metropolitan area Location within Illinois Location within the United States
- Location: Roughly bounded by W. Lunt Ave., N. Western Ave., both sides of W. Farwell Ave. and N. California Ave., Chicago, Illinois
- Coordinates: 42°00′24″N 87°41′42″W
- Area: 140 acres (57 ha)
- Architectural style: Chicago bungalow
- MPS: Chicago Bungalows MPS
- NRHP reference No.: 05001258
- Added to NRHP: November 15, 2005

The Rogers Park Manor Bungalow Historic District is a residential historic district in the West Ridge neighborhood of Chicago, Illinois. The district includes 329 buildings, 247 of which are Chicago bungalows built in the 1920s. As homeownership became more accessible to working-class Chicagoans in the early twentieth century, bungalows became an affordable and popular style due to their easily replicable design, and tens of thousands of the houses were built throughout Chicago. The Rogers Park Manor area was typical of new bungalow neighborhoods, as it was an underdeveloped outlying neighborhood near the city's northern edge. The bungalows in Rogers Park Manor were built by several different developers and architects, which led to variation in the size and shape of the homes despite their similar designs.

The district was added to the National Register of Historic Places on November 15, 2005.
