= Sheffield Historic District =

- U.S. National Register of Historic Places
- U.S. Historic district
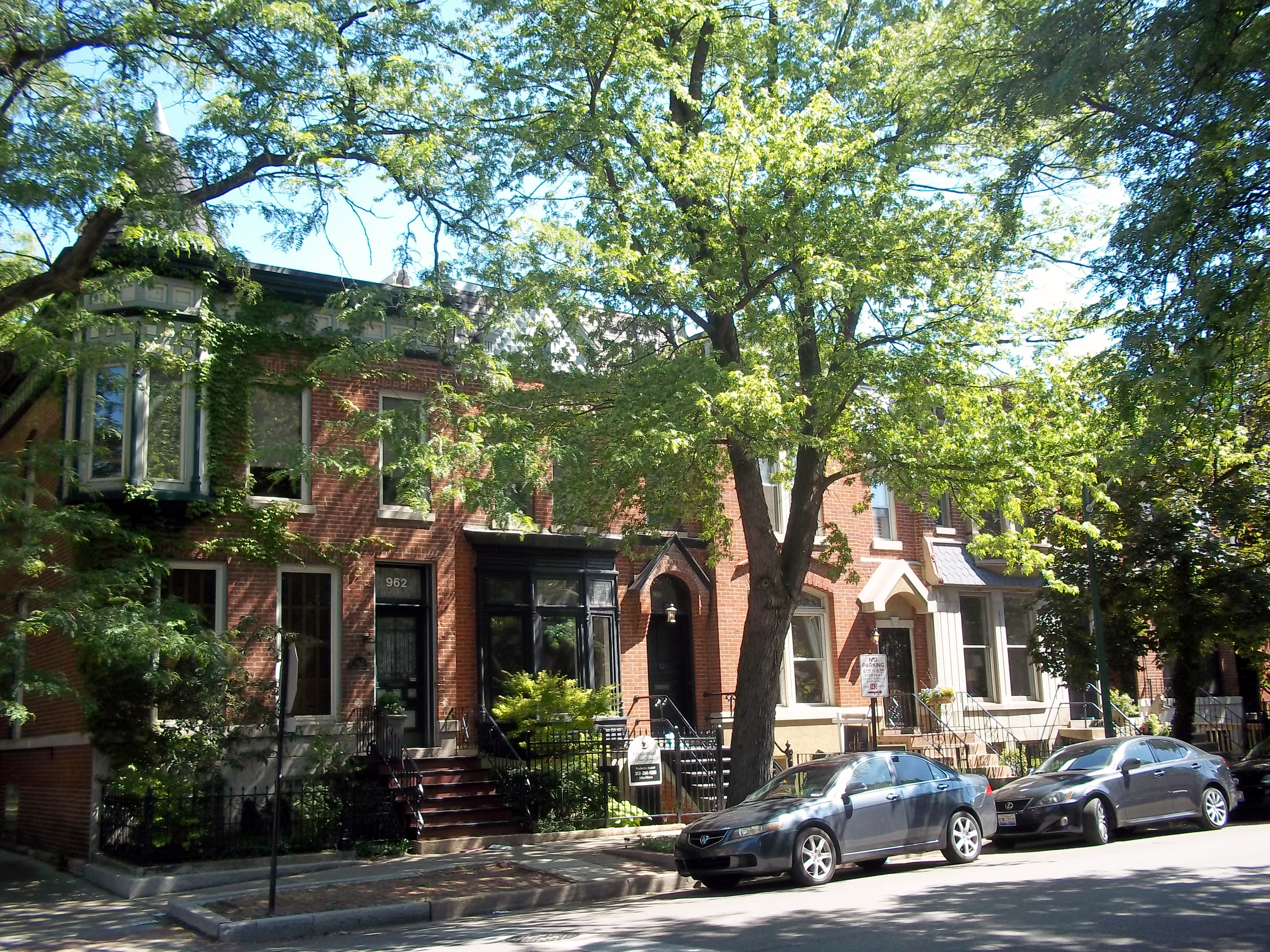

- Location within Chicago metropolitan area Location within Illinois Location within the United States
- Location: Bounded roughly by W. Fullerton Avenue, N. Lincoln Avenue, N. Larrabee Street, W. Dickens Avenue, N. Burling Street, W. Wisconsin Street, N. Clybourn Avenue, N. Lakewood Avenue, W. Belden Avenue, and N. Southport Avenue; also W. Montana Street, W. Altgeld Street and Southport Avenue; also roughly bounded by W. Altgeld Street and N. Lakewood Avenue, W. Fullerton Avenue, N. Southport Avenue; also roughly bounded by W. Wisconsin Street, W. Armitage Avenue, N. Howe Street, N. Halsted Street, N. Willow Street, and N. Kenmore Avenue, Chicago, Illinois
- Coordinates: 41°55′15″N 87°39′12″W
- Area: 530 acres (210 ha)
- NRHP reference No.: 76000704
- Added to NRHP: January 11, 1976

The Sheffield Historic District is a national historic district in the Lincoln Park neighborhood of Chicago, Illinois. The district is primarily a residential area, though it also includes multiple small commercial areas. The area takes its name from Joseph Sheffield, who established an area for farmers to bring livestock and produce to prepare for shipping on Chicago, Rock Island railroad founded by Joseph Sheffield a New Haven, Connecticut resident at the site in the late 1840s. Residential development in the area began in 1868, as European immigrants created a demand for new housing, and continued through the 1900s. The district includes examples of many of the most popular architectural styles of the late nineteenth century, with the Queen Anne and Romanesque Revival styles being especially well-represented.

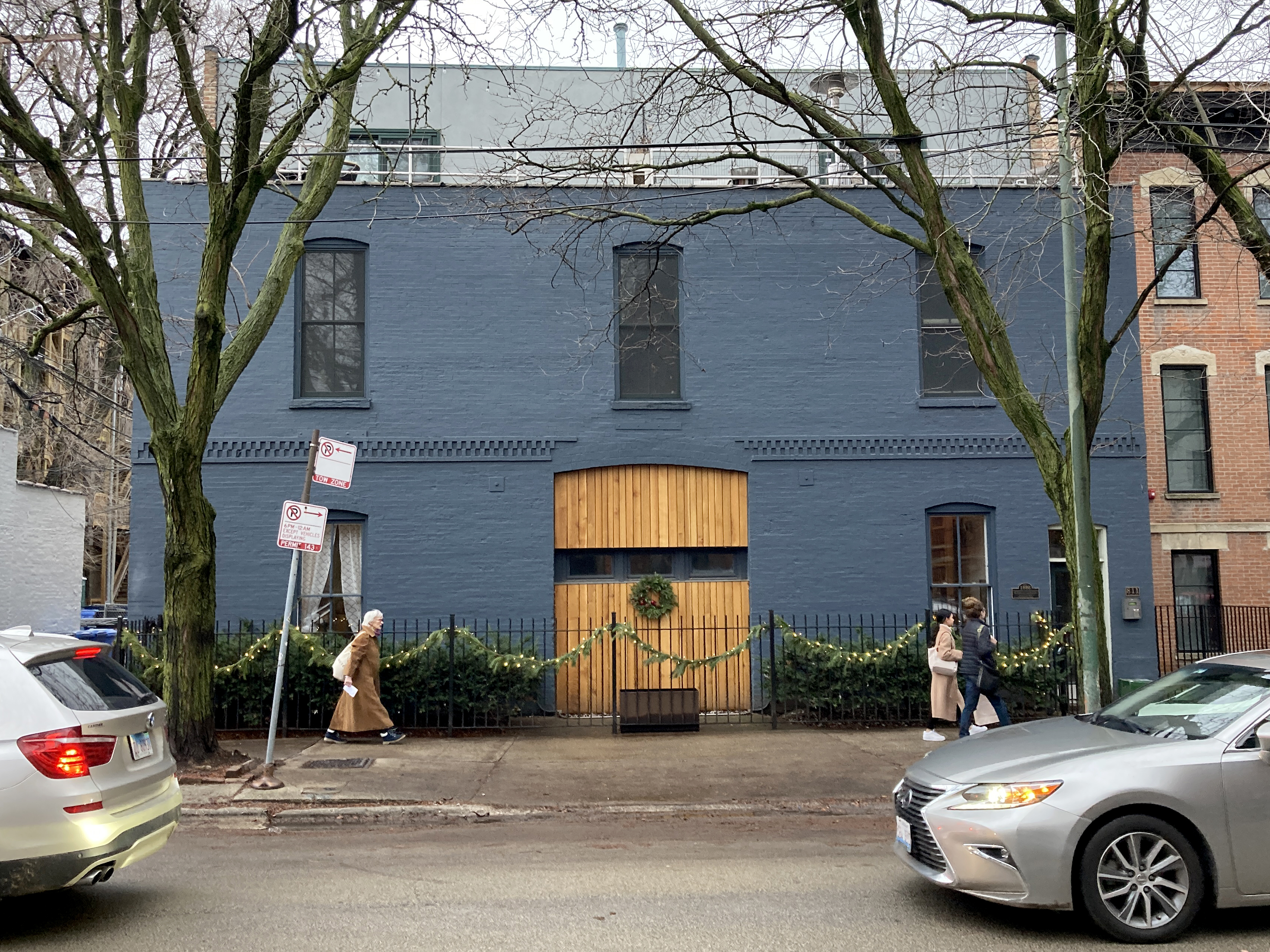
Historic building in the district, former home of the Page Boiler Company (1930s-90s)

The district was added to the National Register of Historic Places on January 11, 1976. Its boundaries were expanded three times in the 1980s (Reference Number 76000704).
