= Anderson–Carlson Building =

Apartment building in Chicago, Illinois

- U.S. National Register of Historic Places
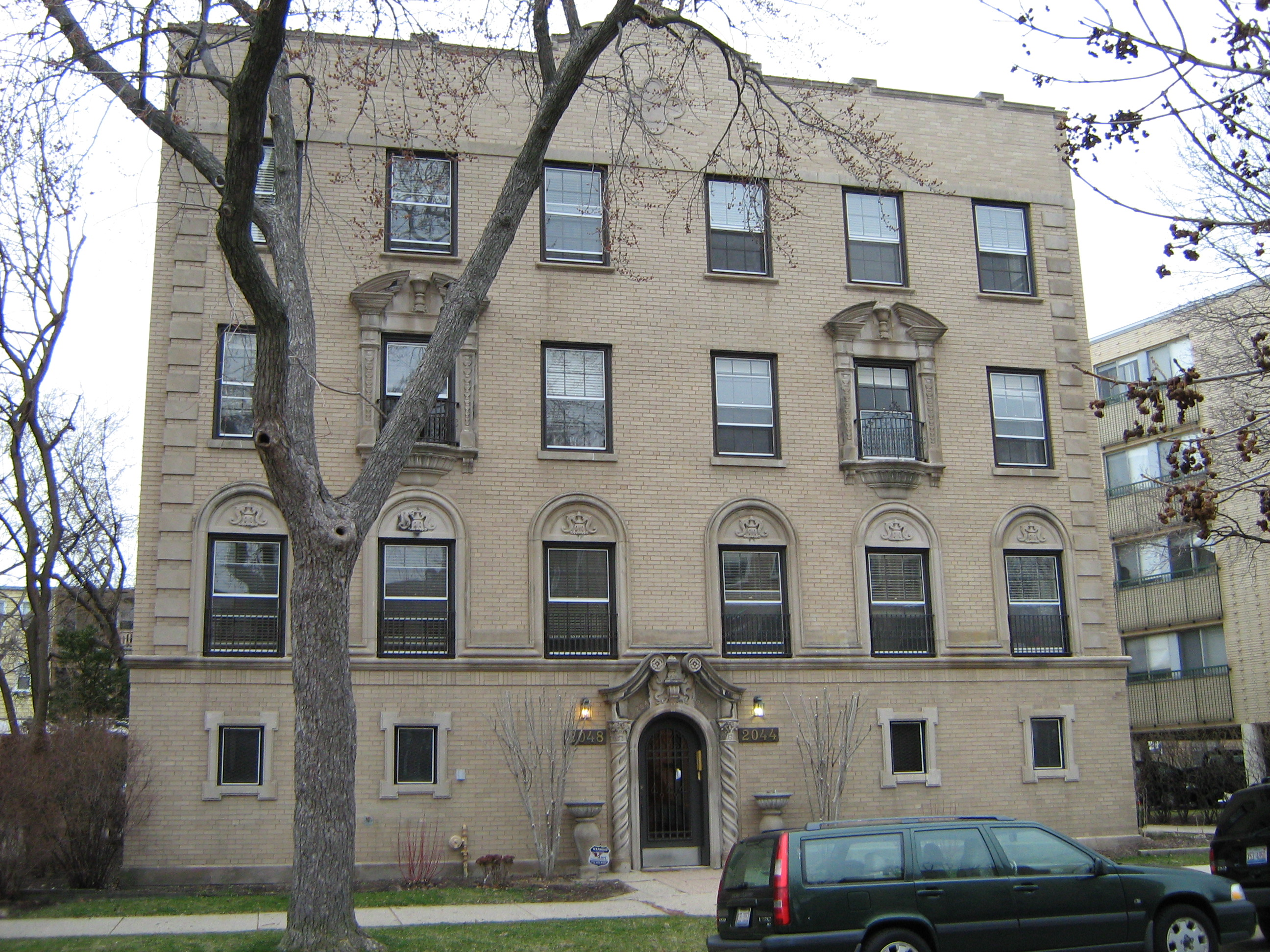

- Location within Chicago metropolitan area Location within Illinois Location within the United States
- Location: 2044–48 W. Farwell Ave., Chicago, Illinois
- Coordinates: 42°0′31″N 87°40′58″W
- Area: less than one acre
- Built: 1928
- Architect: Godfrey E. Larson, Edward Edlund
- Architectural style: Spanish Baroque
- NRHP reference No.: 05001259
- Added to NRHP: November 15, 2005

The Anderson–Carlson Building is a historic six-flat apartment building in the West Ridge community area of Chicago, Illinois. George E. Carlson and F. Anderson commissioned the building, which was completed in 1928 and owned by Anderson's family for the first 27 years of its existence. The building was designed by Godfrey E. Larson, a Chicago architect who later worked as a field representative for the Public Works Administration. The apartment was built in the Spanish Baroque Revival style, which can be seen in the pilasters and swan's-neck pediment in its entryway and the two windows designed to resemble balconies. While many six-flat apartments were constructed in West Ridge and neighboring Rogers Park in the 1920s, the Anderson–Carlson Building is the only one designed in the Spanish Baroque Revival style and one of the few with a highly detailed design. The building has been largely unaltered since its construction; with the exception of one window, every major feature of the building is still present, and five of its six apartments have maintained their original design. On November 15, 2003, the building was added to the National Register of Historic Places.
