= Portage Park Bungalow Historic District =

- Talman West Ridge Bungalow Historic District
- U.S. National Register of Historic Places
- U.S. Historic district
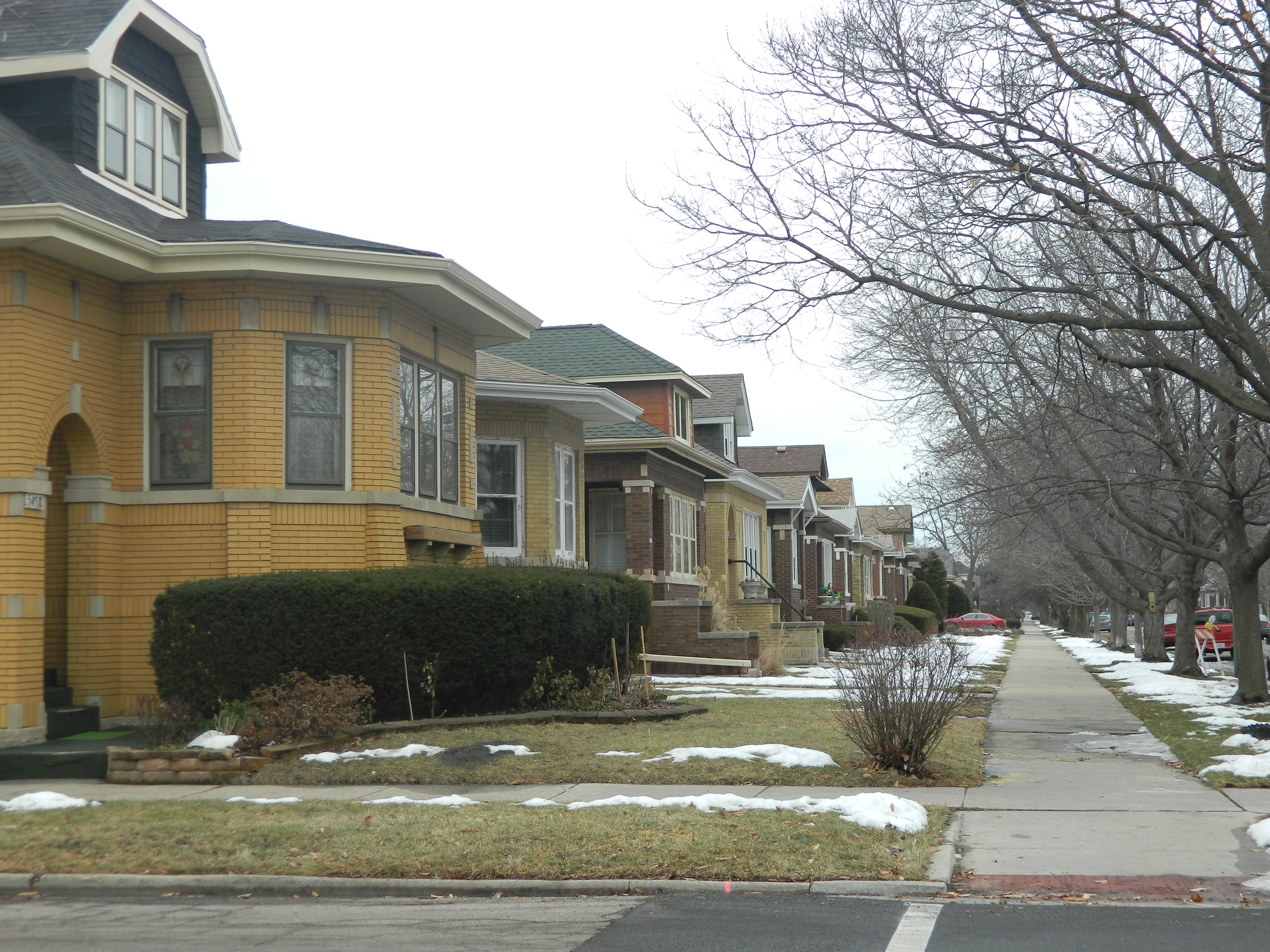

- Location within Chicago metropolitan area Location within Illinois Location within the United States
- Location: Roughly bounded by W. Pensacola Street, N. Lockwood Avenue & N. Central Avenue and W. Hutchinson Street, Chicago, Illinois
- Coordinates: 41°57′31″N 87°45′49″W
- Area: 36.1 acres (14.6 ha)
- Architectural style: Chicago bungalow
- MPS: Chicago Bungalows MPS
- NRHP reference No.: 14000620
- Added to NRHP: September 17, 2014

The Portage Park Bungalow Historic District is a residential historic district in the Portage Park neighborhood of Chicago, Illinois. The district includes 225 buildings, 189 of which are brick Chicago bungalows built between 1915 and 1930. As homeownership became broadly accessible to Chicagoans in the early twentieth century, the bungalow emerged as a popular and affordable house design, and tens of thousands of the homes were built throughout Chicago. Portage Park was one of the many outlying neighborhoods of Chicago which grew dramatically as a result of the housing boom; new residents were also attracted to the neighborhood's eponymous park. While the district was developed by many different builders and architects, the use of a single home type with uniform setbacks from the street gives the neighborhood a consistent appearance.

The district was added to the National Register of Historic Places on September 17, 2014.
