= Theodore Rozek House =

Historic house in Illinois, United States

- U.S. National Register of Historic Places
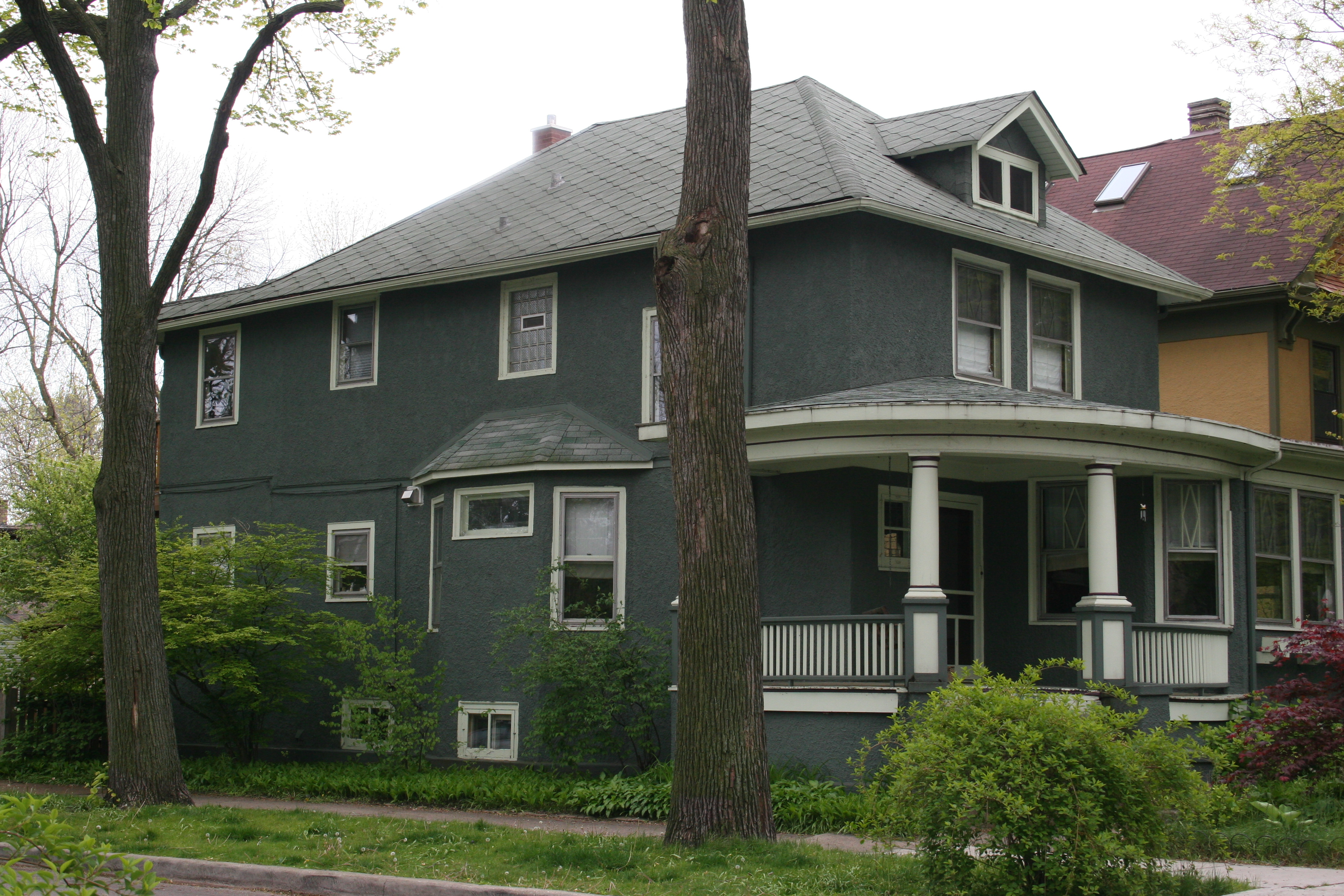

- Location within Chicago metropolitan area Location within Illinois Location within the United States
- Location: 6337 N. Hermitage Ave., Chicago, Illinois
- Coordinates: 41°59′54″N 87°40′23″W
- Area: less than one acre
- Built: 1908, c. 1925
- Architect: Clarence Hatzfeld; Andrew E. Norman
- Architectural style: American Foursquare
- NRHP reference No.: 11000779
- Added to NRHP: November 2, 2011

The Theodore Rozek House is a historic house at 6337 N. Hermitage Avenue in the Edgewater neighborhood of Chicago, Illinois. The house was built in 1908 for Theodore Rozek, a printer and German immigrant, and his family. Architect Clarence Hatzfeld designed the original house in the American Foursquare style, a popular vernacular style of the early twentieth century. Like many other Foursquare homes, the house had a square shape and was topped by a hip roof with a dormer. In the mid-1920s, architect Andrew E. Norman designed an addition for the front of the house; this addition was inspired by the Better Homes movement, which sought to bring high-level architecture to working-class homes. The addition replaced the original front porch with a semi-circular porch supported by its original columns, distinguishing the house from its neighbors.

The house was added to the National Register of Historic Places on November 2, 2011.
