= Talman West Ridge Bungalow Historic District =

- U.S. National Register of Historic Places
- U.S. Historic district
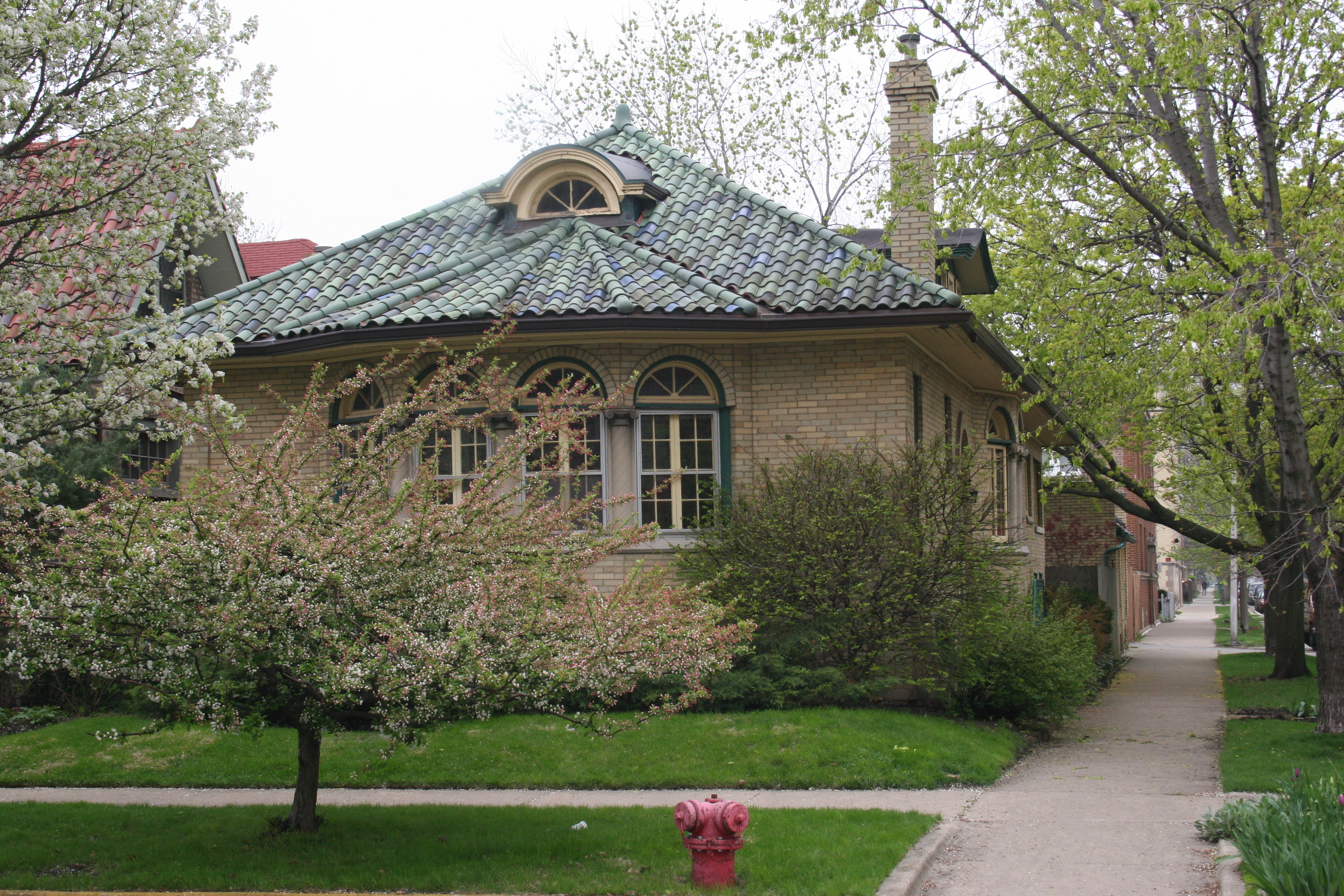

- Location within Chicago metropolitan area Location within Illinois Location within the United States
- Location: bounded roughly by N. Campbell Ave., W. Devon Ave., N. Fairfield Ave., and W. Pratt Ave., Chicago, Illinois
- Coordinates: 41°59′52″N 87°41′32″W
- Area: 31 acres (13 ha)
- Architectural style: Chicago bungalow
- MPS: Chicago Bungalows MPS
- NRHP reference No.: 08001169
- Added to NRHP: December 10, 2008

The Talman West Ridge Bungalow Historic District is a residential historic district in the West Ridge neighborhood of Chicago, Illinois. 181 of the district's 272 buildings are either brick Chicago bungalows or older stucco bungalows built from 1919 to 1930. As homeownership became more affordable in early twentieth century Chicago, the bungalow became popular for its easily and cheaply replicated design, and tens of thousands of the homes were built throughout the city. West Ridge, a lightly developed area on Chicago's northern border, was typical of the neighborhoods that were dominated by new bungalows. While a variety of developers and architects built the district's bungalows in distinctive fashions, the homes' similar designs and consistent setbacks from the street give the district a cohesive appearance.

The district was added to the National Register of Historic Places on December 10, 2008.
