= George C. Hield =

American real estate businessman

- Born: November 15, 1852; Janesville, Wisconsin, U.S.
- Died: May 21, 1957 (aged 104); Phoenix, Arizona, U.S.
- Occupation: Real estate developer
- Parents: George Hield (father); Mary H. Rhodes (mother)

George C. Hield (November 15, 1852 - May 21, 1957) was a real estate businessman from Wisconsin. He was a prominent player of real estate in Chicago. Previously, he was a hay dealer.

George C. Hield moved to Chicago in the 1890s. Hield developed most of the Falconer District after purchasing the land subdivided by the Falconer family between 1913 and 1919. From 1915 to 1921, most of the buildings in the area were developed by Hield.
