= Mandel Brothers Warehouse Building =

- U.S. National Register of Historic Places
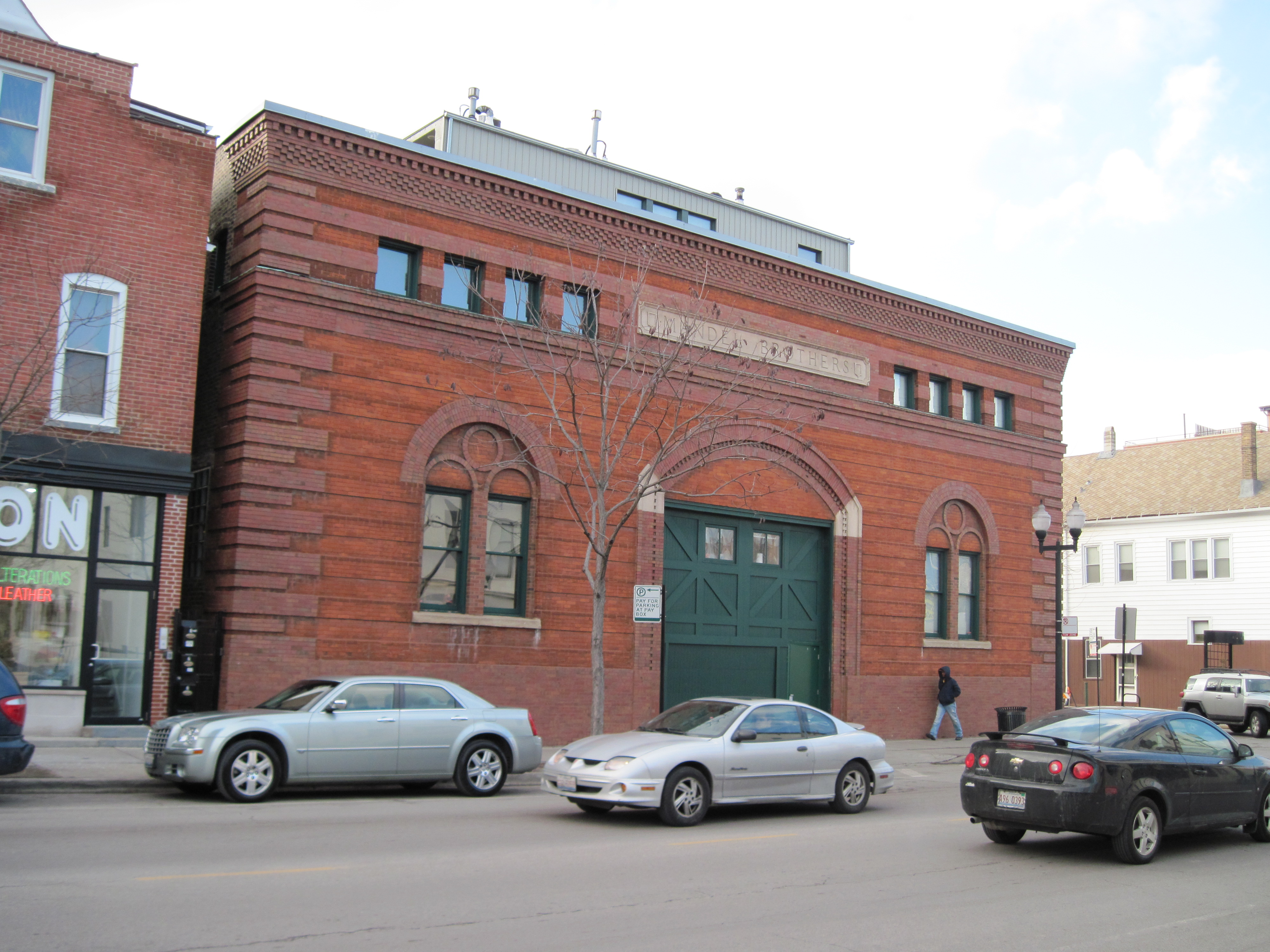

- Location within Chicago metropolitan area Location within Illinois Location within the United States
- Location: 3254 N. Halsted St., Chicago, Illinois
- Coordinates: 41°56′30″N 87°38′58″W
- Area: 1 acre (0.40 ha)
- Built: 1903
- Architect: Holabird & Roche
- Architectural style: Renaissance Revival
- NRHP reference No.: 93000841
- Added to NRHP: August 19, 1993

The Mandel Brothers Warehouse Building is a historic warehouse at 3254 N. Halsted Street in the Lakeview neighborhood of Chicago, Illinois. The Mandel Brothers Department Store, one of the oldest department store companies in Chicago at the time, built the warehouse in 1903 to support its delivery service. Prominent Chicago architecture firm Holabird & Roche, who also designed both stores and warehouses for many of Chicago's other department store companies, designed the warehouse. The firm used a Renaissance Revival design for the warehouse, an uncommon choice that stood out from Chicago's many utilitarian warehouses. Their design features a brick exterior with quoins, an arched entrance and windows, and a parapet with decorative brickwork.

The building was added to the National Register of Historic Places on August 19, 1993.
