= Uptown Square Historic District =

- U.S. National Register of Historic Places
- U.S. Historic district
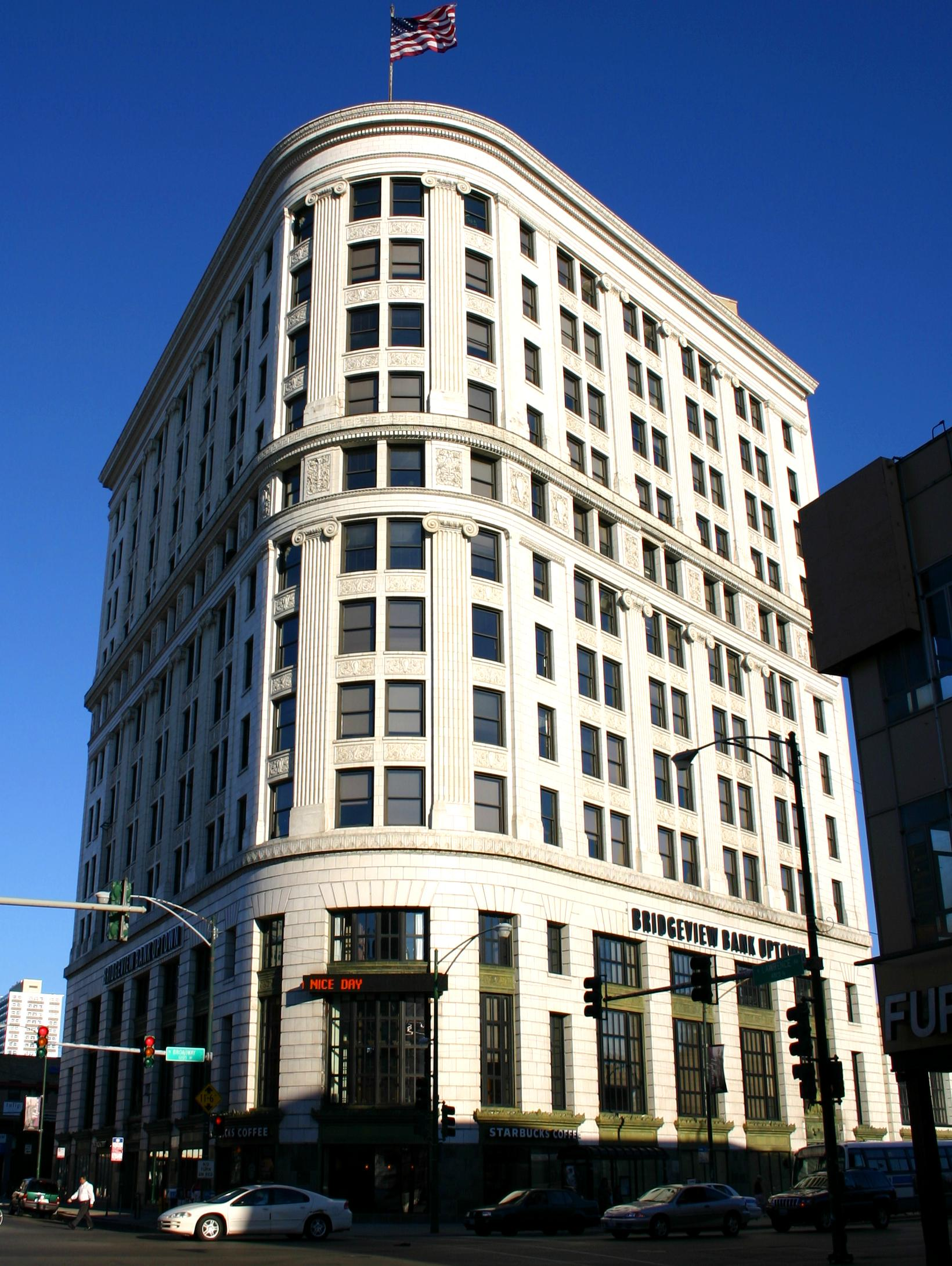

- Location within Chicago metropolitan area Location within Illinois Location within the United States
- Location: Roughly along Lawrence Ave., and Broadway, Chicago, Illinois
- Coordinates: 41°58′05″N 87°39′26″W
- Area: 38 acres (15 ha)
- NRHP reference No.: 00001336
- Added to NRHP: November 8, 2000

The Uptown Square Historic District is a commercial historic district encompassing parts of Broadway and Lawrence Avenue in the Uptown neighborhood of Chicago, Illinois. Primarily developed between 1900 and 1930, the district was Chicago's largest commercial and entertainment hub away from downtown in the early twentieth century. The opening of Wilson station on the Northwestern Elevated Railroad spurred the area's development, as the transit line made Uptown's beaches an accessible tourist destination for the rest of the city. Many stores, restaurants, theaters, and clubs sprang up to cater to the area's new tourists, and it soon became a destination for young, single Chicagoans seeking entertainment. The district includes several prominent entertainment venues, including the Balaban and Katz-run Uptown Theatre and Riviera Theatre, the Aragon Ballroom, and the Green Mill nightclub; it also includes the Uptown Broadway Building.

The district was added to the National Register of Historic Places on November 8, 2000.
