= Lawrence Avenue =

Lawrence Avenue may refer to:

- Lawrence Avenue (Chicago), Illinois, United States
- Lawrence Avenue (Toronto), Ontario, Canada
- Lawrence Avenue Historic District, Boston, Massachusetts, United States
