= Sheridan Trust and Savings Bank Building =

12-story building in Uptown, Chicago, US

Coordinates: 41°58′7.5″N 87°39′32.9″W

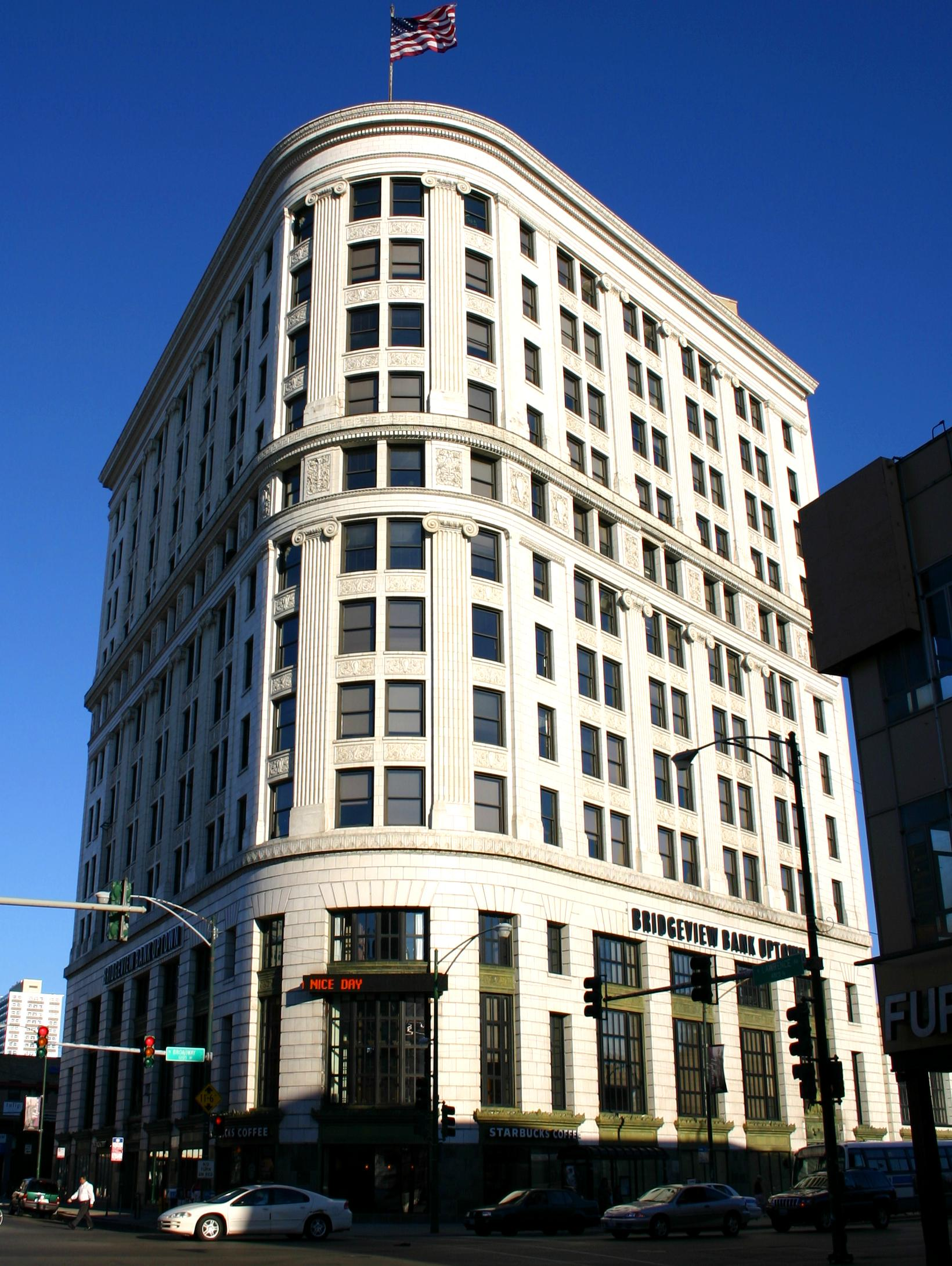
Sheridan Trust and Savings Bank Building, now owned by Cedar St.

The Sheridan Trust and Savings Bank Building, currently known as the Teller House, is a 12-story terra cotta building at 4753 North Broadway in Uptown, Chicago. The first eight floors of the structure were built in 1924 by Marshall and Fox. Huszagh and Hill added a four-story addition in 1928. The City of Chicago granted the structure Chicago Landmark status on October 8, 2008.

The building's original tenant, the Sheridan Trust and Savings Bank, failed in 1931. Uptown National Bank began using the building in 1937. The bank and the building were acquired by Bridgeview Bank in 2003.

In 2019, the building was bought by the real estate developer Cedar St., with plans to convert most of the building into residential units. The building reopened in 2023 as a mixed-use apartment and office complex branded The Teller House. Tenants include WeWork and Old National Bank.

Historically, Teller House was home to a number of non-profit organizations and social service agencies serving low-income, immigrant, and refugee communities in the Uptown area.

== In popular culture ==
In an episode of the television series M*A*S*H in March 1977 ("Post-Op", season 5, episode 24), a patient from Chicago tells Col. Sherman T. Potter that this bank exists at the southeast corner of Broadway and Lawrence after Potter mistakenly believes a tavern stood on the site.

The interior of the building was used in the 2009 film Public Enemies.
