= Uptown Broadway Building =

- U.S. National Register of Historic Places
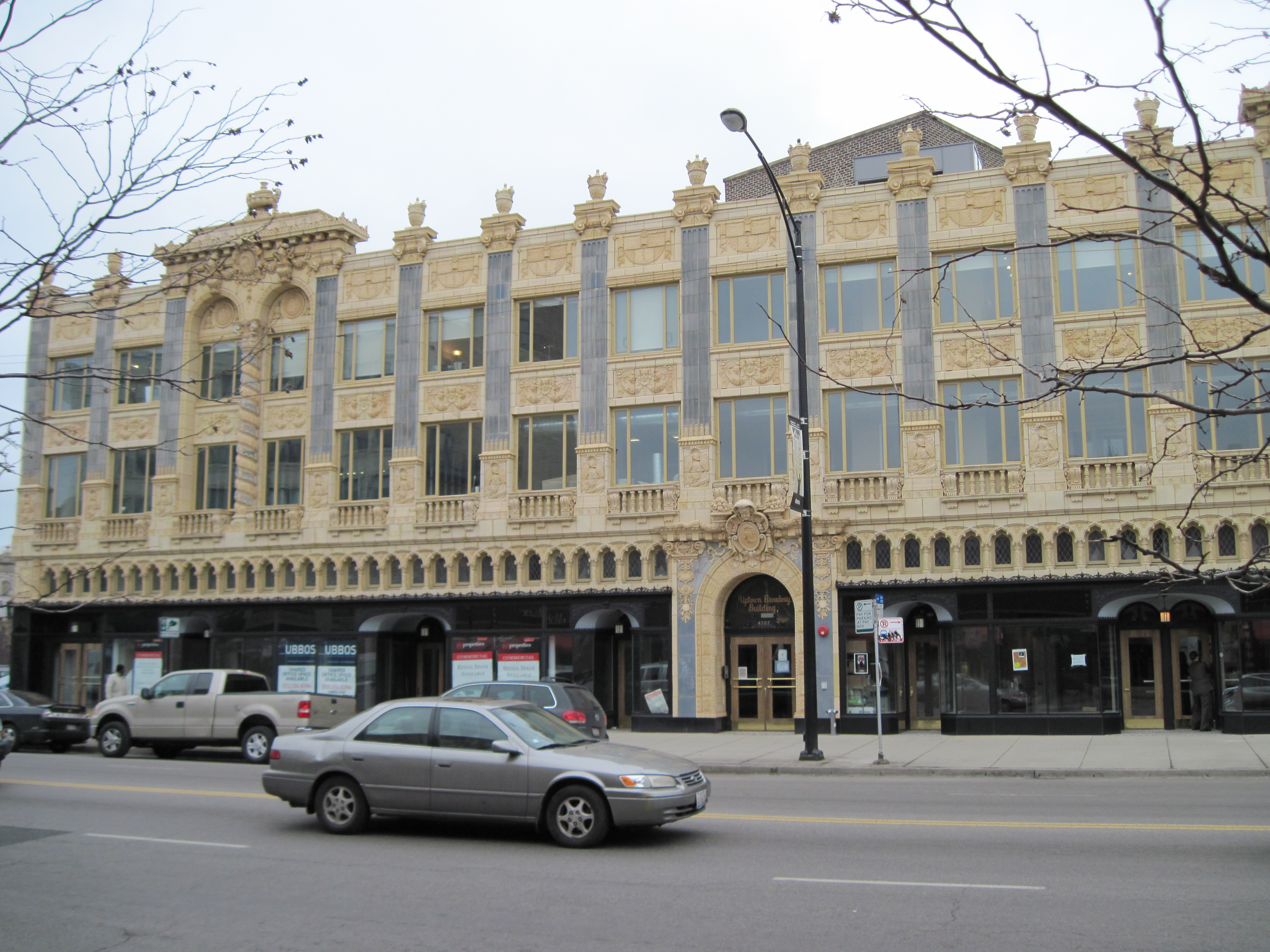

- Location within Chicago metropolitan area Location within Illinois Location within the United States
- Location: 4703-4715 N. Broadway, Chicago, Illinois
- Coordinates: 41°58′5″N 87°39′31″W
- Area: less than one acre
- Built: 1926
- Architect: Walter W. Ahlschlager
- NRHP reference No.: 86003143
- Added to NRHP: November 06, 1986

The Uptown Broadway Building is a historic three-story building at 4703–4715 North Broadway in Uptown, Chicago. Built in 1926, it was designed by Walter W. Ahlschlager and is known for its ornate terra-cotta facade depicting ancient gods, rams' heads, shields, helmets, birds, fruits, and trophies. Lynn Becker of the Chicago Reader has called the exterior "a riotous, Spanish-baroque-inspired hallucination". According to unconfirmed local legends, Al Capone operated a speakeasy in the building's basement.

The building was listed on the National Register of Historic Places in 1986. It is also listed as part of the Uptown Square Historic District.

The Kiss Kiss Cabaret performed in the building from 2013 to 2018. Since 2019, it has been home to the Baton Show Lounge.

In 2025, HV Entertainment bought the bar and announced plans to reopen the Chicago Eagle, a former gay bar catering to the leather LGBT community, previously located at 5015 N Clark St in Andersonville. HV Entertainment pledged to provide a dedicated space for the Baton Show Lounge within the bar. The Chicago Eagle officially reopened Memorial Day weekend, 2026.

== See also ==
- National Register of Historic Places listings in North Side Chicago
