= Kiss Kiss Cabaret =

- Genre: Cabaret show
- Date: Friday nights
- Frequency: Weekly
- Locations: Uptown Broadway Building in Chicago, IL
- Inaugurated: 2009
- Founder: Jenn A. Kincaid and Chris O. Biddle

The Kiss Kiss Cabaret was a live weekly variety show presenting vaudeville and neo-burlesque on Friday nights at the Uptown Broadway Building in Chicago, IL.

== The Kiss Kiss Cabaret ==
The Kiss Kiss Cabaret started as a Halloween burlesque called "Peek-A-Boo" in 2009 at The Greenhouse Theater Center. Created by Jenn A. Kincaid and Chris O. Biddle, the show presents classic striptease, with various local acts including magicians, jugglers, belly dancers, acrobatics, and comedians. It is hosted by one of the Flattery siblings. They start by reading the announcements, acknowledging the VIPs, and explaining the etiquette of burlesque. Verner and Velma Von Claptrap are The Claptrap Family Orchestra, who play dirty songs and add rimshots with a children's drum set.

The Kiss Kiss Cabaret showcases traditional "evening wear" and "balloon dance" type shows where the performer begins elaborately clothed or covered and ends in a thong and pasties or tassels. The show adopts a theme every year like movies, or mobsters, as well as Halloween. and Christmas In 2013, it was voted "Best Burlesque Troupe" by the Chicago Reader.

According to their Instagram account, Kiss Kiss Cabaret performed their last show on December 29, 2018, at The Den Theater in Chicago, IL.

== Uptown Underground ==
As of the spring of 2015, the Kiss Kiss Cabaret moved to their new location, called The Uptown Underground at Uptown Broadway Building in Uptown, Chicago, across the street from The Green Mill Cocktail Lounge and The Riviera Theatre.

The Uptown Underground closed in September 2018 after a dispute with the landlord over $100,000 of unpaid rent.

== See also ==
- Neo-burlesque
- Burlesque Hall of Fame
