= Uplift Community High School =

Location
- 900 W Wilson Ave; Chicago, Illinois 60640; United States; 41.9659°N 87.6522°W

Information
- School type: Public secondary
- Established: 2005
- School district: Chicago Public Schools
- CEEB code: 141091
- Principal: Dr. Tyrese L. Graham
- Grades: 9–12
- Gender: Coed
- Enrollment: 120 (2023–24)
- Campus type: Urban
- Colors: Maroon; Gold
- Athletics conference: Chicago Public League
- Team name: Titans
- Accreditation: North Central Association of Colleges and Schools
- Website: uplifths.cps.edu

Uplift Community High School (commonly known as simply Uplift) is a public four-year high school located in the Uptown neighborhood on the north side of Chicago, Illinois, United States. Established in 2005, Uplift is a part of the Chicago Public Schools system. As of the 2019–2020 school year, the school has 121 students.

== Athletics ==
Uplift competes in the Chicago Public League (CPL) and is a member of the Illinois High School Association (IHSA). Uplift sports teams are nicknamed the Titans. The boys' basketball team were regional champions two times, (2008–09, 2010–11); and won the IHSA 2–A state title in 2014–15 behind the schools stars Jeremey Roscoe and Daniel Soetan and a Northside Prep transfer Spencer Foley while Junior Varsity sensation Demarius Jacobs enjoyed some playing time as well
