= Uptown, Chicago =

Community area in Chicago, Illinois

Uptown
- Community area
- Community Area 03 - Uptown
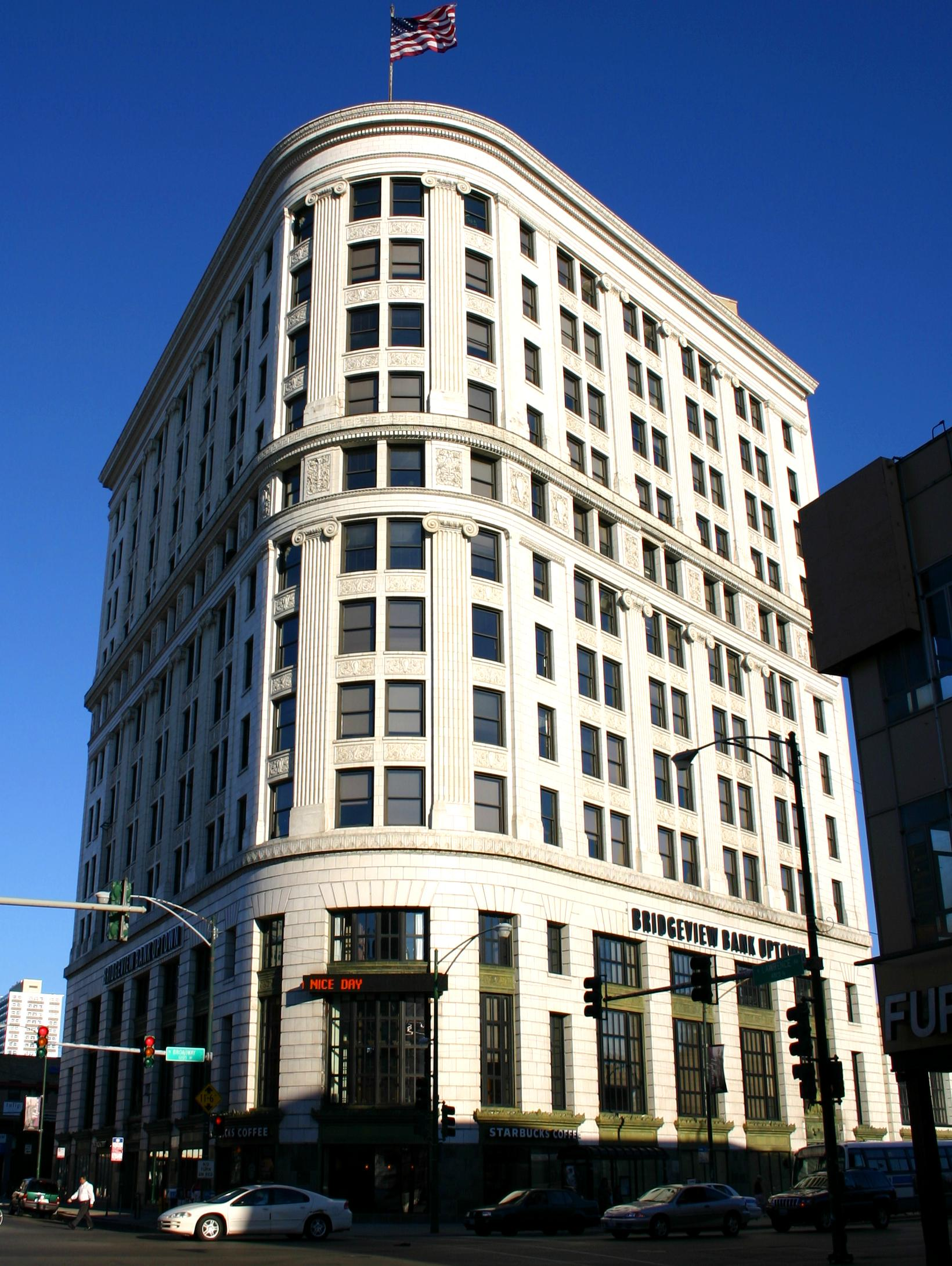
- The Sheridan Trust and Savings Bank Building, on the corner of Broadway and Lawrence since 1924, has Chicago Landmark status.

- Location within the city of Chicago
- Coordinates: 41°58.2′N 87°39.6′W
- Country: United States
- State: Illinois
- County: Cook
- City: Chicago

Area
  - Total: 2.33 sq mi (6.03 km^{2})

Population (2024)
  - Total: 56,344
  - Density: 24,200/sq mi (9,340/km^{2})

Demographics (2024)
  - White: 52.0%
  - Black: 19.0%
  - Hispanic: 14.1%
  - Asian: 10.3%
  - Other: 4.5%

Educational Attainment (2024)
  - High School Diploma or Higher: 92.7%
  - Bachelor's Degree or Higher: 60.8%
- Time zone: UTC-6 (CST)
  - Summer (DST): UTC-5 (CDT)
- ZIP Codes: parts of 60613, 60640
- Median household income (2026): $77,428
- Source: U.S. Census, Record Information Services

Uptown is one of the 77 community areas of Chicago in Illinois, United States. It is bounded by Foster Avenue to the north; Montrose Avenue and Irving Park Road to the south; Lake Michigan to the east; and Ravenswood Avenue and Clark Street to the west.

Uptown rose to prominence in the early twentieth century as Chicagoland's largest commercial and entertainment center outside of the Loop thanks to its plentiful theaters, clubs, shops and parkland. It was also a center for early film-making. To this day Uptown remains a hub for live entertainment, particularly Uptown Square.

Uptown's amenities include Montrose Beach and multiple nature reserves. It is also home to Truman College and the historic Graceland Cemetery.

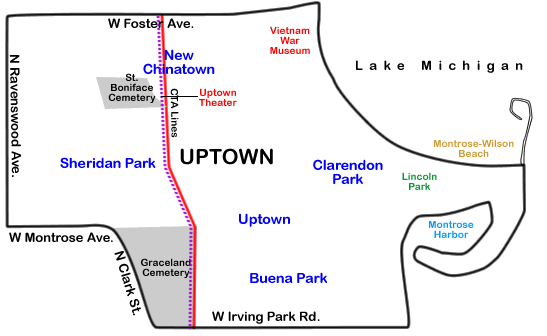
Map of Uptown neighborhood.

== History ==
=== Early years ===
The historical, cultural, and commercial center of Uptown is Broadway, with Uptown Square at the center. In 1900, the Northwestern Elevated Railroad constructed its terminal at Wilson and Broadway (now part of the CTA Red Line). Uptown became a summer resort town for downtown dwellers, and derived its name from the Uptown Store, which was the commercial center for the community. For a time, all northbound elevated trains from downtown terminated in Uptown. Uptown became known as an entertainment destination. Charlie Chaplin, Gloria Swanson and other early film stars produced films at the Essanay Studios on Argyle Street. The Aragon Ballroom, Riviera Theater, Uptown Theatre, and Green Mill Jazz Club are all located within a half block of Lawrence and Broadway. Uptown is also home to one of Chicago's most celebrated final resting spots, Graceland Cemetery.

The Uptown neighborhood boundary once extended farther to the North, to Hollywood Avenue. Beginning at the turn of the 20th century, just after the World's Columbian Exposition, the entire area had experienced a housing construction boom. In the mid-1920s, construction of large and luxurious entertainment venues resulted in many of the ornate and historic Uptown Square buildings which exist today. The craftsmanship and artistry of those Uptown Square buildings reflects the ornate pavilions of the Exposition.

For over a century, Uptown has been a popular Chicago entertainment district, playing a significant role in ushering in the Gilded Age, the American Lyceum movement, the Jazz Age, the silent film era, the swing era, the big band era, and the rock and roll era. It has also been a filming location for over 480 movies. Uptown has ties to significant spectator sport athletes and organizations, including the Chicago Blackhawks and three Olympic figure skaters, as well as theater, comedy clubs, dance performers who later became nationally famous, and even "The People's Music School," a needs-based, tuition-free music school for formal classical music training.

=== Postwar era ===
By the 1950s, the middle class was leaving Uptown for more distant suburbs, as commuter rail and elevated train lines were extended. Uptown's housing stock was aging, and old mansions were subdivided. Residential hotels which had housed wives of sailors attached to the Great Lakes Naval Station during World War II now served low-income migrants from the South and Appalachia. Uptown developed a reputation as "Hillbilly Heaven" in the 1950s and the 1960s. The Council of the Southern Mountains, headquartered in Berea, Kentucky, launched the Chicago Southern Center in 1963 in Uptown, with help from the Chicago philanthropist W. Clement Stone. Chicago's anti-poverty program opened the Montrose Urban Progress Center. Students for a Democratic Society initiated a community organizing project, JOIN (Jobs or Income Now) in 1963. Large-scale urban renewal projects like Harry S. Truman College eliminated much low-cost housing, and the low-income Southern white residents dispersed. New waves of Asian, Hispanic, and African-American migrants moved into the remaining neighborhoods.

Beginning in the 1950s, Native Americans came to Chicago in increasing numbers as part of a relocation program initiated by the federal government, although those sponsored by the Bureau of Indian Affairs may have constituted a minority of arrivals, who often came to the city independently in search of economic opportunities. With supportive neighborhood institutions such as the American Indian Center, availability of social services, and low housing costs, Uptown established itself as the central hub for the growing community. Indeed, the Native population in Chicago nearly doubled from 3,400 in the 1960 Census to at least 6,500 by the end of the decade, with growth continuing even after the lapse of the federal relocation program. The majority of Uptown's Native American residents dispersed following the decline in factory jobs throughout the 1980s, with some moving to neighborhoods west of Uptown while others returned to their reservations altogether.

Latinos forced out from other near downtown and lakefront areas by urban renewal settled close to the border with Lakeview at Sheridan, near Irving Park Rd. In 1975 Young Lords founder Jose (Cha-Cha) Jimenez joined with a broad coalition of whites, blacks and Latinos and ran unsuccessfully against Daley-sponsored Christopher Cohen but still garnered 39% of the vote. His main campaign issue was housing corruption, which was displacing Latinos and the poor from prime real estate areas of Chicago.

Historical population
Census	Pop.	Note	%±
1930	67,699		—
1940	77,677		14.7%
1950	84,462		8.7%
1960	76,103		−9.9%
1970	74,838		−1.7%
1980	64,414		−13.9%
1990	63,839		−0.9%
2000	63,568		−0.4%
2010	56,362		−11.3%
2020	57,182		1.5%

=== 21st century ===
Since 2000, gentrification has spread north from neighboring Lakeview and south from Edgewater. Developers have added more market-rate and luxury housing options, including by converting former single-room occupancy buildings. Between 2000 and 2005, median condo prices jumped more than 69 percent. In 2008, a group of residents sued the City of Chicago over its designation of the Wilson Yards lot as a Tax Increment Financing ("TIF") district.

In 2009, the Chicago Tribune reported on problems in eastern sections of Uptown where a cluster of nursing homes housed more than a thousand mentally ill residents, including several hundred felons. Some of these nursing homes have since closed.

== Neighborhoods ==
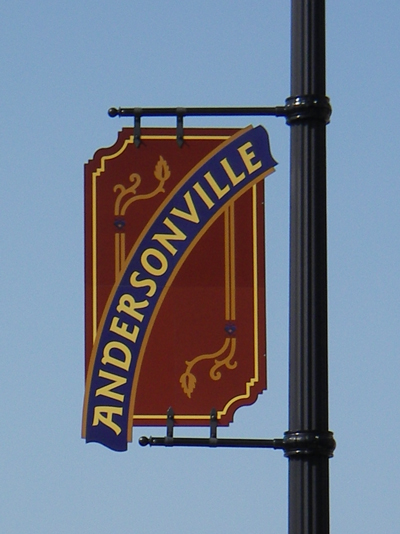
Sign for Andersonville along Clark Street.

=== Andersonville ===
Andersonville is a neighborhood in western Uptown and Edgewater known for its Swedish roots, plentiful local and independent businesses, and vibrant LGBTQ community. At its core is the Andersonville Commercial Historic District, which spans the length of Clark Street from Ainslie Street in Uptown to Rosehill Drive in Edgewater. The neighborhood traces its name to a parcel of land in Uptown bounded by Clark Street, Ravenswood Avenue, Foster Avenue, and Winnemac Avenue, on which the historic Andersonville School building was built in 1854. In the 1960s, the Uptown Clark Street Business Association successfully lobbied the city to name the neighborhood Andersonville in its honor.

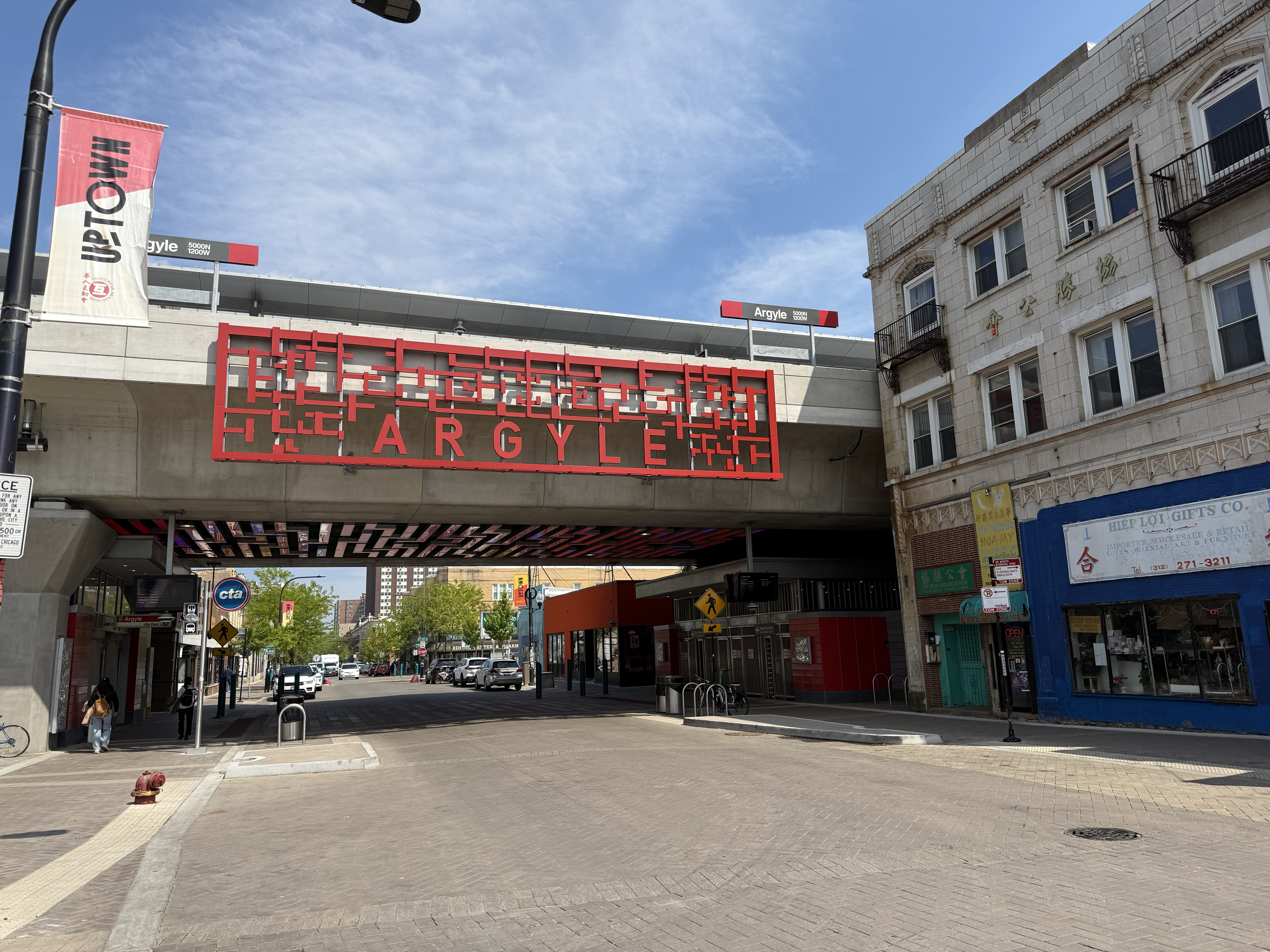
Argyle Street

=== Argyle Street ===
Also known as "Little Saigon", "Little Vietnam", "New Chinatown", and "Asia on Argyle", the Argyle Street neighborhood was once a predominantly Jewish community. In the 1970s, it became home to immigrants from China, Vietnam, and Cambodia, many of them refugees from the Vietnam War and Sino-Vietnamese War. Argyle Street hosts numerous Asian eateries, cafes, and grocery stores, including Vietnamese, Thai, Laotian, and Chinese cuisine. In the summer, the Argyle Night Market, a weekly street festival, draws tens of thousands of attendees.

The neighborhood was founded by William C. Goudy in the 1880s as Argyle Park (after Argyll, Scotland in honor of his Scottish roots). Originally a suburb outside the city limits, Argyle Park was linked to Chicago by the Evanston and Lake Superior Railroad in 1885 and was annexed to Chicago in 1889.

The West Argyle Street Historic District was entered into the National Register of Historic Places in 2010. The neighborhood is served by the Argyle stop on the CTA's Red Line and CTA buses on Sheridan Road and Broadway.

=== Buena Park ===
Buena Park is a neighborhood bounded by Montrose Avenue, Irving Park Road, Graceland Cemetery and Lake Shore Drive. At the core of the neighborhood is the Hutchinson Street Historic District, a tree-lined stretch several blocks long featuring mansions that make up "one of the best collections of Prairie-style architecture in the city." It is in sharp contrast to the skyscrapers that populate the area around it. The neighborhood was listed on the National Register of Historic Places in 1984. It can be accessed from the Sheridan stop on the CTA's Red Line.

Buena Park pre-dates the remainder of Uptown by a number of years. Around 1860, James Breckinridge Waller relocated permanently from Kentucky to Chicago and established a real estate business with his brothers William, Edward, and Henry. After retiring from business in 1867, James B. Waller began managing the large estate of his brother-in-law, Robert S. C. Aitchison Alexander, of which he was appointed administrator. James built a large home for his family on the north side of Chicago known as Buena House, and developed the surrounding area into the Buena Park neighborhood. The Wallers entertained often at Buena House, and the residence was known among Chicago's upper class for fine hospitality and lavish social events. James B. Waller died at his home in Chicago in 1887, and his widow Lucy died in 1902.

The site of the original Waller home now holds St. Mary of the Lake church (built in 1917). Buena Park is also home to one of the most active neighborhood organizations in Chicago: Buena Park Neighbors.

"The Delectable Ballad of the Waller Lot" by Chicago poet Eugene Field:

Up yonder in Buena Park
There is a famous spot,
In legend and in history
(Known as) the Waller lot.

=== Margate Park ===
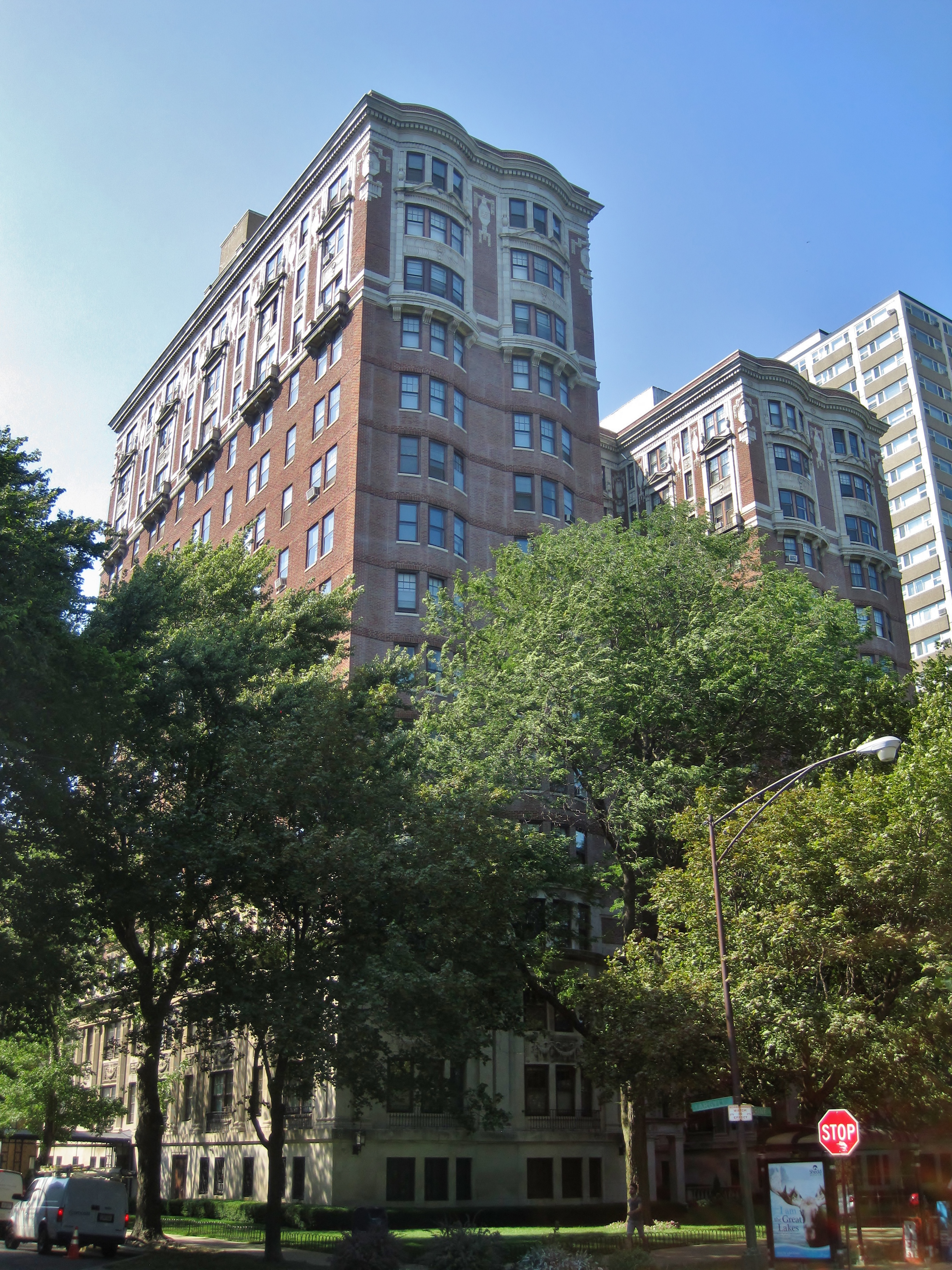
The Aquitania (built 1923) is on the National Register of Historic Places

Margate Park is situated in the northeast corner of the Uptown community, nestled between Sheridan Road and the pleasantries of the northern reaches of Lincoln Park. It is bound by Lincoln Park and Sheridan Road to its east and west, and Foster Avenue and Lawrence Avenue to its north and south, respectively.

Its tree-lined streets, historic mansions, and gilded mid-rises reflect the area's development in the bustle of Uptown's entertainment industry from the early 1900s, now undergoing a burgeoning revitalization. The diverse housing also includes ornate, imposing terracotta clad buildings, immortalized in the movies of early twentieth century Chicago as apartment hotels and boarding houses. Some of these 1920s, Jazz-Age hotels have since been converted to high-end condos and co-ops, adding to the tremendously diverse population of the area. The Margate Park community, as well as much of the Uptown neighborhood of which it is a part, is a popular and thriving home to many of the city's LGBT residents. On Margate Park's western edge is also one of the city's longest running gay bars, Big Chicks, owned and operated for the past 30 years. Designed in 1937 by architect Charles Kristen, its asymmetrical facade, clearly influenced by the 1933-34 Century of Progress Exposition in Chicago, features dazzling decoration, with yellow vertical piers on a backdrop of cobalt blue, as well as splashes of aqua. The building itself is architecturally significant for its deco facade.

Margate Park contains a Lake Shore Drive underpass near Argyle Avenue adjacent to the Margate Playground, just east of Marine Drive, which permits pedestrians and bikers easy access to the lakefront path and the Foster and Lawrence Avenue beaches.

Many of the houses here were built from the 1890s to the 1920s. Although it has remained a mostly white and wealthy area throughout the 20th century, it is a fairly integrated community. In 1940 some blacks who lived as domestic workers resided in a single block of houses in close proximity to their employers. Those houses were described by Jacalyn D. Harden, author of Double Cross: Japanese Americans in Black and White Chicago, as being "modest".

At 5000 North Marine Drive is The Aquitania, a co-op building constructed in 1923 and listed on the National Register of Historic Places since 2002. The Aquitania was built by Ralph C. Harris and Byron H. Jillson in the Classical Revival style. It was developed by George K. Spoor, the co-founder of Essanay Studios, a producer of silent movies in the first decades of the twentieth century. At this time, Chicago rivaled both New York City and Hollywood in film production, and Spoor was able to use his considerable wealth to build an apartment he felt fitting for the film stars connected with Chicago's growing entertainment industry.

=== Sheridan Park ===
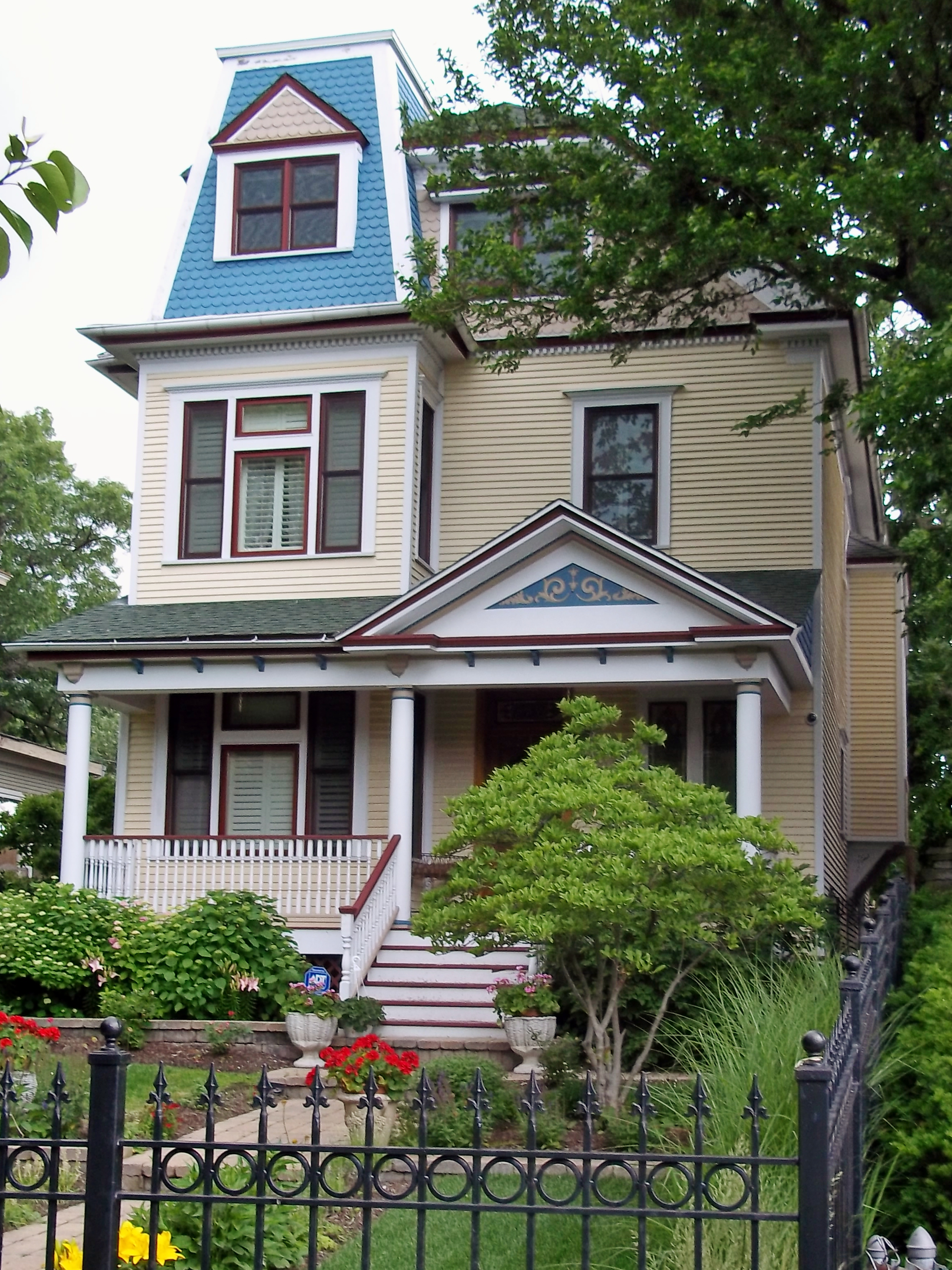
A Victorian house in the Sheridan Park Historic District

Sheridan Park is a neighborhood roughly bounded by Lawrence Avenue on the north, Clark Street on the west, Montrose on the south, and Broadway on the east. It is mostly residential, containing six-flats, single family homes, and courtyard apartment buildings. There is a growing business district along Wilson Avenue, which bisects Sheridan Park. Truman College, one of the City Colleges of Chicago, is also located in Sheridan Park. The neighborhood can be accessed from either the Wilson or Lawrence stop on the CTA's Red Line.

In 1985, the Sheridan Park Historic District (a National Landmark District) was established to protect the unique single-family and smaller multi-family architecture of the area. According to the National Park Service, the district is roughly bounded by Lawrence Avenue on the north, Clark Street on the west, Montrose on the south, and Racine on the east. Some structures of Uptown Square were also added as contributing structures.

In December 2007, the Chicago City Council approved the Dover Street Historic District in Sheridan Park. This designation covered the three northern blocks of Dover Street and four single-family homes on the west side of adjacent Beacon Street just south of Lawrence Avenue. Unlike federal Landmark District status, City landmark status limits the demolition and modification of properties without the approval of the Chicago Landmarks Commission.

== Landmarks ==
=== Uptown Entertainment District ===
Historically a very popular tourist destination, the Uptown Entertainment District is home to various music venues, nightclubs, restaurants and shops. The Uptown Entertainment District is now experiencing a revival, with new restaurants and shops opening every year. Uptown Square, at the center of the Uptown Entertainment District, was designated as a National Historic District on the National Register of Historic Places in 2000. Uptown is also a stop for Chicago Gangster tours, with many locations tied to infamous gangsters such as John Dillinger, Al Capone, Machine Gun Jack McGurn, and Roger Touhy ("Terrible Touhy").

==== Aragon Ballroom ====
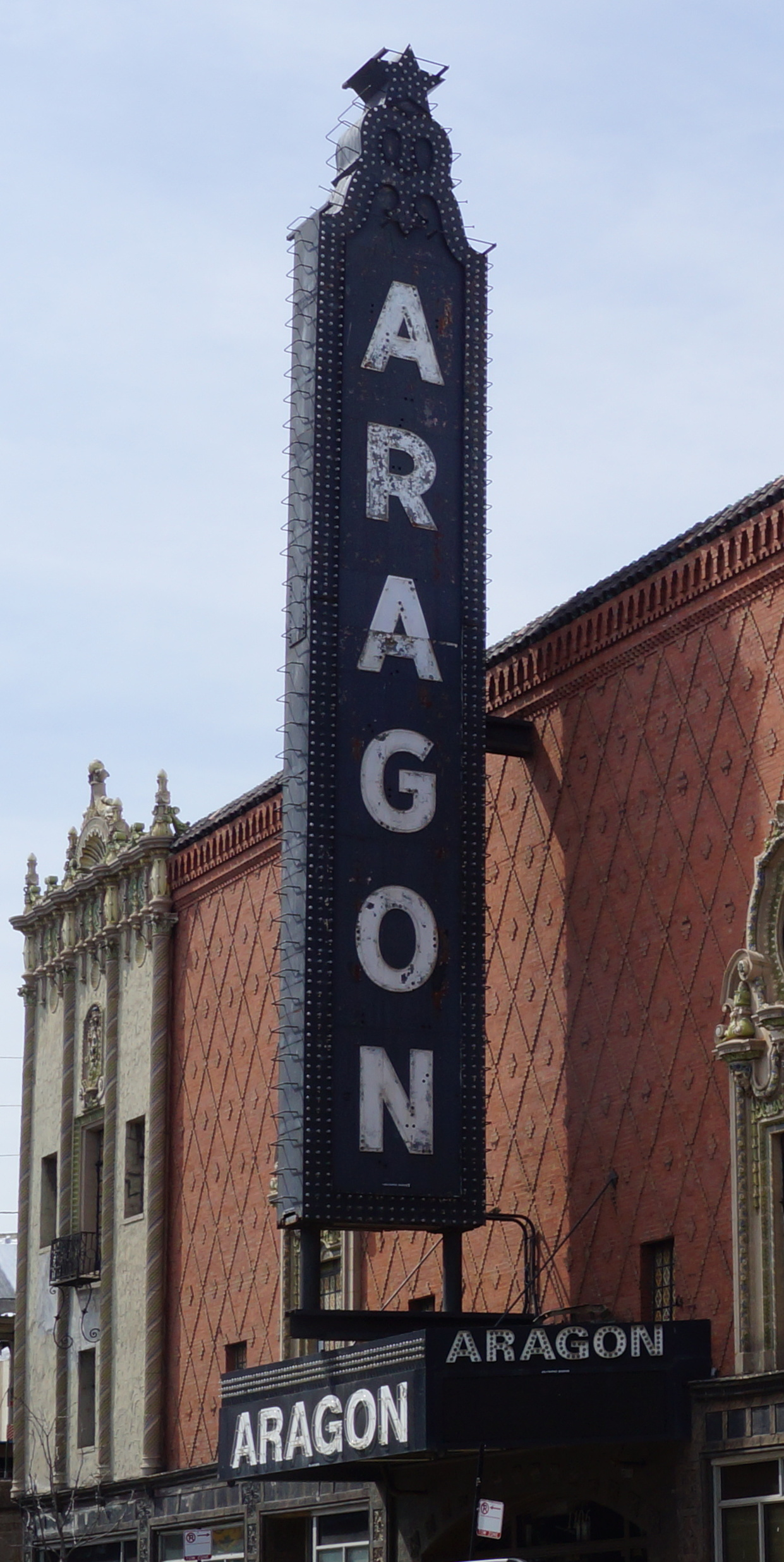
Aragon Ballroom

The Aragon Ballroom is still a very popular music venue. During the 1920s and 1930s, most of the nation's well-known jazz groups played the Aragon. Live radio broadcasts from the Aragon helped promote the Aragon's entertainers throughout the Midwest and beyond. Hotels quickly sprang up in the Uptown area, and it became a mecca for young adults who visited Chicago to dance to the Big Bands of the 1940s and 1950s. Frank Sinatra, Tommy Dorsey, Glenn Miller, Benny Goodman, Duke Ellington, Lawrence Welk, Guy Lombardo, Wayne King and other famous bandleaders often played there. In decades to follow, a very diverse selection of "big name" groups have performed, including The Rolling Stones, U2, The Smiths, The Doors, Snoop Dogg, Green Day, Gwen Stefani, The B-52s, Capital Cities, Talking Heads/David Byrne, B.B. King, Robert Plant, Metallica, Tommy Bolin, Morrissey, Queens of the Stone Age, The Clash, Tangerine Dream, deadmau5, Tiësto, Nirvana, and The Ramones.

The Aragon Ballroom is located at the intersection of Lawrence and Winthrop Avenues, just adjacent to the Lawrence Red Line 'L' stop.

==== Riviera Theater ====
The Riviera Theater, also a popular music venue, was once a Jazz Age movie palace which featured live jazz performances with the movies. In the 1980s, the seats were removed on the main floor, and it was converted to a concert venue.

==== Uptown Theatre ====
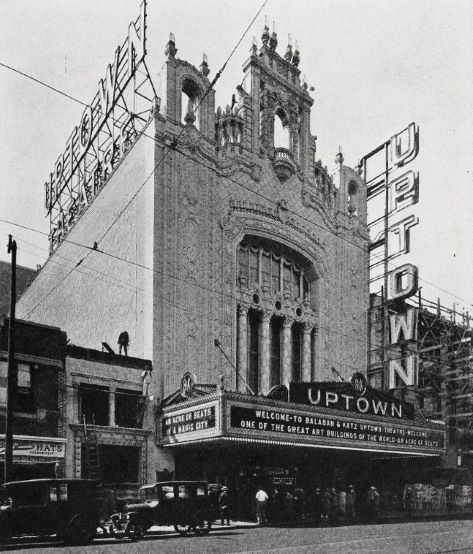
Uptown Theatre, 4816 N Broadway (as seen in 1925)

The Uptown Theatre is a large, ornate movie palace with almost 4,500 seats. The largest in Chicago, this architectural gem is on several Landmark Registers. The Uptown Theatre was designed by famous movie palace architects, Rapp and Rapp, who also designed the Chicago Theatre in the Chicago Loop. It was managed by the Balaban and Katz Company.

The Uptown Theatre as of 2018 will begin renovation, after numerous attempts, by Friends of the Uptown Theatre and other local groups to restore and reopen the theater with $75 million renaissance plan. Progress was stymied for years by various legal issues, including disputes by multiple mortgage holders and city liens. However, on August 18, 2008, the Uptown Theatre was sold to Jam Productions Ltd, a Chicago-based music promoter who has committed to bringing a spectacular entertainment venue comparable to the Chicago Theatre in the Loop's Theatre District downtown. In November 2019, the Chicago Tribune reported that the start of the renovation was still stalled due to slow private fundraising needed for the project. Development plans, within blocks, call for renovation of the former AON Insurance building to luxury mixed use retail and apartments already in progress, new high-rise apartment/retail building at Broadway and Winona Street, new parking structure on Lawrence at the Redline, and plans for a new high-rise luxury hotel.

A 2006 documentary, Uptown: Portrait of a Palace, shows the interior of the theatre. It is also featured on the cover of the book The Chicago Movie Palaces of Balaban and Katz by David Balaban.

==== Green Mill Cocktail Lounge ====
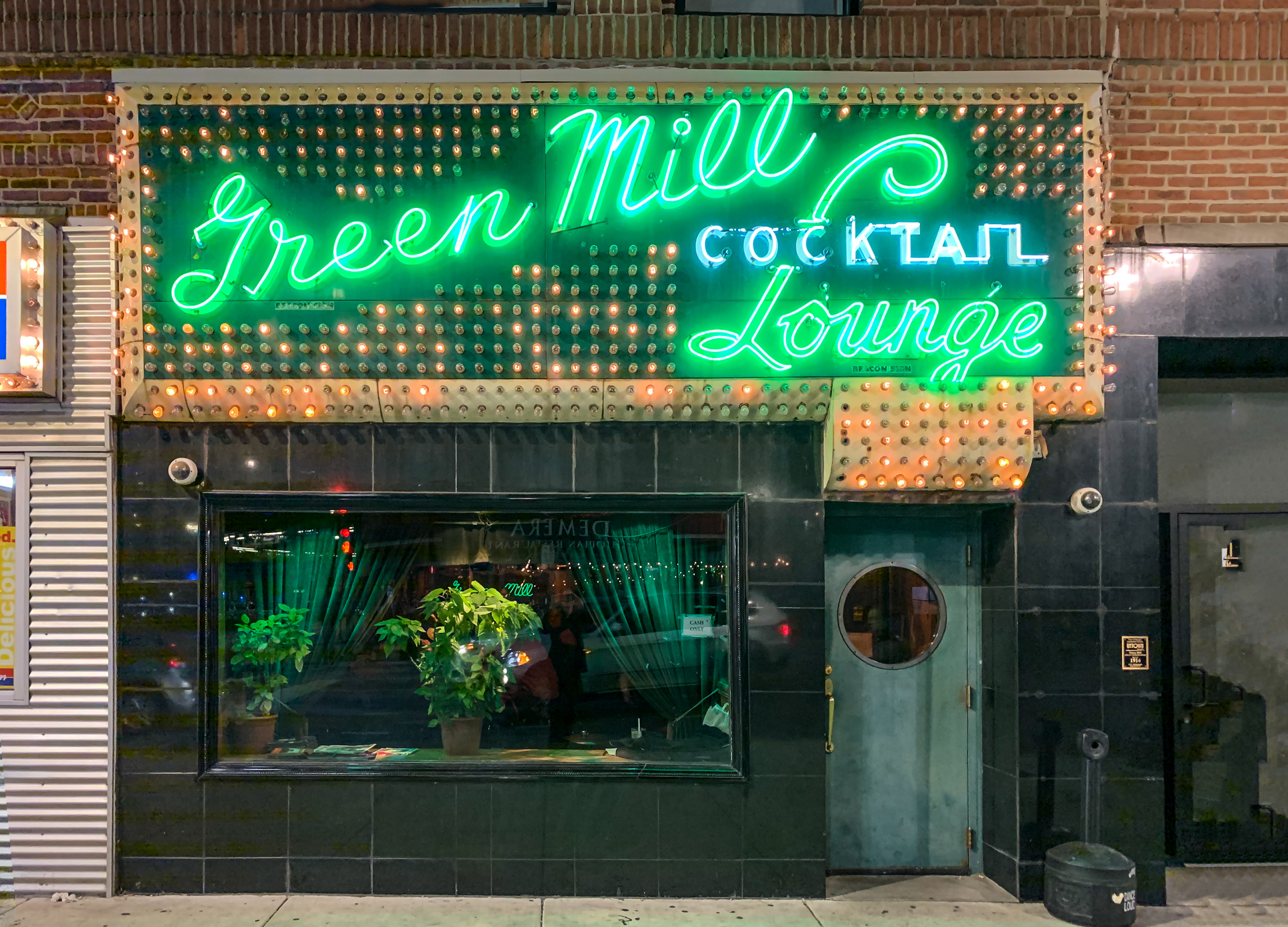
Green Mill Cocktail Lounge, 4802 N Broadway

The Green Mill Cocktail Lounge is located at 4802 N. Broadway in Chicago, on the site of a much bigger Green Mill Gardens complex, which was an outdoor music gardens fashioned after The Moulin Rouge Gardens in Paris. It was a sunken gardens area, surrounded by a wall and featured nightly entertainment during the summer months. It also featured a dining room which was later converted to the Green Mill Cocktail Lounge during construction of the Uptown Theatre on the former site of the outdoor music gardens. The club was once owned by "Machine Gun" Jack McGurn, a right-hand man of Al Capone, who was a regular patron at The Green Mill. The 1957 movie The Joker Is Wild is based on the life of a regular performer at the Green Mill, Joe E. Lewis. Starring Frank Sinatra, the movie is the story about how Lewis tried to leave his gig at the Green Mill and was attacked and left for dead in his apartment. Lewis survived and continued his successful career in California. The Green Mill still hosts top jazz performers. Patricia Barber, internationally acclaimed jazz performer, plays there most Monday nights, as she has for the past 15 + years. In 2008, Kurt Elling was a regularly featured performer with his current band. The Green Mill also hosts a weekly Poetry Slam. Poet Marc Smith is credited for developing the Poetry Slam, and still hosts the weekly events at the Green Mill.

==== Uptown Broadway Building ====
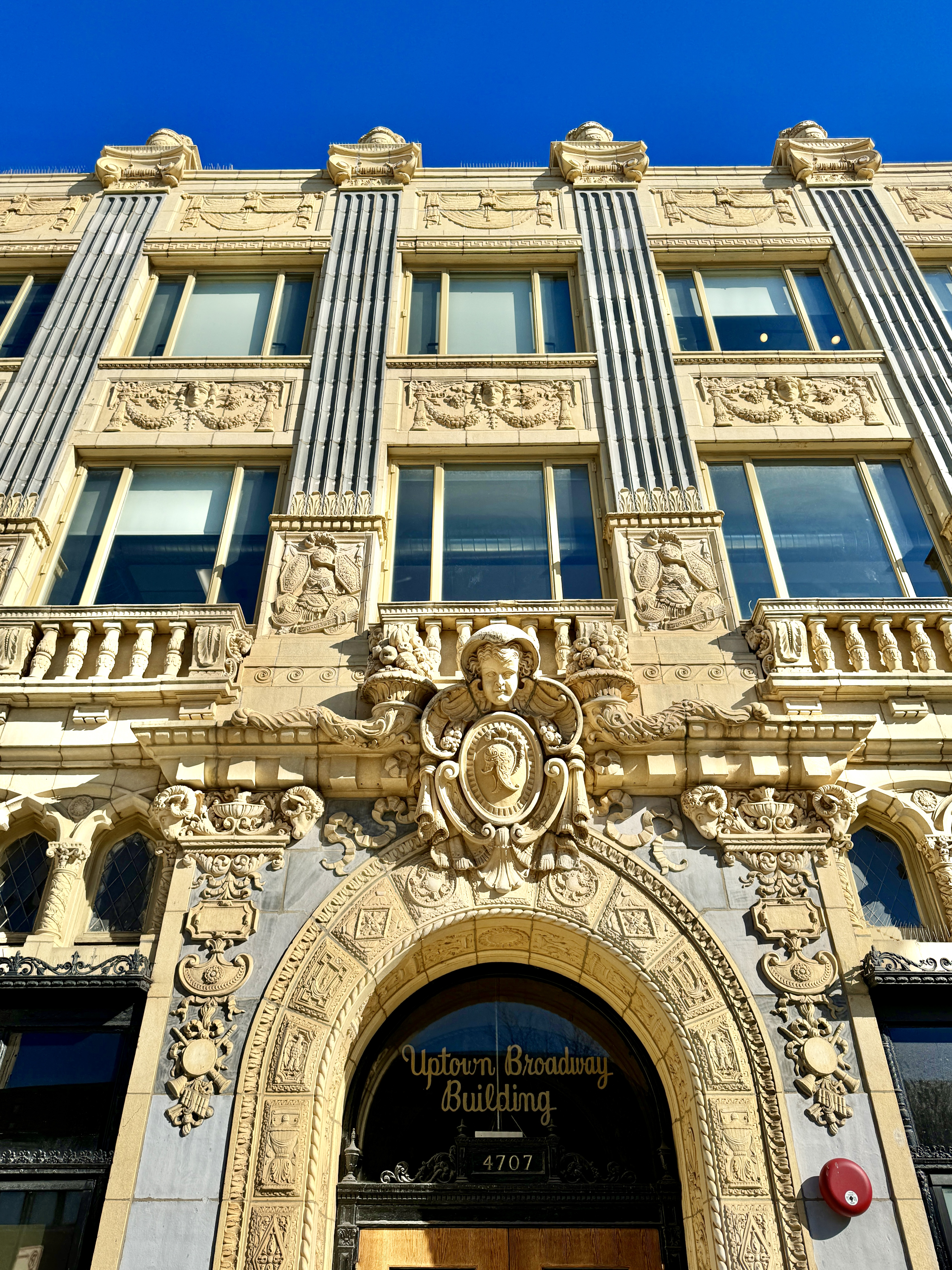
Uptown Broadway Building

The Uptown Broadway Building was built in 1926. It has served as the home of Kiss Kiss Cabaret, the Baton Show Lounge, and the Chicago Eagle leather bar.

==== Former venues ====
===== The Rainbo =====
The Rainbo, at 4812 N. Clark Street, was purchased in 2002 and torn down to make way for a new condo and townhouse development. At one point, however, it was a very popular outdoor music garden, fashioned after the Moulin Rouge Gardens in Paris, which is the original namesake for what was then called "Moulin Rouge Gardens."

Investors bought the Moulin Rouge Gardens property and spent one-million dollars to expand the facility. Opened in 1921, Mann's Million Dollar Rainbo Room, named after Fred Mann's wartime service in the U.S. Army's 42nd Infantry or "Rainbow" Division, was said to be the largest nightclub in America, featuring some of the biggest names in Vaudeville and musical entertainment. Larry Fine was performing there the night he was asked to join The Three Stooges. The Rainbo Room had a revolving stage to allow for continuous entertainment. There was table seating for 2,000 patrons and space on the dance floor for an additional 1,500. Until 1927, WMAQ radio shared the 670 kilohertz frequency with station WQJ, which was owned by the Rainbo and Calumet Baking Powder Company; it broadcast music of the Rainbo's performers as a form of promotion.

In 1927, during prohibition, it was converted to a major casino and sports venue, called the Rainbo Fronton.

In 1934, during the Chicago World's Fair (Century of Progress), it became French Casino. The French Casino is where John Dillinger spent his birthday, June 22, 1934, a month before he was shot.

In 1939, it became Mike Todd's Theater Cafe, which was a popular dinner theater. Tommy Sutton, the Theater Cafe's choreographer, went on to work with Cab Calloway, Duke Ellington and Nat King Cole, among others. It was also a venue for Championship Wrestling where, in 1955, the first women's tag team wrestling match was held.

In 1957, The Theater Cafe was converted to an ice skating rink, called Rainbo Arena, which was a practice rink for the Chicago Blackhawks including the year they won the 1961 Stanley Cup. The Rainbo Arena was also a training rink for several Olympic figure skaters, and during much of the 1960s was the only indoor hockey rink in the Chicago area open to the public. Several hockey leagues were headquartered at Rainbo, and particularly on weekends, hockey-playing groups would rent the ice at all hours of the day and night.

The south end of the building housed a pro bowling alley in the 1960s which was converted in 1968 into the original Electric Theatre/Kinetic Playground music venue.

In the 1970s and thereafter, Rainbo was a popular late night roller rink until it was torn down for a new housing development called Rainbo Village. When the building was being demolished in 2003, an assortment of human bones and tennis shoes were discovered in what had been the building's basement. How the bones and shoes ended up there has remained unresolved.

===== Arcadia Ballroom =====
The Arcadia Ballroom, at 4444 N. Broadway was one of the first Dance Halls in Chicago. Promoter Paddy Harmon, who later developed Dreamland Ballroom and the Chicago Stadium, found that black jazz bands were popular with the Arcadia Ballroom late night crowds. It was one of the few places on the north side of Chicago which would book black jazz bands in the 1920s and 1930s, the other being the Green Mill Jazz Club. The building was destroyed in a fire in the 1950s.

===== 5100 Club =====
The 5100 Club, at 5100 N. Broadway, was a nightclub that hosted comedy performances before the advent of television. One regular headliner was Danny Thomas, who was discovered there by the head of the William Morris Agency. Danny would later go on to star in movies and in "Make Room For Daddy", one of the longest running sitcoms in American Television history.

=== Graceland Cemetery ===
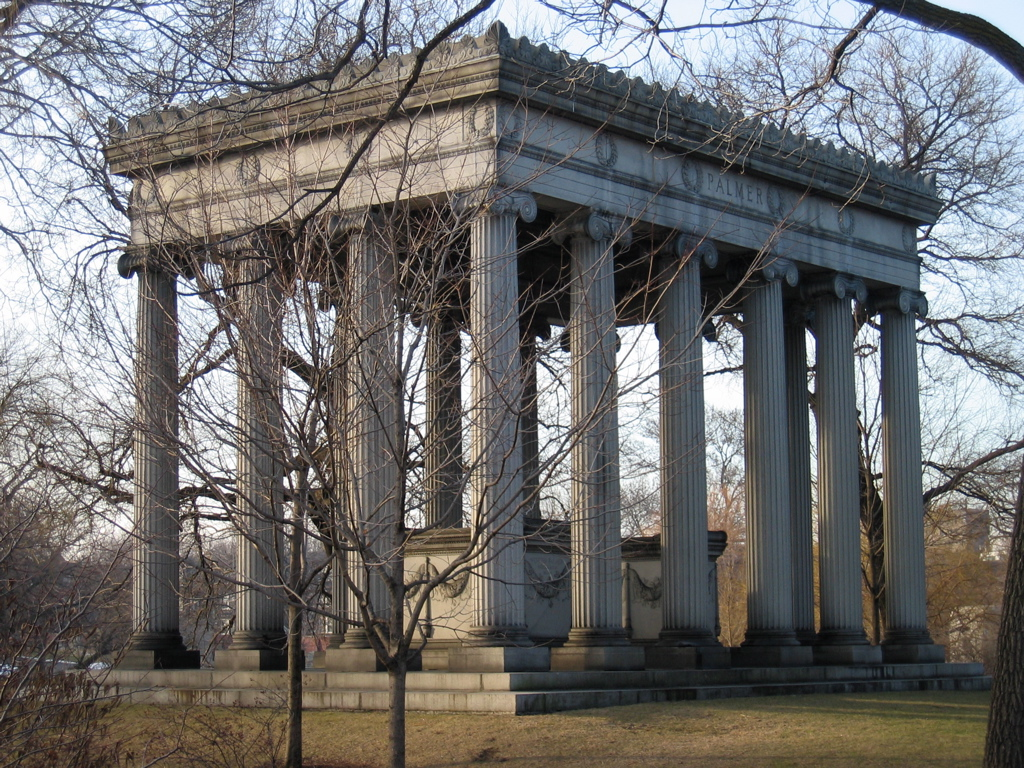
The mausoleum of Potter Palmer and Bertha Honoré Palmer in Graceland Cemetery

In southwestern Uptown is historic Graceland Cemetery. Visitors here can find the elaborate tombs of Chicago's famed dead. Because some of Chicago's famous architects designed memorials and are buried here, the Chicago Architecture Foundation and the Chicago History Museum offer several walking tours of the cemetery during the spring, summer, and fall.

=== Winthrop Family Historical Garden ===
The Winthrop Family Historical Garden was established in 2009 as a community greenspace on the 4600 block of Winthrop. It was renovated in 2022 through a City of Chicago Public Outdoor Plaza (POP!) grant. It commemorates the history of 4600 block of North Winthrop Avenue, which in 1931 was listed due to restrictive covenants by Chicago Uptown Association as the only block on which blacks could live or open establishments. The residents developed a close-knit community they named the "Winthrop Family"

== Amenities ==
=== Parks and leisure ===
Uptown is full of parkland, chiefly Lincoln Park, providing ample opportunity for sports, leisure, and nature exploration.

For sports and exercise, Lincoln Park contains soccer and athletic fields, the Chicago lakefront bicycle/running path, a golf course, a sledding hill, and the Wilson Skate Park. Chase Park, located on the west side of Clark Street at Leland Avenue, has indoor and outdoor athletic facilities, as well as an outdoor pool and tennis courts. Clarendon Park and Margate Park, both feature athletic fields, children's playgrounds and indoor sports facilities.

Dog lovers can visit Uptown's Montrose Dog Beach or its Puptown Dog Park in Margate Park. Other leisure opportunities include Montrose Beach and Montrose Harbor, a marina for local and transient boaters and home to the Chicago Corinthian Yacht Club.

The Montrose Beach Dunes Natural Area features dunes, wetlands, and the Montrose Point Bird Sanctuary that provide refuge for endangered plants and animals. One block north, the Uptown Natural Area provides nature trails through six aces of prairie and savanna.

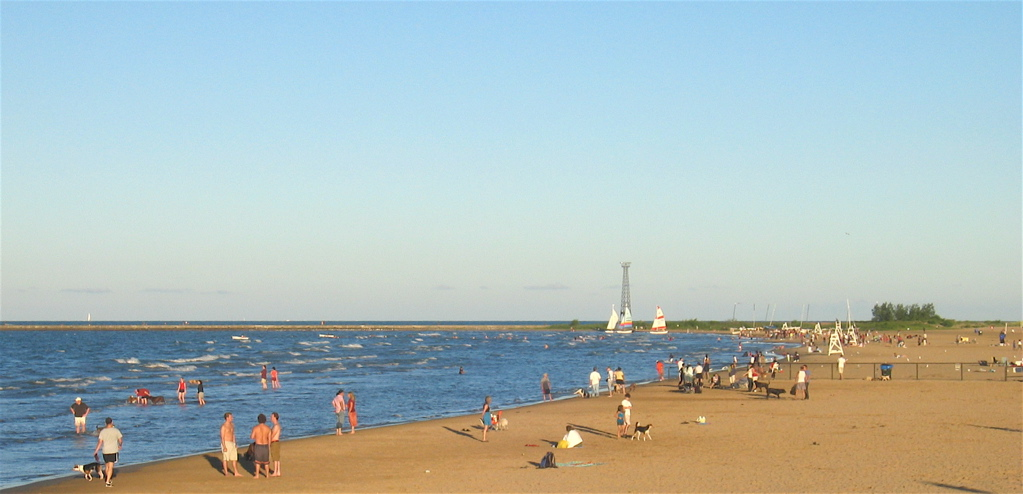
Montrose Beach

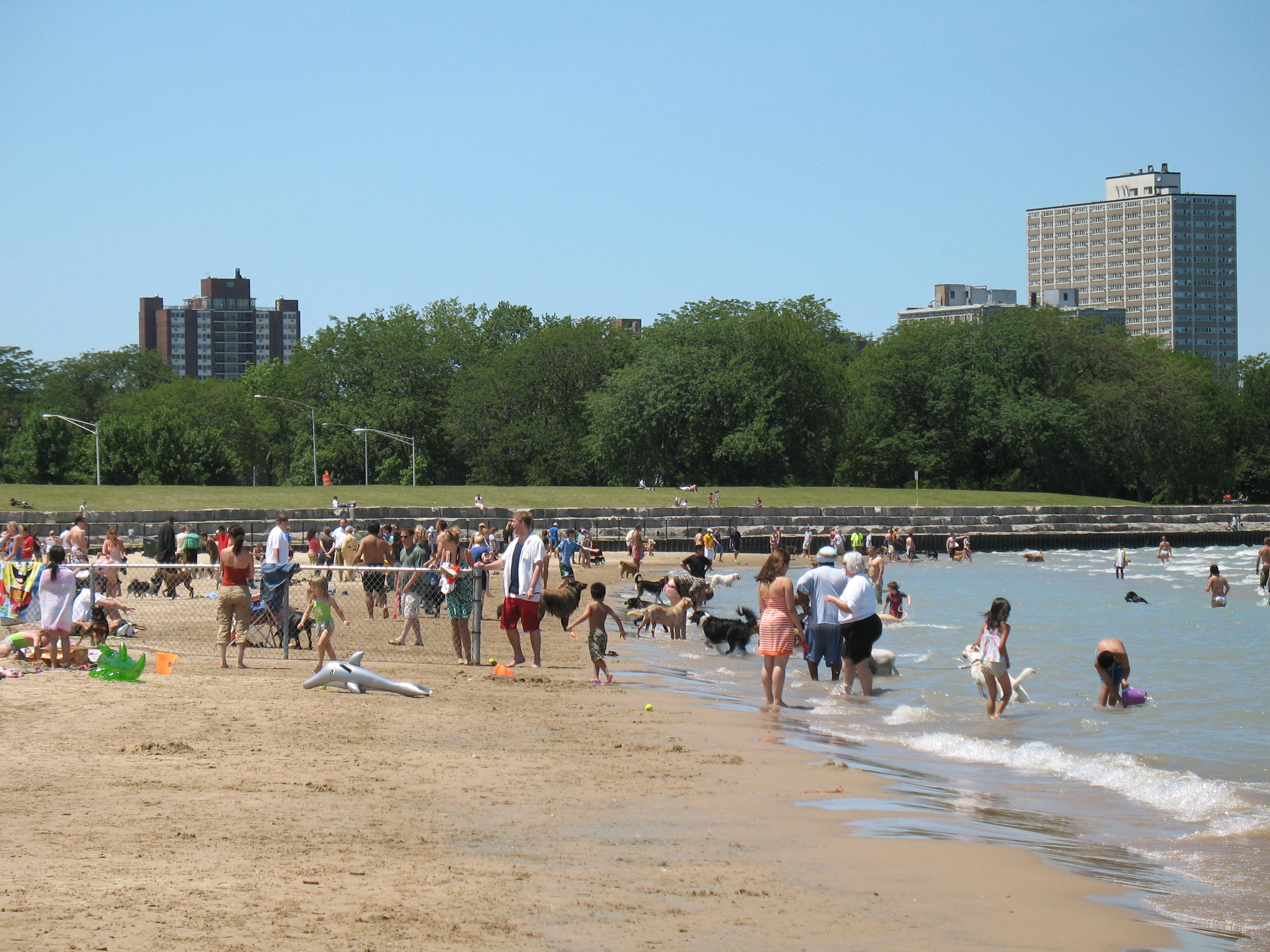
Montrose Dog Beach (visible in background)

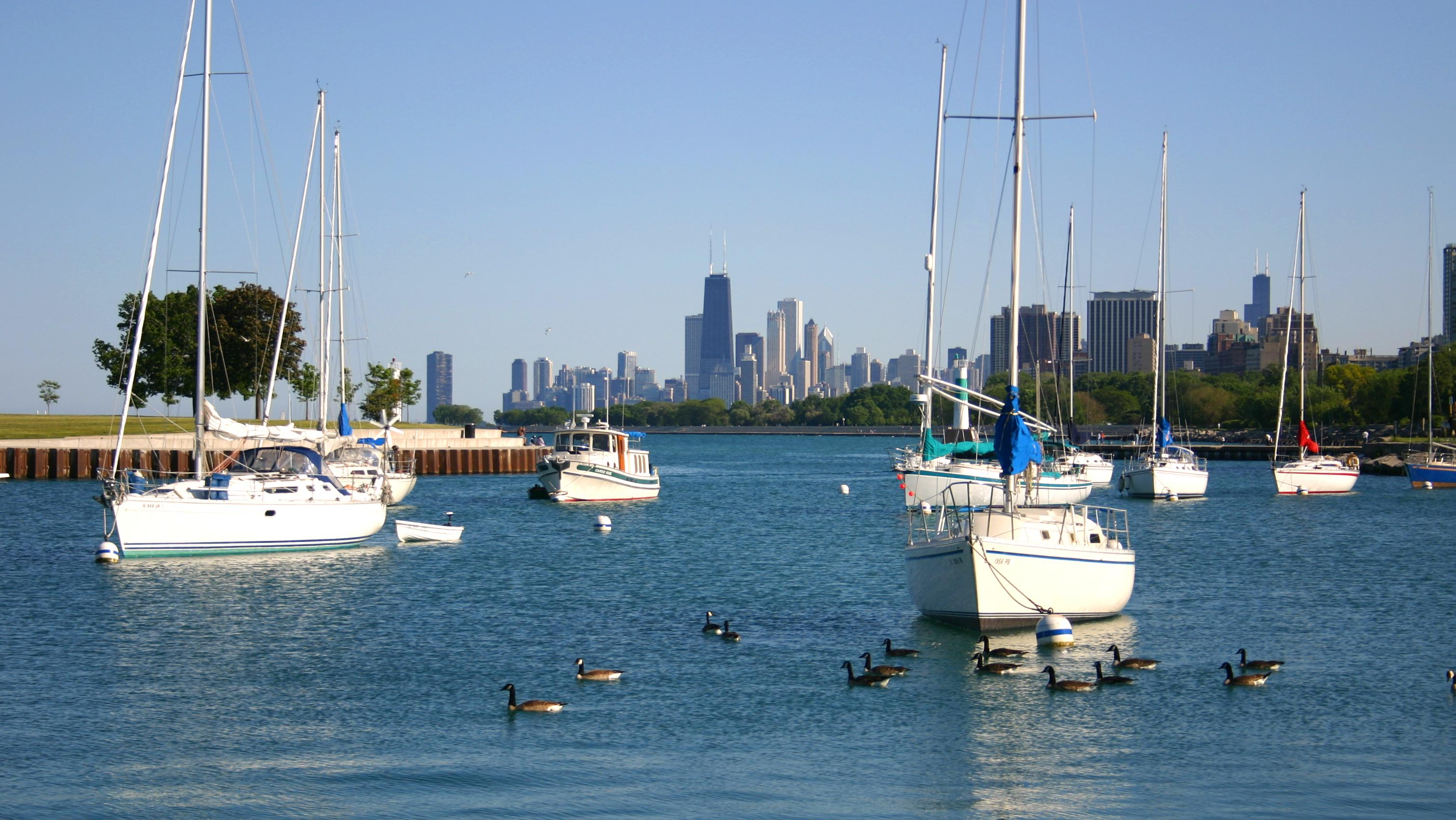
Montrose Harbor

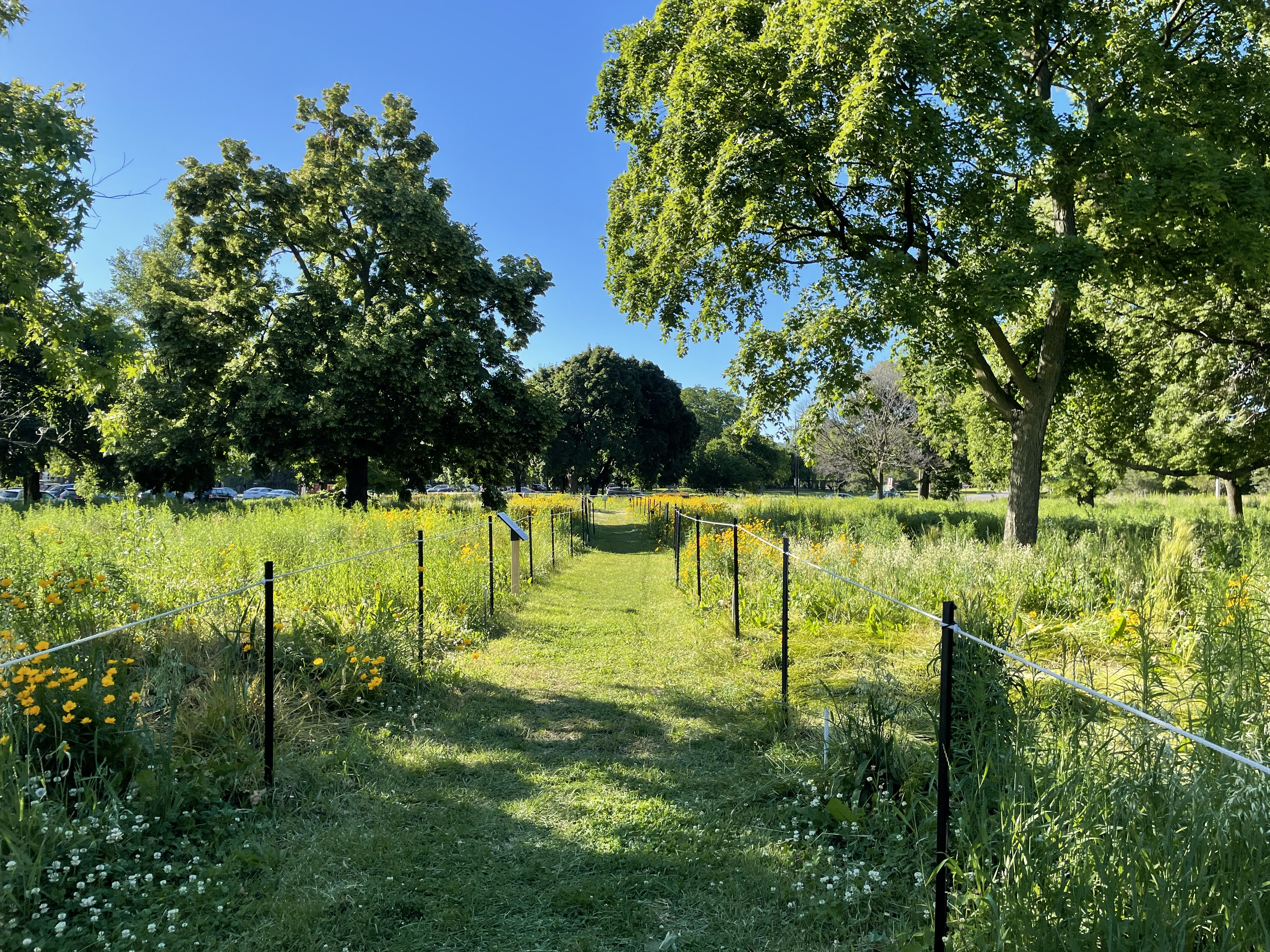
Uptown Natural Area

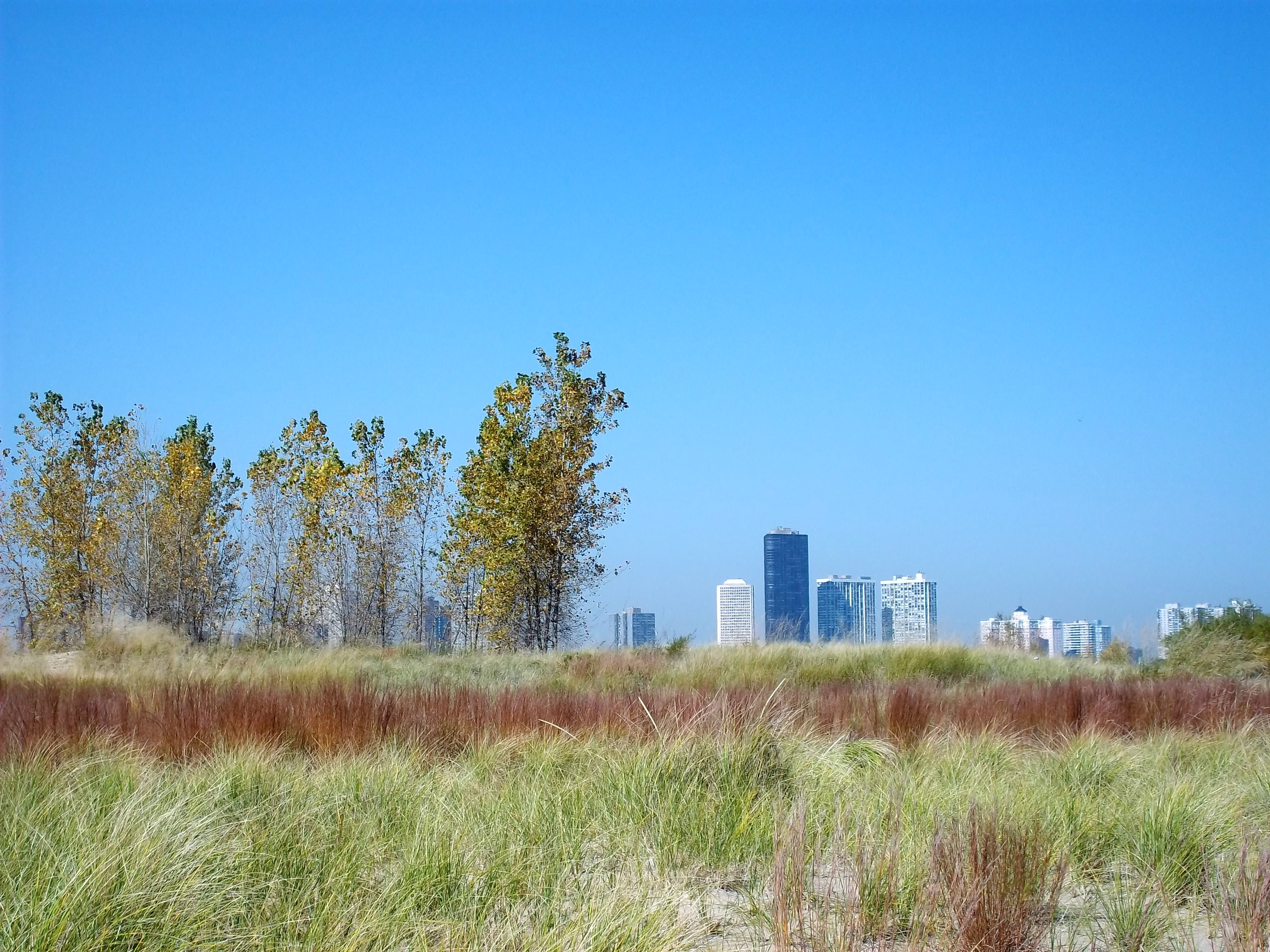
Montrose Beach Dunes Natural Area

=== Hospitals ===
- Thorek Memorial Hospital
- Thorek Memorial Hospital Andersonville
- Montrose Behavioral Health Hospital

=== Schools ===
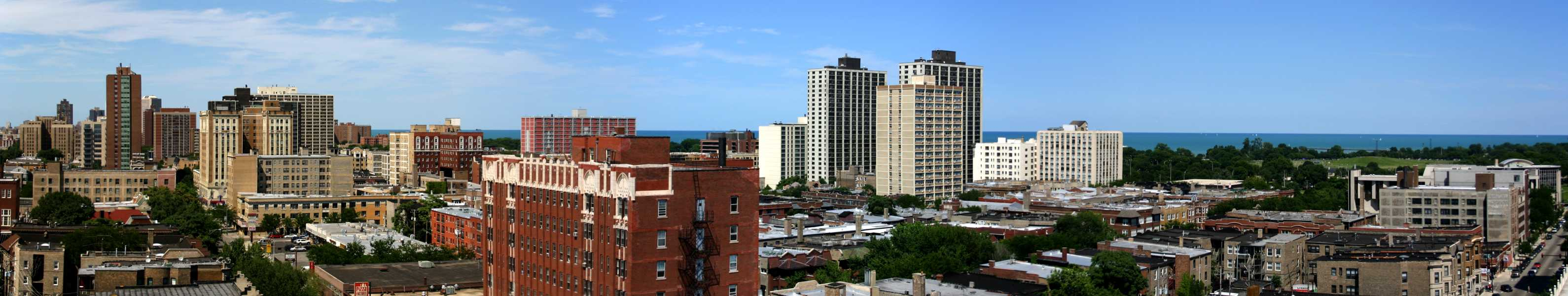
Skyline of Uptown, Chicago, looking northeast

Chicago Public Schools operates district public schools:

K-8 schools serving sections of Uptown:

- Brennemann Elementary School
- William C. Goudy Elementary School
- McCutcheon Elementary School
- McPherson Elementary School
- Ravenswood Elementary School
- Stockton Elementary School
- Courtenay Language Arts Center

Most residents are zoned to Senn High School while those west of Ashland are zoned to Amundsen High School.

CPS magnet schools:

- Walt Disney Magnet School

High schools:

- Uplift Community High School

Private schools:

- St. Mary of the Lake Elementary School
- St. Thomas of Canterbury Elementary School

Colleges and universities:

- Harry S Truman College
- St. Augustine College
- American Islamic College

=== Libraries ===
Chicago Public Library:

- Bezazian Branch - Began operations on January 26, 1957.
- Uptown Branch - Began operations on June 5, 1993.

=== Cultural ===
- Haitian American Museum of Chicago
- TimeLine Theatre Company

== Politics and government ==
=== United States Congress ===
Most of Uptown is located in Illinois's 9th congressional district, and some of the westernmost part of the community area is located in the 5th congressional district.

District	Representative	Took office
9th congressional district	Jan Schakowsky	1999
5th congressional district	Mike Quigley	2009

=== Politics ===
Uptown has supported the Democratic Party in the past two presidential elections. In 2016, Democrat Hillary Clinton received 23,815 votes, 85.6% over Republican Donald Trump's 2,481 votes, or 8.9%. In 2020, Democrat Joe Biden won 27,009 votes, 88.0%, and Trump received 3,154 votes, 10.3%.

=== Chicago City Council ===
As of 2022, Uptown is divided among the Chicago City Council's 40th, 46th, 47th, and 48th wards, with the majority of its territory falling within the 46th and 48th. As of 2025, it is represented by the following alderpersons:

Ward	Alderperson	Assumed office
46th ward	Angela Clay	2023
48th ward	Leni Manaa-Hoppenworth	2023
40th ward	Andre Vasquez	2019
47th ward	Matt Martin	2019

== Transportation ==
Uptown is served by the Chicago Transit Authority's Argyle station, Lawrence station, and Wilson station, on the CTA's Red Line, which provides 24-hour service between Rogers Park and Roseland.

Just to the west of the Uptown neighborhood is Ravenswood station on Metra's Union Pacific North Line, which provides commuter rail service between Kenosha station and Ogilvie Transportation Center. The Chicago Transit Authority's #92 Foster, #81 Lawrence, #78 Montrose, #80 Irving Park, #22 Clark, #36 Broadway, #146 Inner Drive Express & #151 Sheridan bus lines serve the neighborhood. For cyclists, the neighborhood is best traversed by Broadway (North/South) and Lawrence Avenue (East/West), both of which have bicycle lanes on all or some of the road. For motorists, Lake Shore Drive has exit ramps at Foster Avenue, Lawrence Avenue, Wilson Avenue, Montrose Avenue, and Irving Park Road.

== Notable people ==
- Bob Fosse (1927–1987), choreographer, dancer, and film and stage director. He was a childhood resident of 4428 North Paulina Street. The block was designated "Bob Fosse Way," in his honor.
- Eric Gunnar Gibson (1919–1944), soldier in the United States Army and recipient of the Medal of Honor for his actions in World War II. He was a childhood resident of Uptown and lived at 4040 North Broadway.
- Harold Ernest Goettler (1890–1918), aviator in the United States Army Air Service awarded the Medal of Honor for valor during the search for the Lost Battalion. He was raised at 4630 North Dover Street.
- Talen Horton-Tucker (born 2000), NBA player. He was a childhood resident of Uptown.
- William C. Marland (1918–1965), politician and 24th Governor of West Virginia. After his time as Governor, he lived at a YMCA at 1725 West Wilson Avenue from 1961 to 1965 while working as a taxi cab driver and recovering from alcoholism.
- George R. R. Martin (born 1948), novelist and short story writer best known for A Song of Ice and Fire. He lived in Uptown while performing alternative service work as a VISTA volunteer attached to the Cook County Legal Assistance Foundation.
- Ayanna Pressley (born 1974), member of the United States House of Representatives from Massachusetts's 7th congressional district since 2019. Pressley was a childhood resident of Uptown, moving to attend college at Boston University.
- Carl Sandburg (1878–1967), biographer, journalist, editor, and poet notable for Chicago Poems. He lived in an apartment at 4646 North Hermitage Avenue from 1912 to 1915.
- Iva Toguri D'Aquino (1916–2006), English-language radio broadcaster forced to transmit Radio Tokyo's propaganda to Allied soldiers in the South Pacific during World War II on The Zero Hour radio show. Toguri lived in a three-flat in Uptown after the War.
