= Sheridan Park Historic District =

- U.S. National Register of Historic Places
- U.S. Historic district
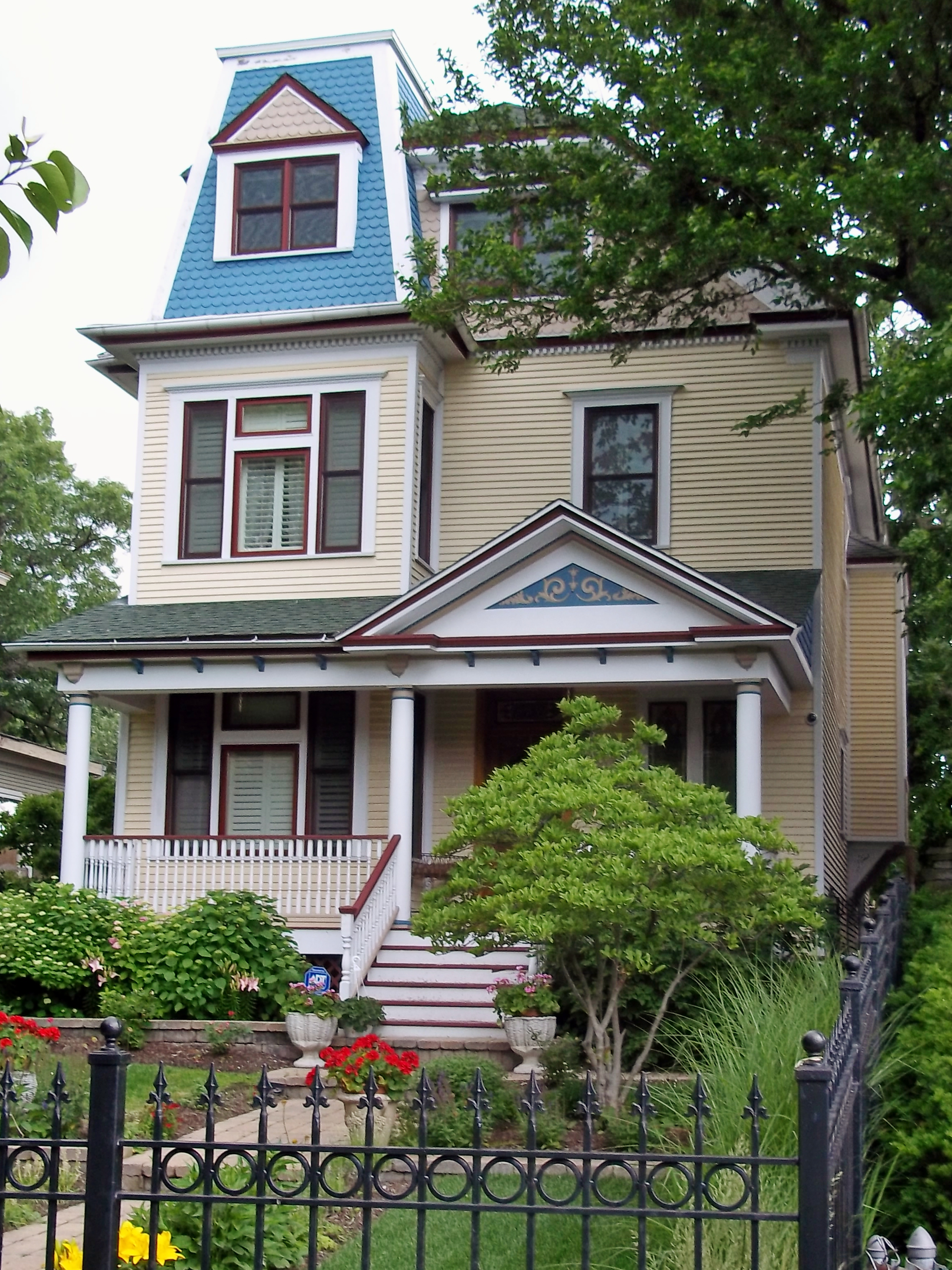

- Location within Chicago metropolitan area Location within Illinois Location within the United States
- Location: Roughly bounded by Lawrence, Racine, and Montrose Aves., and Clark St., Chicago, Illinois
- Coordinates: 41°57′55″N 87°39′47″W
- Area: 117 acres (47 ha)
- NRHP reference No.: 85003352
- Added to NRHP: December 27, 1985

The Sheridan Park Historic District is a residential historic district in the Uptown neighborhood of Chicago, Illinois. Developed between 1891 and 1929, the district is a collection of single-family homes, small apartment buildings, and a handful of larger apartment hotels. The homes were built early in the district's development, with nearly all of them completed by 1910; at the time, the district was planned as a spacious suburb and categorized with North Shore communities. The apartments were all built in the twentieth century as the dense city core of Chicago expanded into the district. The district includes a large collection of six-flat apartments in particular; small apartments such as these, which were only three stories tall, fit neatly among the single-family houses of the original neighborhood.

The district was added to the National Register of Historic Places on December 27, 1985.

Despite the federal historic designation, in the 1990s and 2000s, many of the finer homes in the district were torn down to be replaced with new condominium developments. These teardowns included the oldest home in the district located on the 4600 block of North Beacon Street. Teardowns in the district continue and most recently in early 2020, two mixed-use, residential-commercial buildings on the east side of the 4600 block of North Clark Street were demolished.

The lack of protection afforded by the federal historic district designation led residents on Dover Street in 2005 to begin seeking city landmark district designation. The process was completed in 2007. Since that time, a number of historic properties on Dover Street have been successfully renovated and expanded while maintaining their historic facades. Among the noteworthy architects whose work can be found on Dover Street are James Gamble Rogers, who later designed many buildings for Northwestern and Yale universities, and E.E. Roberts, a prairie-school contemporary of Frank LLoyd Wright.
