= Ridge Avenue =

Street in Illinois, United States

- Ridge Boulevard
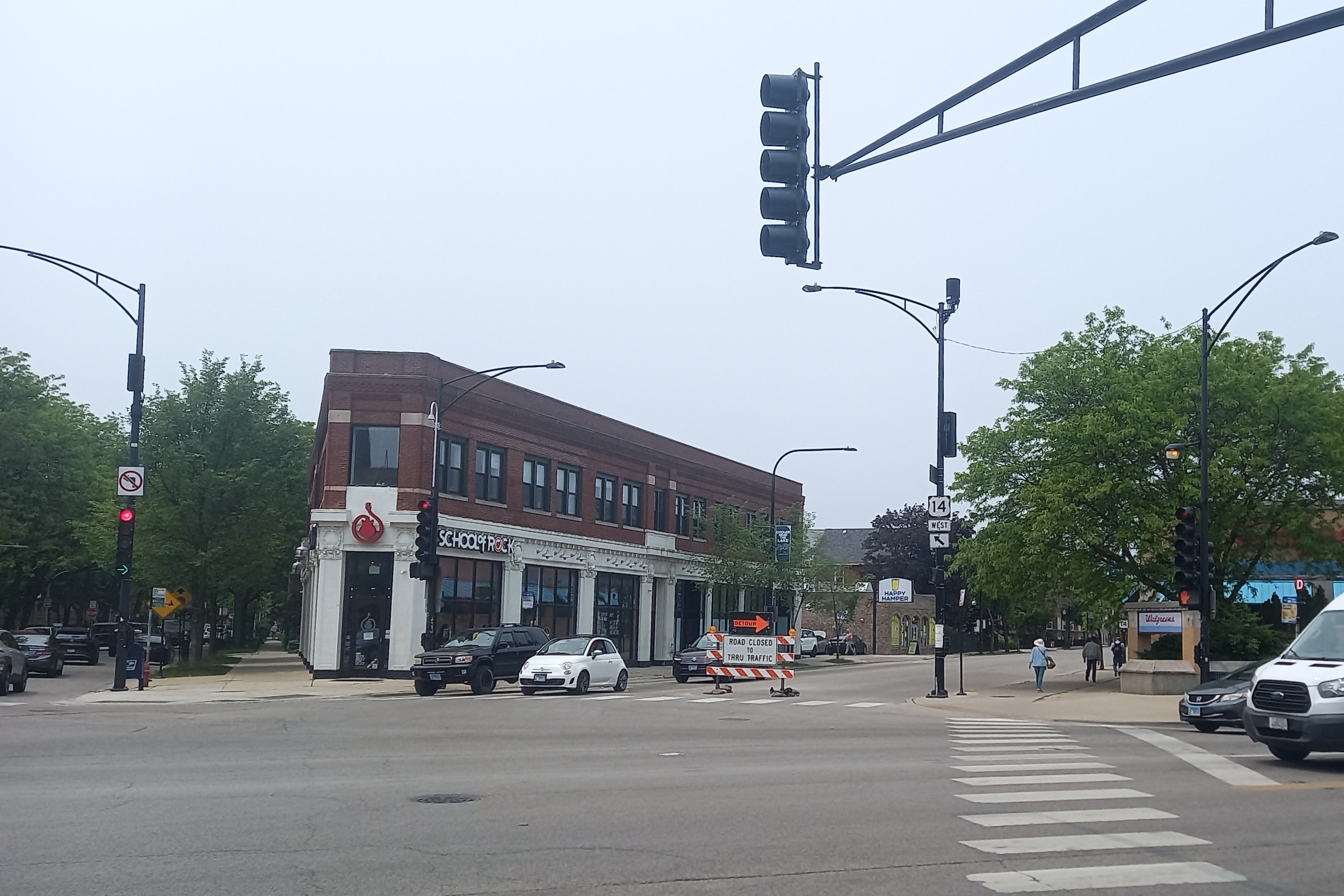
- Ridge Avenue at Broadway and Bryn Mawr Avenue
- Part of: US 14
- Length: 6.40 mi (10.30 km)
- Location: Chicago–Evanston, Illinois
- South end: US 14 (Broadway and Bryn Mawr Avenue) in Chicago
- North end: Sheridan Road in Evanston

Ridge Avenue, also called Ridge Boulevard from Devon Avenue and Howard Street, is a street in Chicago and Evanston.

== Route description ==
The road begins at Broadway and Bryn Mawr Avenue in Chicago. From here, it carries U.S. Route 14 to Peterson Avenue. U.S. Route 14 continues south onto Broadway and west onto Peterson Avenue. Between the two intersections, the street also intersects with Clark Street.

The next streets that intersect with Ridge Avenue (called Ridge Boulevard between the first and last streets in the upcoming list) are Devon Avenue, Touhy Avenue, and Howard Street. At Howard Street, Ridge Avenue leaves Chicago and enters Evanston. En route to its north end at Sheridan Road, it also intersects with Dempster Street.

The road is so named because it follows the ancient shoreline of Lake Michigan (formerly Lake Checaugou).

== Major intersections ==
The entire route is in Cook County.

Location	mi	km	Destinations	Notes
Chicago	0.0	0.0	US 14 east (North Broadway)	Southern terminus; southern end of US 14 concurrency
Chicago	0.8	1.3	US 14 west (West Peterson Avenue)	Northern end of US 14 concurrency
Evanston	6.4	10.3	Isabella Street / Sheridan Road	Northern terminus
1.000 mi = 1.609 km; 1.000 km = 0.621 mi: Concurrency terminus

== See also ==
- U.S. Route 14
