= Buena Park Historic District =

- U.S. National Register of Historic Places
- U.S. Historic district
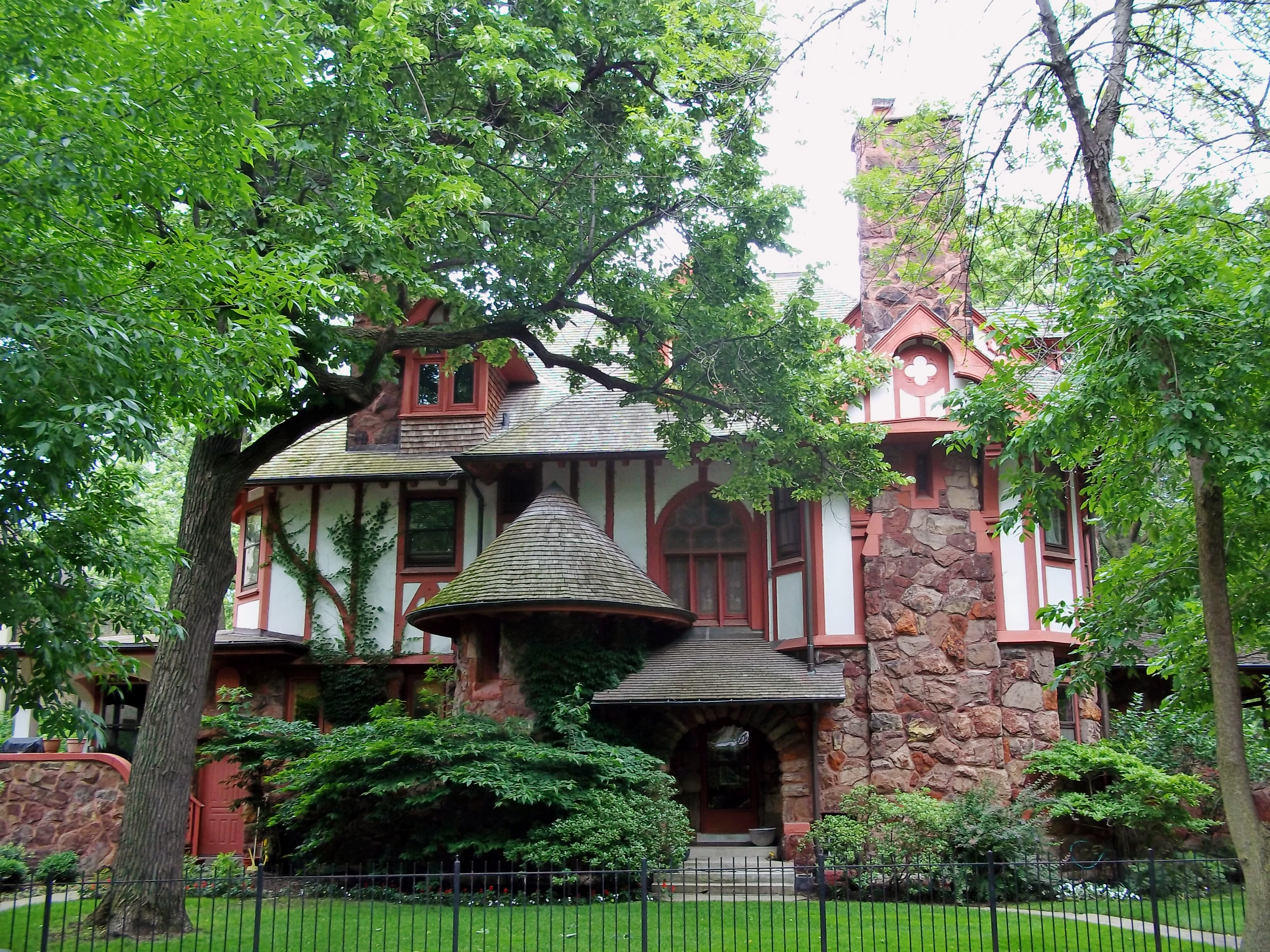

- Location within Chicago metropolitan area Location within Illinois Location within the United States
- Location: Roughly bounded by Graceland Cemetery, Marine Drive, Irving Park Road, & Montrose Ave., Chicago, Illinois
- Coordinates: 41°57′29″N 87°39′06″W
- Area: 326 acres (132 ha)
- NRHP reference No.: 84000937
- Added to NRHP: July 13, 1984

The Buena Park Historic District is a residential historic district in the Uptown neighborhood of Chicago, Illinois. First developed in the 1890s, the district was originally planned to be an upper-class suburban neighborhood of Chicago with spacious homes. Development in the early twentieth century made the neighborhood denser, and while it was still a wealthy neighborhood by 1930, it featured many apartment buildings as well. The district's houses reflect Chicago's architectural development at the turn of the century; while its nineteenth-century homes have Queen Anne and Romanesque Revival designs, its twentieth-century houses exhibit newly popular styles such as the Prairie School and Classical Revival. The district's apartment buildings were designed in part to match the character of its houses, as doing so portrayed a sense of luxury and domesticity to its affluent residents; as a result, they largely used the same styles as the twentieth-century homes and often included courtyards to replace lawns.

The district was added to the National Register of Historic Places on July 13, 1984.
