= Lawrence Avenue Historic District =

Historic district in Massachusetts, United States

- U.S. National Register of Historic Places
- U.S. Historic district
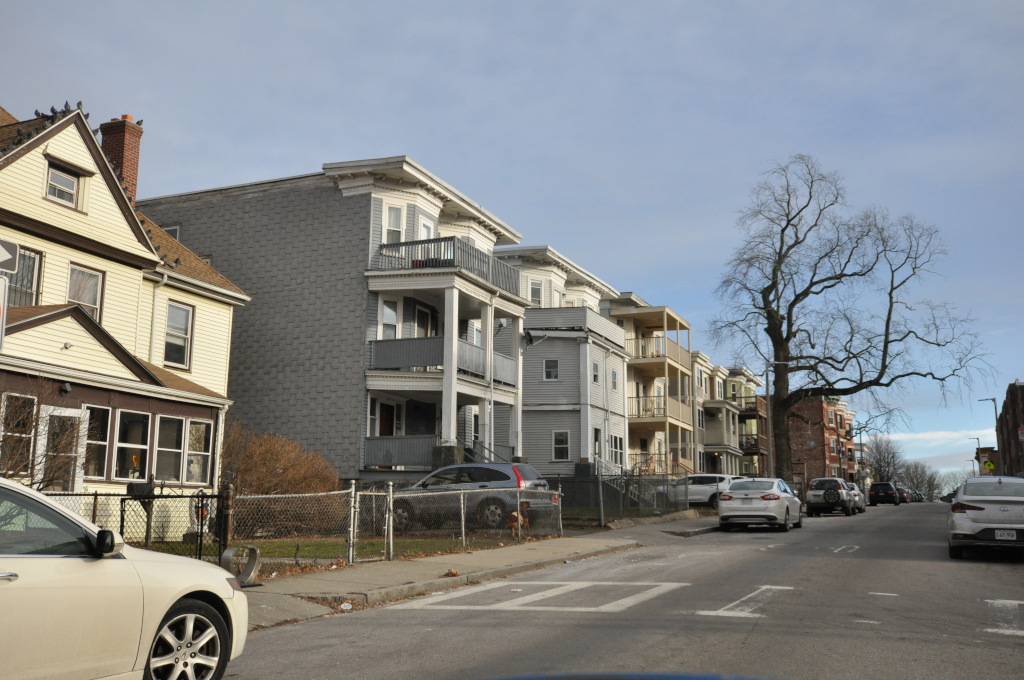

- Location within Massachusetts Location within the United States
- Location: Blue Hill Avenue, Lawrence Avenue, Coleus Park, Magnolia Street, and Intervale Street, Boston
- Coordinates: 42°18′43″N 71°4′37″W
- Area: 14.6 acres (5.9 ha)
- Built: 1885-1920
- Architect: Multiple
- Architectural style: Queen Anne; Classical Revival; Colonial Revival
- NRHP reference No.: 100006127
- Added to NRHP: February 11, 2021

The Lawrence Avenue Historic District is a historic district encompassing a small residential area in the Dorchester neighborhood of Boston, Massachusetts. Centered on Lawrence Avenue, the area was developed in the late 19th and early 20th century during a major Jewish migration, and includes a fine sample of Colonial Revival and Queen Anne architecture. The district was listed on the National Register of Historic Places in 2021.

== Description and history ==
Lawrence Avenue is located in the central Dorchester area known as Grove Hall, extending roughly southeastward from Blue Hill Avenue to Magnolia Street, separated from Columbia Road by Ceylon Park. It is lined mainly with residential construction, but also includes the Art Deco Martin Luther King Jr. School, built in the 1930s. The residential construction is mixed, with brick and stone apartment blocks, as well as single and multi-unit wood-frame construction.

Prior to its late-19th century development, the Grove Hall area consisted primarily of the country estates of wealthy families. With the advent of streetcars, the estates were sold off and subject to more dense residential construction. Lawrence Avenue was subdivided around 1885, and was developed primarily by father-and-son developers, both named William Phipps. Early development consisted mainly of single-family properties, some designed by architect John Roulstone Hall, hired by the elder Phipps. In the 1910s the area began to see an influx of Jewish migration from other parts of the city and Chelsea, resulting in the construction of many of the area's apartment blocks. The area became the subject of several projects in the 1960s and 1970s to increase the city's stock of low-to-middle income housing.

== See also ==
- National Register of Historic Places listings in southern Boston, Massachusetts
