= Lawrence Avenue (Chicago) =

Street in Chicago

- 4800 North
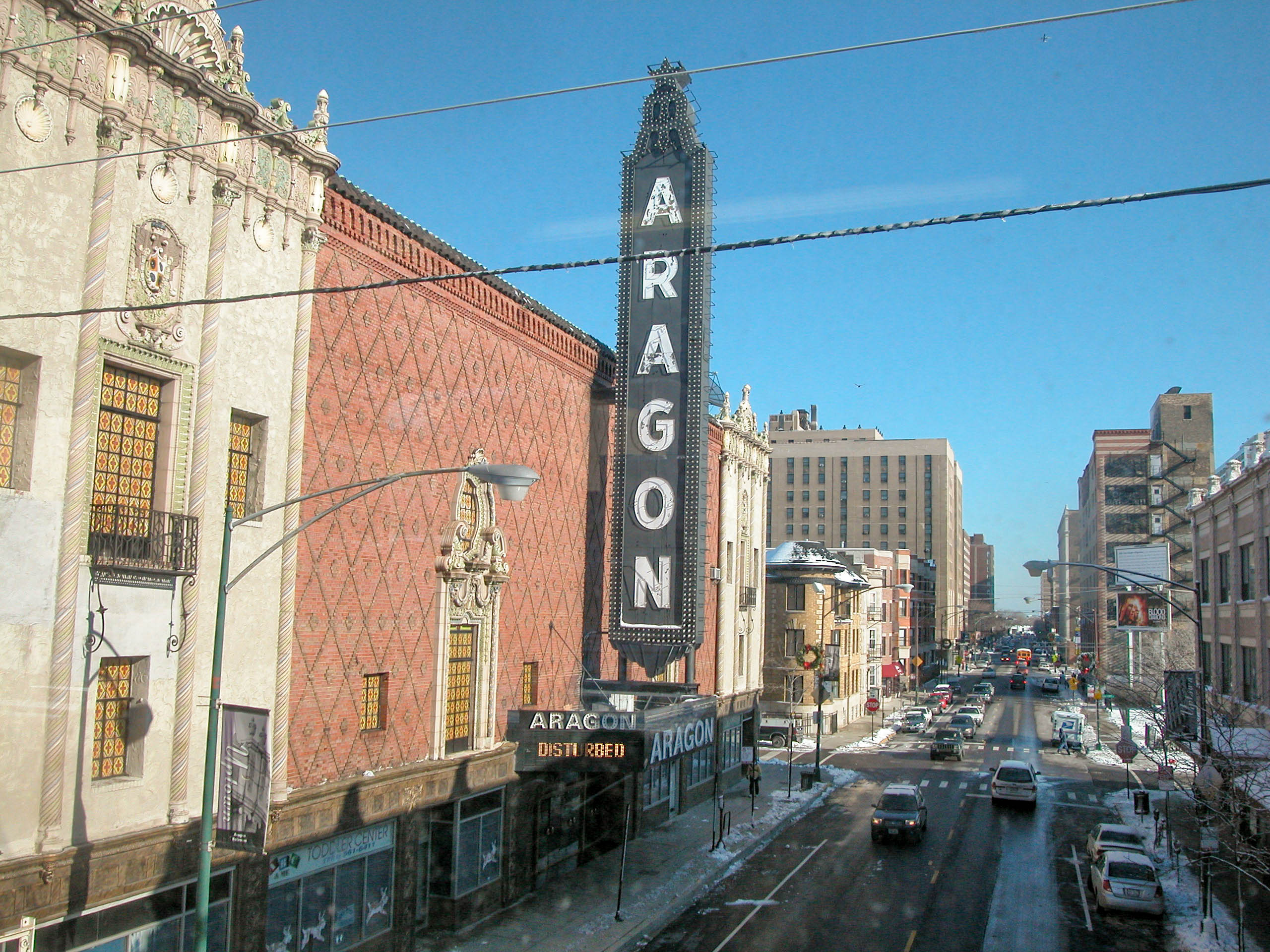
- Overlook of Lawrence Avenue facing west, with the Aragon Ballroom in view. Taken from Lawrence Red Line. (2006)
- Location: Schiller Park, Norridge, Harwood Heights, Chicago
- West end: Mannheim Road in Schiller Park
- East end: Simmons Drive in Chicago at about 600 W after intersecting with Wilson Avenue

Lawrence Avenue is a major east–west street in the Chicago metropolitan area. Located 6 miles (9.7 km) north of Madison Street, it is designated 4800N in Chicago's grid system. Served by multiple rail connections throughout its length, Lawrence Avenue has throughout Chicago's history, been known to be a major commercial and cultural thoroughfare, alongside nearby Broadway, serving as the hub for the Uptown Square Historic District, with multiple theaters, restaurants, nightclubs, hotels, and other small businesses found along the street. Lawrence is also home to a variety of ethnic diasporas, with Polish, Lithuanian, Jewish, Cambodian, Ukrainian, Mexican, Guatemalan, Ecuadorean, Punjabi, and Korean groups among others all calling the street home. Lawrence Avenue forms part of the southern boundary for the Jefferson Park, Forest Glen, and Albany Park community areas, as well as being a major commercial road for all those areas in addition to Lincoln Square and Uptown.

== Route description ==
Lawrence Avenue begins at an intersection between Wilson Avenue (4600 North) and Simmons Drive, before curving northwards until it crosses Lake Shore Drive; whereupon it continues westward to Narrangansett Avenue (6400 West) and picks up again west of Harlem Avenue (7200 West), where it serves as a major arterial road for the village of Norridge, and crosses Robinson Woods, until its termination at Mannheim Road, on the eastern border of O'Hare Airport. Between Kedzie and Pulaski Road, Lawrence is also nicknamed "Seoul Drive" due to the high concentration of Korean immigrants and businesses in the area, with the street serving as Chicago's own Koreatown.

== History ==
Lawrence Avenue, named after a friend of local developer Lazarus Silverman, Bradford A. Lawrence, part of Silverman's planned Montrose subdivision, was a relatively unassuming street for much of its early history. That is until the Northwestern Elevated Railroad extended its Ravenswood Branch to Kimball and Lawrence in 1907, which provided the fledgling community with an influx of new residents and businesses, the effects of which are still felt to this day.

== Transportation ==
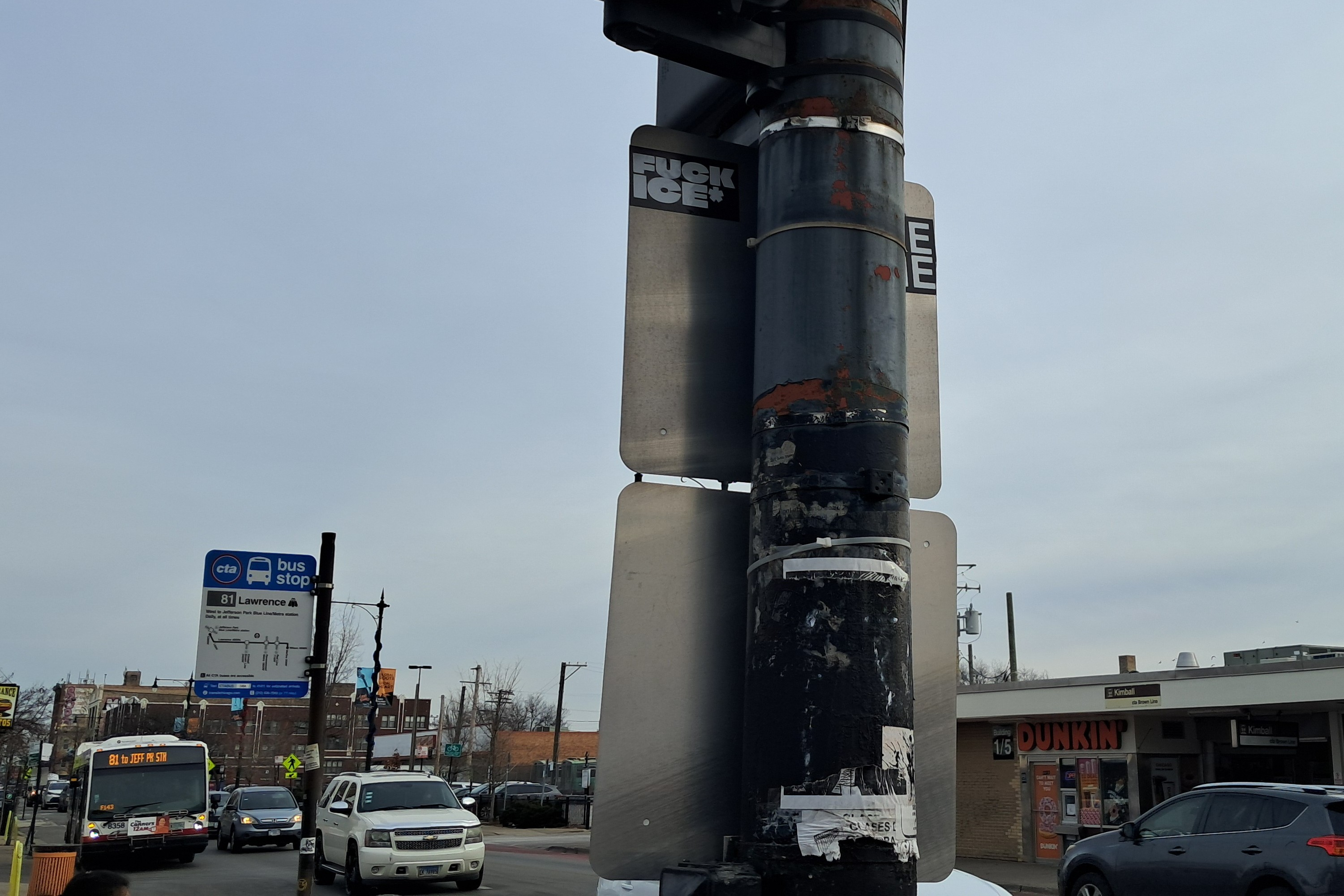
CTA route 81 bus across the entrance of Kimball station

Lawrence Avenue is serviced by two Chicago Transit Authority (CTA) rail lines; those being Lawrence station on the CTA's Red Line and Kimball station on the CTA's Brown Line. Kimball serves as the terminal for the Brown Line, and its corresponding rail yard, Kimball Yard is also located on Lawrence. Chicago's Metra commuter rail service also serves Lawrence via Ravenswood station on Metra's Union Pacific North Line.

The CTA also provides two buses for Lawrence; the first being the 81 Lawrence bus on the street, which runs from Wilson Avenue and Marine Drive, north to Lawrence, and then down Lawrence until it reaches Lipps Avenue and then heads north until it reaches the Jefferson Park Transit Center. The second route would be the 81W West Lawrence bus, which continues westward from where route 81 ends, traveling from the Jefferson Park Transit Center down Milwaukee Avenue until Lawrence, then further down Lawrence until Austin Avenue, where it turns north one block to Gunnison Street where it continues until Harlem Avenue in Harwood Heights, traveling one block south to reconnect to Lawrence westbound to East River Road, then traveling north on East River until an apartment complex's parking lot, passing northeast through said parking lot, then north on Delphia Avenue, east on Bryn Mawr Avenue, north on Cumberland Avenue, before finally reaching the Cumberland Blue Line station, where the route ends.
