= Aragon Ballroom (Chicago) =

Historic arena opened 1926

Coordinates: 41°58′10.03″N 87°39′29.28″W

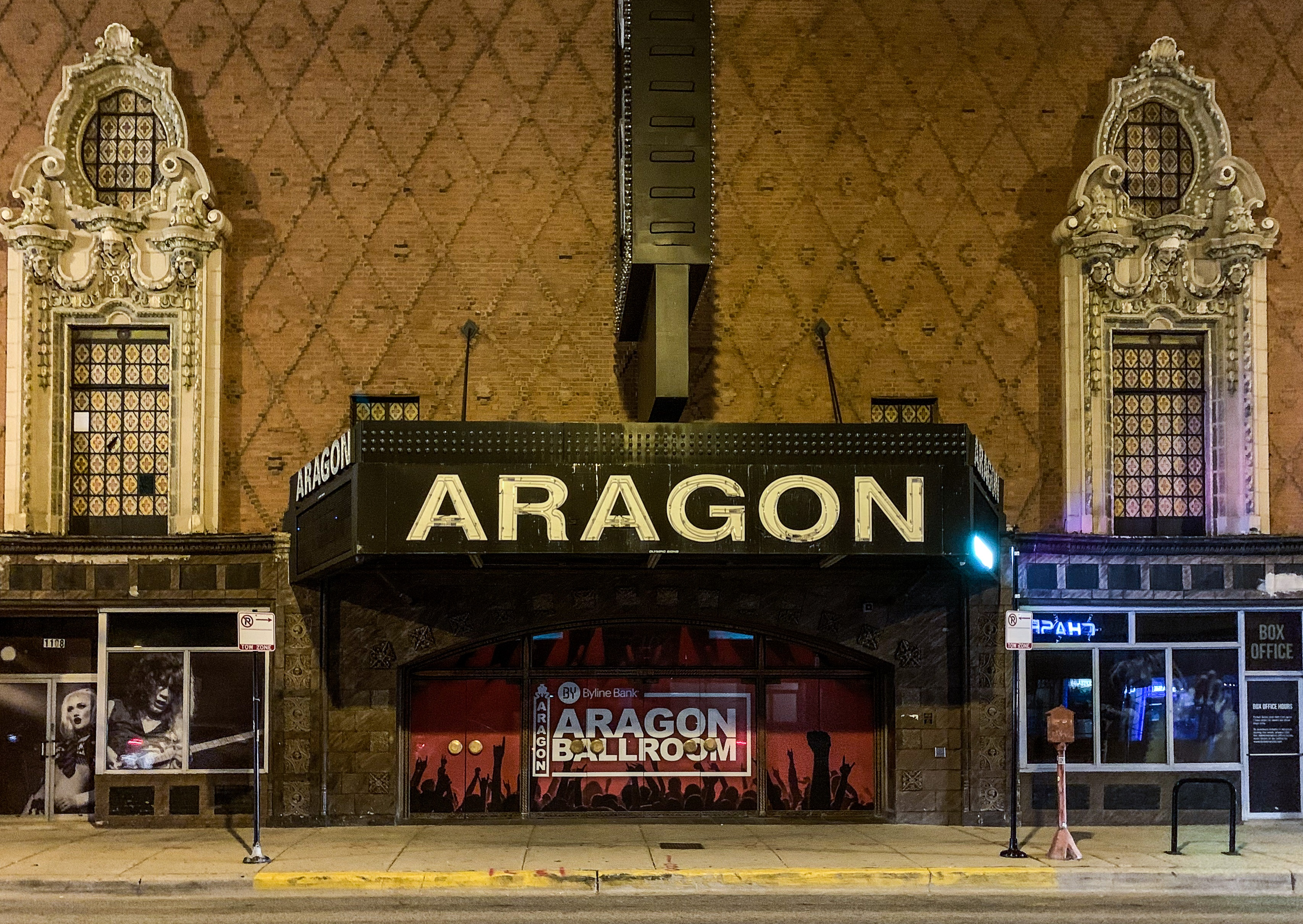
- Facade in 2019
- Interactive map of Aragon Ballroom
- Former names: Aragon Ballroom (1926-66; 1968-2014); Cheetah Club (1966-68); Aragon Entertainment Center (2014-19); Byline Bank Aragon (2019-present)
- Address: 1106 W Lawrence Avenue
- Location: Chicago, Illinois, U.S.
- Owner: Live Nation (2017-present)
- Operator: Live Nation
- Capacity: 5,000

Construction
- Opened: July 15, 1926
- Cost: $2 million ($36.7 million in 2025 dollars)
- Architects: Ralph D. Huszagh; Boyd Hill; John Eberson
- Builders: Plotke & Grosby

Website
- bylinebankaragonballroom.com

The Aragon Ballroom is a ballroom turned event space located in Chicago in the Uptown neighborhood, approximately 5 miles (8 km) north of Downtown.

== History ==
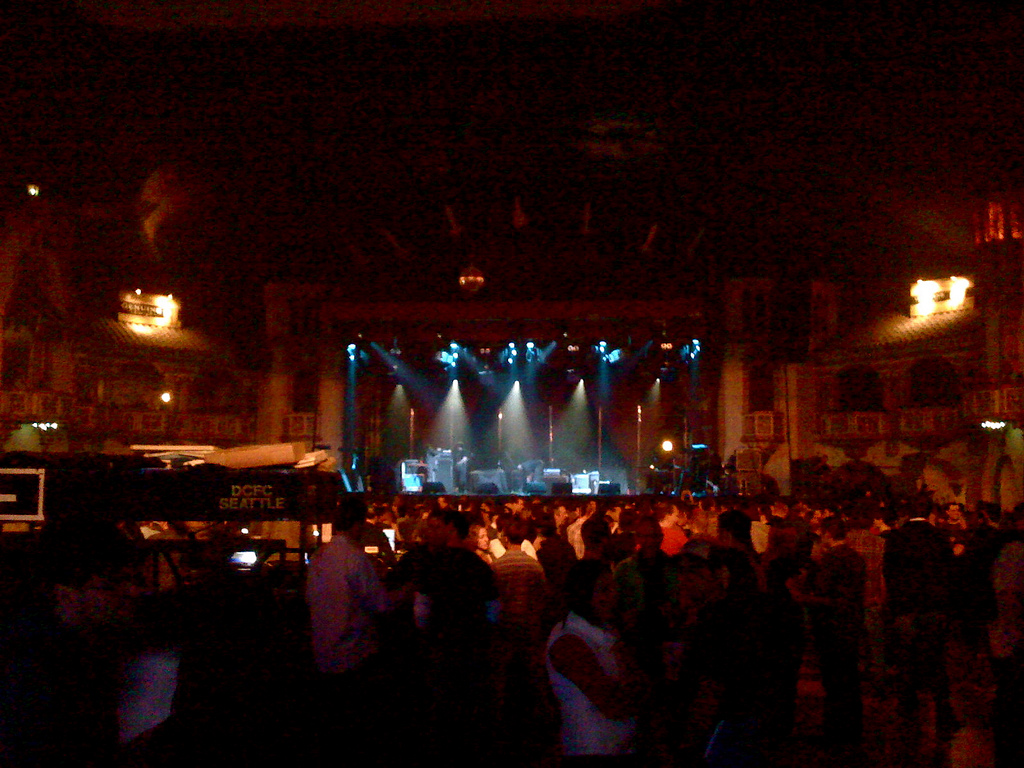
Ballroom interior in 2009

The Aragon Ballroom was built by brothers Andrew and William Karzas, who turned to ballrooms after making their early fortunes in nickelodeons and movie theaters. Their first dance hall project was the 1922 Trianon Ballroom in Chicago designed by renowned theater architects Rapp & Rapp. With hopes of duplicating the success of the Trianon, the brothers opened the Aragon on July 15, 1926, once again turning to movie theater experts for building design. Architects Huszagh & Hill designed the Aragon’s stucco exterior in Spanish Baroque style while movie palace designer John Eberson decorated the interior to resemble the courtyard of a Moorish castle surrounding a 21,000 square-foot dance floor.

Named for a region of Spain, the Aragon was an immediate success and has remained a popular Chicago music attraction for many decades. The Aragon's proximity to the Chicago 'L' train provided patrons with easy access, and often crowds in excess of 18,000 would attend during each six-day business week. Each night, powerhouse radio station WGN broadcast an hour-long program from the hall to audiences throughout the United States and Canada. Some reports indicate the broadcast was heard overseas in Britain.

According to legend, the secret tunnels under the nearby Green Mill bar, a Prohibition-era hangout of Al Capone, led to the Aragon's basement.

A fire at an adjacent cocktail lounge in 1958 forced the Aragon to close for several months. After the reopening, crowds declined significantly, to the point that regular dancing ended in 1964. A succession of new owners used the Aragon as a roller skating rink, a boxing venue, and a discothèque, among other uses. There were also occasional efforts to revive it as a traditional ballroom.

The Aragon hosted nearly all of the top names of the big band era. Shows were radio broadcast nationally and even heard in Europe. During the 1970s, the Aragon was home to "monster rock" shows which were marathons of rock music acts often lasting six hours or more.

In 1973, Latin promoters Willy Miranda and Jose Palomar, who had promoted Hispanic dances and concerts in Chicago for years, became owners of the Aragon. They soon teamed up with rock promoters Arny Granat and Jerry Mickelson (owners of Chicago-based Jam Productions, which by 2017 claimed to be the "largest independent producer of live entertainment in the United States"), who used the hall for their rock concerts.

World championship boxing made its way to the Aragon Ballroom on December 15, 1982, when the World Boxing Association's world Cruiserweight champion, Puerto Rican Ossie Ocasio, successfully defended his title by beating challenger Eddie Taylor by a 15 rounds decision.

In the late 1990s, Luis Rossi (former owner of La Raza newspaper), Ivan Fernandez, and Mercedes Fernandez purchased the Aragon. In September 2014, Mercedes Fernandez sold all her interests in the Aragon. Under the name "Aragon Entertainment Center", the hall continued to host a variety of Spanish language and Vietnamese language shows as well as English language rock concerts. It still hosts occasional boxing events.

In 2015, the theatre was used in the filming of Zack Snyder's Batman v Superman: Dawn of Justice, doubling as the theatre where Thomas (Jeffrey Dean Morgan) and Martha Wayne (Lauren Cohan) get shot. The sign for the venue and the marquee was temporarily reconstructed, and removed once the filming had been completed.

As of late 2017, Live Nation owns the Aragon Ballroom, and produces a variety of English language and Spanish language pop and rock concerts there.

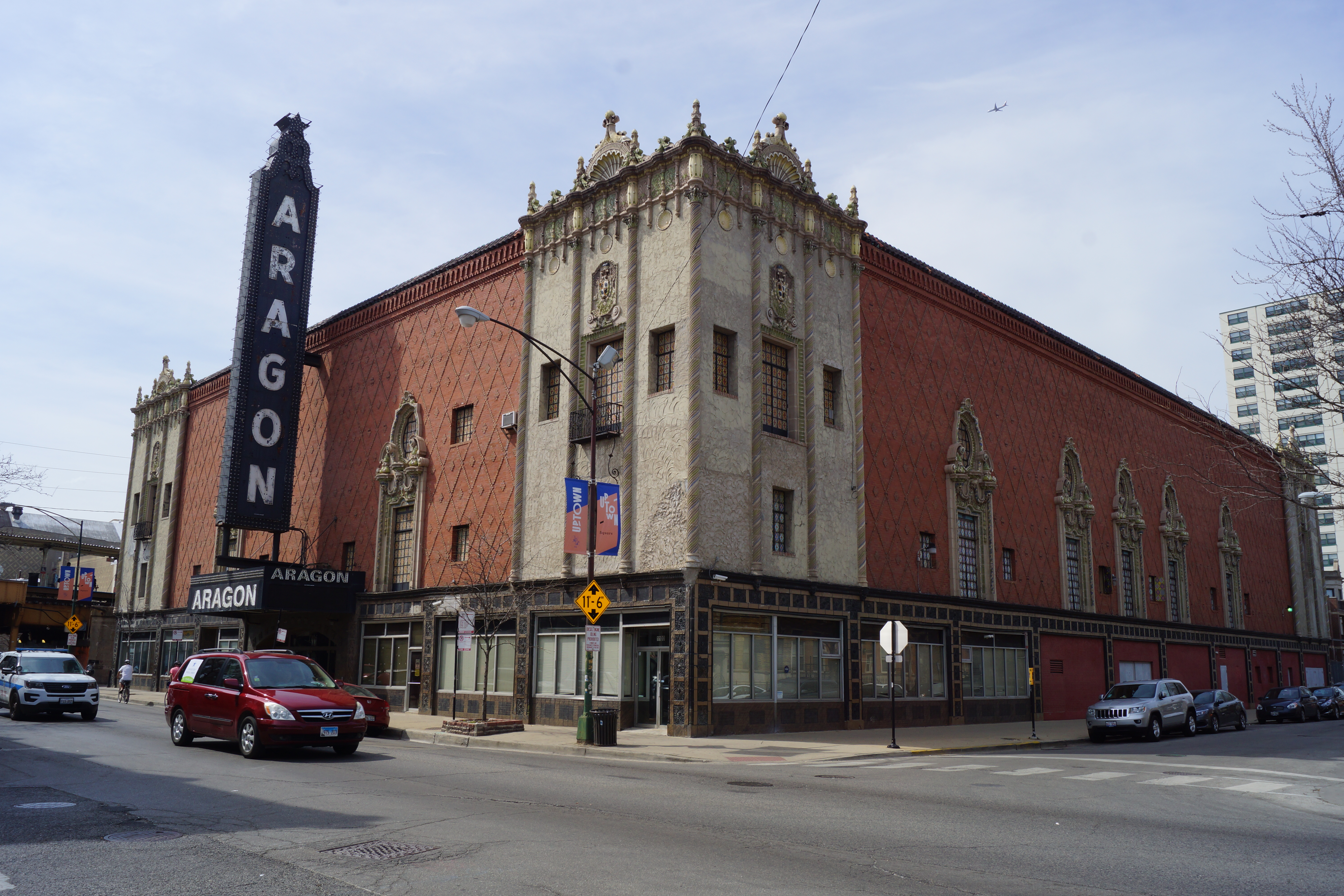
Exterior of venue (c.2018)

Between July 16 and 31, 2025, professional wrestling promotion All Elite Wrestling set up residency and ran a series of episodes of its television shows, Dynamite and Collision from the venue.

In the 1961 Twilight Zone episode "Static", an uncredited Bob Crane is a old-time radio DJ who can be heard saying "Now, from the Aragon Ballroom in Chicago ... Tommy Dorsey & his band!".

== Live music recordings ==
- On April 19, 1975, electronic band Kraftwerk played at the Aragon Ballroom to an audience of 3000 spectators.
- In March 1978, classic rock band Aerosmith played at the Aragon Ballroom, later releasing the recordings of "Sweet Emotion" and "Lord of the Thighs" on their 1978 Live! Bootleg album.
- The 2009 Deluxe Edition of R.E.M.'s Reckoning album includes a live concert taped at the Aragon Ballroom on July 7, 1984, and broadcast on WXRT in Chicago. The opening act was the California band The Dream Syndicate.
- On May 25, 1986, thrash metal band Metallica played here for their Damage, Inc. Tour. They used the live recording in the 2017 remaster box set of their 1986 studio album Master of Puppets.
- On October 23 and 25, 1993, grunge band Nirvana played at the Aragon for their final two shows in Chicago. During the show on the 23rd the band played the song "You Know You're Right" for the first and only time live. A recording of the song from this show was bootlegged for nine years until they decided to release the studio version on October 8, 2002, as part of the greatest hits album Nirvana.
- On November 18, 1994, punk rock band Green Day's performance to a sold-out crowd at the Aragon was recorded for MTV as "MTV Jaded in Chicago".
- On August 22, 1995, a Soul Asylum concert was recorded at the Aragon for the Album Network and two songs were released on the "Promises Broken" CD single.
- On June 26, 2004, funk metal band Primus filmed their first concert DVD, Hallucino-Genetics, at the Aragon.
- During a performance on October 17, 2009, sludge metal band Mastodon recorded a live album and concert DVD at the venue. Live at the Aragon was released on March 15, 2011.
- In June 2013, Third Man Records released a live album of The White Stripes' performance at the venue from July 2, 2003, as part of their From the Vault series.

== See also ==
- House of Blues
