= Broadway (Chicago) =

Major street in Chicago, Illinois, USA

- 1200 West (from Lawrence to Devon)
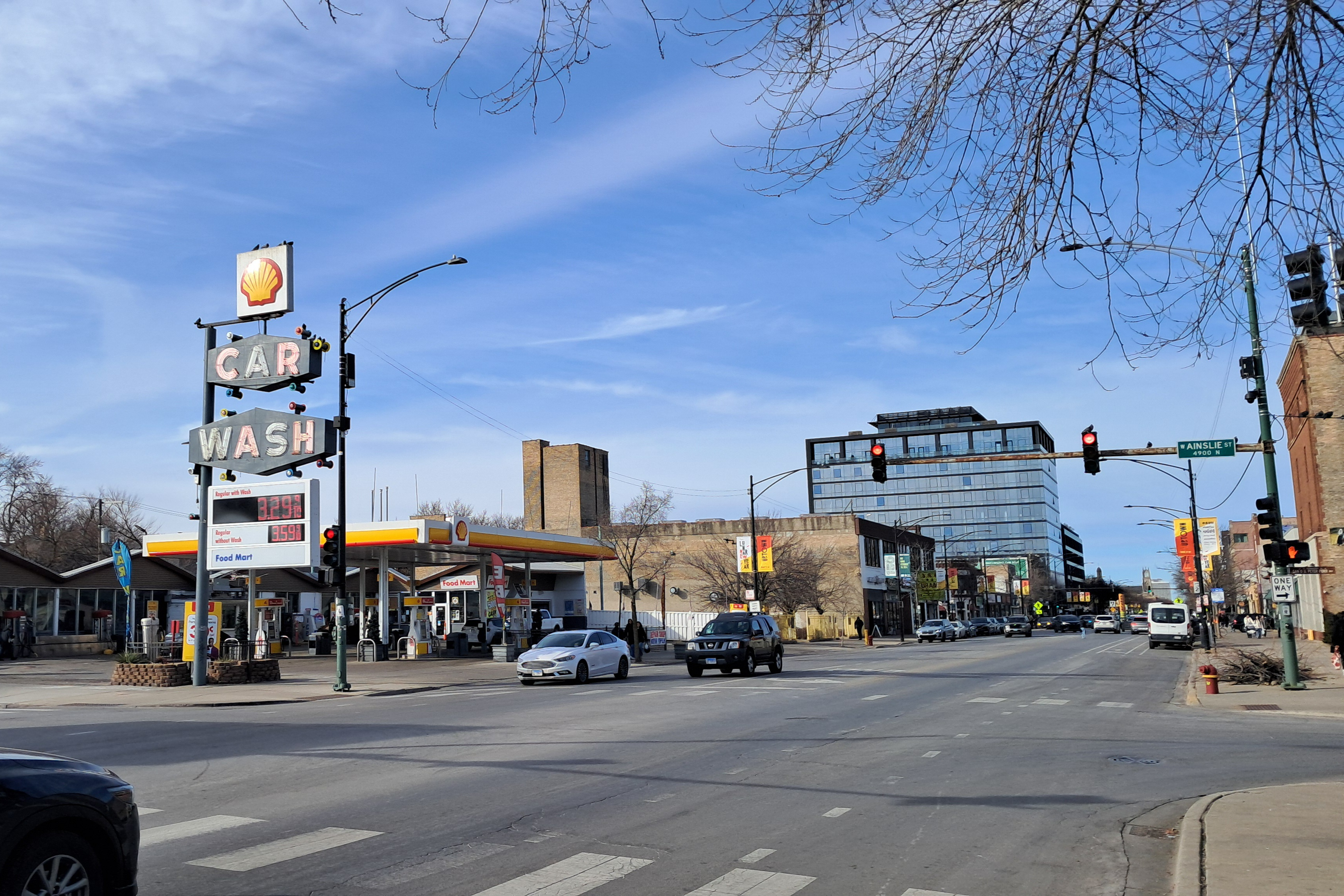
- Broadway at Ainslie Street
- Part of: US 14
- Length: 4.7 mi (7.6 km)
- South end: Diversey Parkway (2800 North)
- North end: Devon Avenue (6400 North)

Broadway is a major street in Chicago's Lake View, Uptown, and Edgewater community areas on the city's North Side, running from Diversey Parkway (2800 North) to Devon Avenue (6400 North). Originally called Evanston Avenue, the name of the street was changed to Broadway on August 15, 1913, as part of 467 road name changes enacted on that date. The new name was taken from New York City's famous theater district.

The street runs at a mostly southeast-to-northwest diagonal direction between Diversey Parkway and Lawrence Avenue (4800 North). Between Lawrence Avenue and Devon Avenue, Broadway runs in a north-to-south direction and becomes 1200 West in place of Racine Avenue. Broadway carries U.S. Route 14 from its terminus at Foster Avenue to the intersection of Ridge and Bryn Mawr Avenues. Broadway is the only street in the city of Chicago that does not have a suffix. It is not a Street, Avenue, Road, Boulevard nor Parkway; it is known simply as Broadway.

== Transportation ==
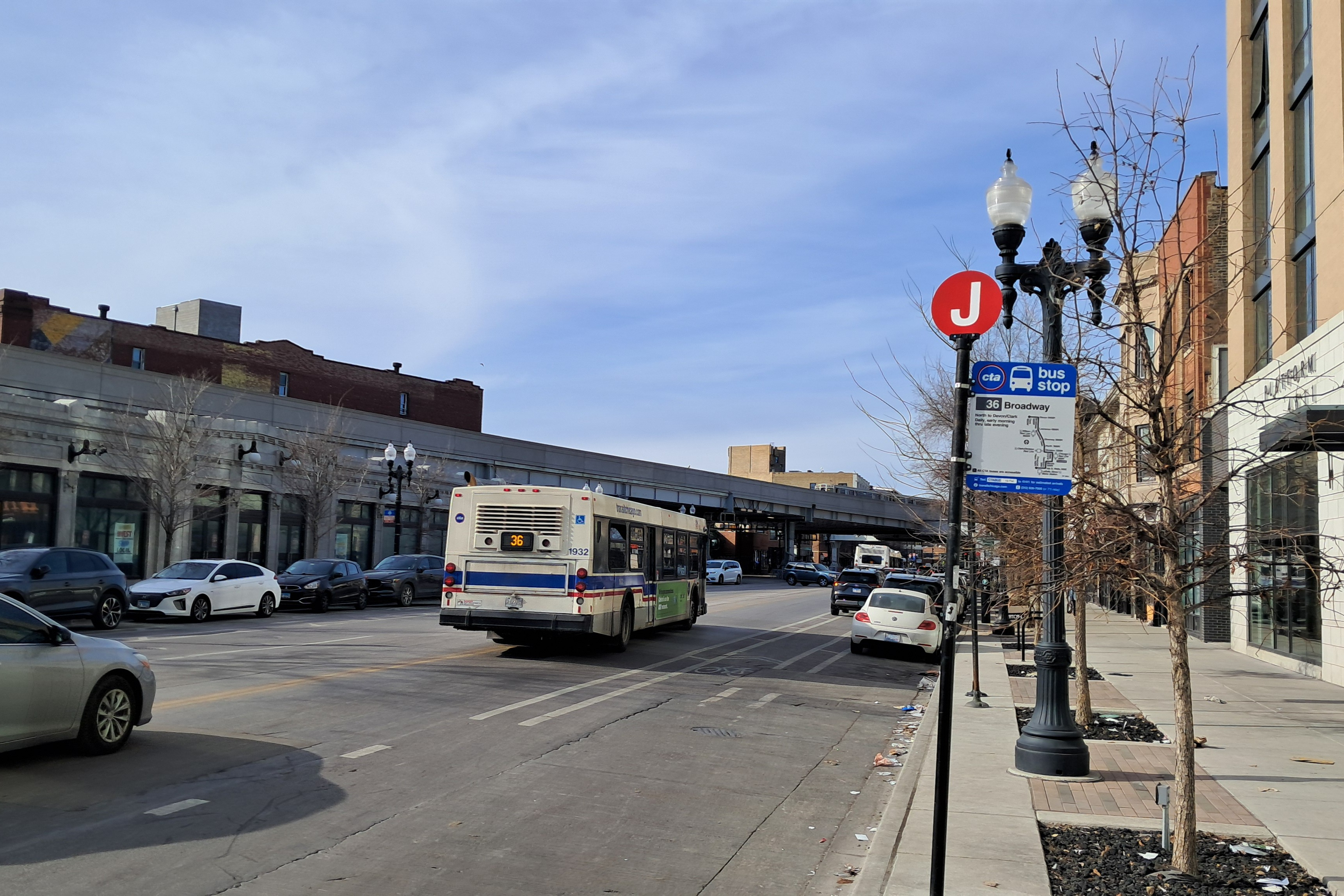
CTA route 36 bus approaching the "L" structure north of Wilson station

Broadway is entirely served by the CTA bus route 36 Broadway, which travels from a bus turnaround north of Clark Street/Devon Avenue to LaSalle Street Station. Outside of Broadway, the route also travels along Devon Avenue, Clark Street, State Street, and Dearborn Street (northbound only).

Between its northern terminus and Wilson station, Broadway parallels the North Side main line (Red Line and Purple Line Express).

== Major intersections ==
The entire route is in Chicago, Cook County.

mi	km	Destinations	Notes
0.0	0.0	North Clark Street / West Diversey Parkway	Southern terminus
1.6	2.6	IL 19 (West Irving Park Road)	
3.2	5.1	US 14 begins / US 41 (West Foster Avenue)	Southern end of US 14 concurrency; eastern terminus of US 14
3.7	6.0	US 14 west (North Ridge Avenue) / West Bryn Mawr Avenue	Northern end of US 14 concurrency
4.7	7.6	West Devon Avenue / West Sheridan Road	Northern terminus; roadway continues as North Sheridan Road.
1.000 mi = 1.609 km; 1.000 km = 0.621 mi: Concurrency terminus
