= Vautravers Building =

Apartment building in Chicago, Illinois

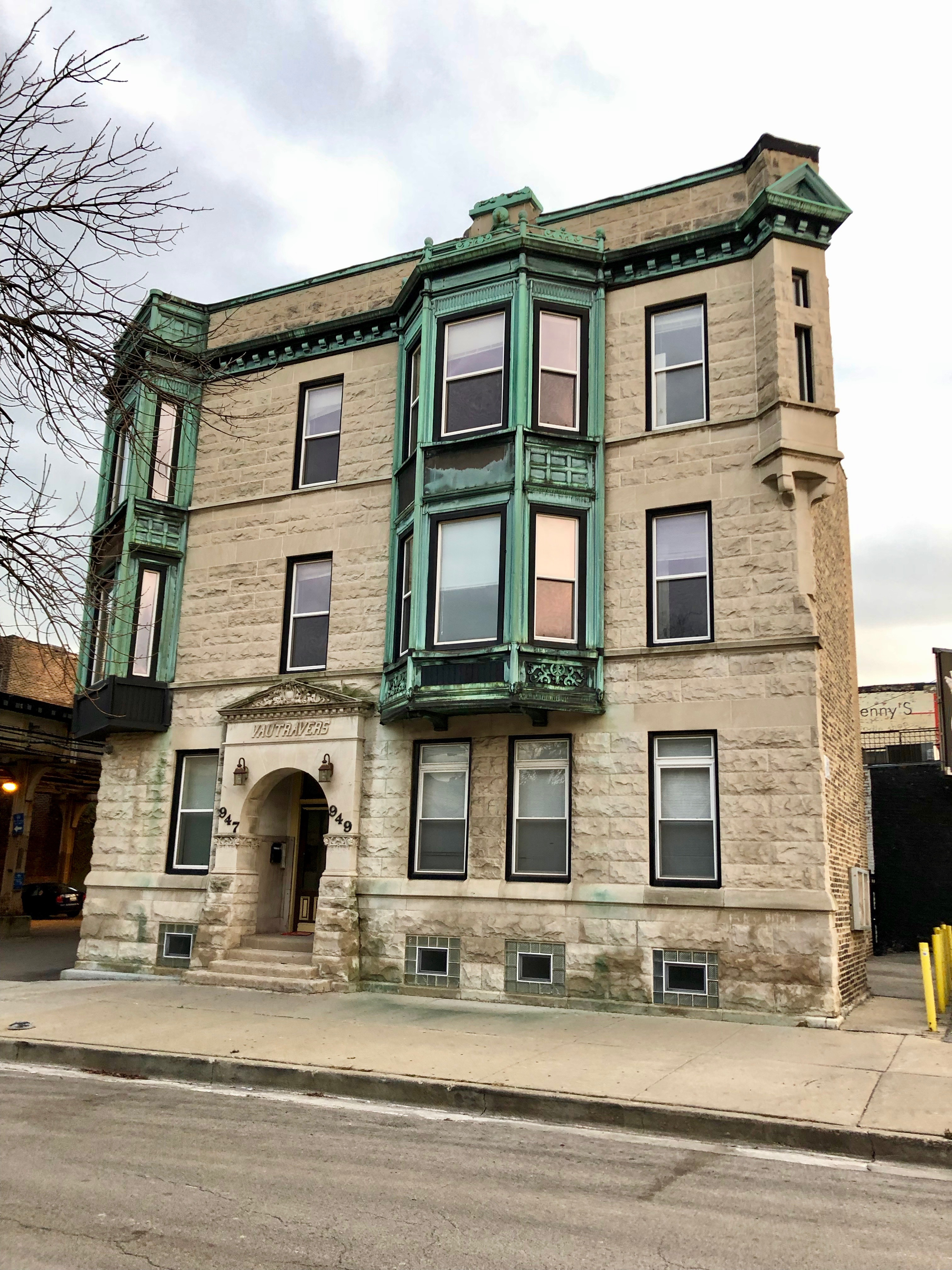
- Vautravers Building prior to relocation
- Interactive map of the Vautravers Building area

General information
- Architectural style: Greystone
- Location: Chicago, Illinois, U.S., 947–949 West Newport Avenue
- Coordinates: 41.9443°N 87.6537°W

Technical details
- Floor count: 3

The Vautravers Building is a historic apartment building at 947 West Newport Avenue in the Lake View neighborhood of Chicago. It was relocated in 2021 to preserve it as part of the reconstruction of the CTA Red Line elevated rail structure.

Constructed in 1894, the building's original owners refused to sell when the Northwestern Elevated Railroad was constructed, forcing the tracks to be curved to avoid the building. When the CTA was preparing to modernize the tracks (now carrying the CTA's Red and Purple lines) in 2021, the building was moved approximately 30 feet (9 m) to allow the tight curves to be straightened.

Fourteen other buildings in the area were demolished as part of the rail improvements, with the Vautravers Building being the only structure to be preserved by relocation.
