= Lakeview Historic District (Chicago) =

Historic district in Illinois, United States

- U.S. National Register of Historic Places
- U.S. Historic district
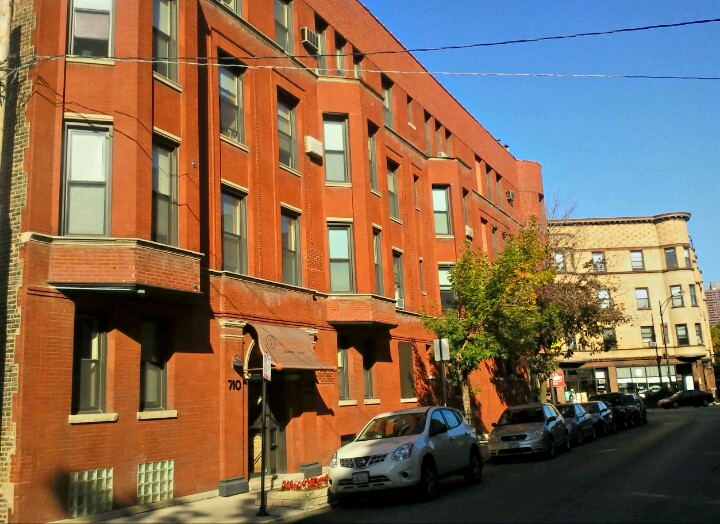
- 710 W Oakdale Ave

- Location within Illinois
- Location: Roughly bounded by W. Wrightwood Avenue, N. Lakeview Avenue, N. Sheridan Road, W. Belmont Avenue, N. Halsted Street, W. Wellington Avenue, N. Racine Avenue, and W. George Street; also comprising 701, 705, 711, 715-717, 721, 733-735, 737, and 739 Belmont Avenue, 3162 and 3164 N. Orchard Street, and 3171 N. Halsted Street
- Coordinates: 41°56′06″N 87°38′56″W
- NRHP reference No.: 77000478; 86001042
- Added to NRHP: September 15, 1977, increased May 16, 1986

The Lakeview Historic District is a historic district on the north side of the city of Chicago, Illinois.

The district was listed on the U.S. National Register of Historic Places on September 15, 1977. The district, which is in southeastern Lakeview Township about 3.5 miles (5.6 km) north of the Chicago Loop, is primarily in the Lake View community but also includes a small part of the Lincoln Park neighborhood to the south. A boundary expansion on May 16, 1986, added a one-block section on the south side of Belmont Avenue, between Orchard and Halsted Streets.

Land use in the historic district is primarily multi-family residential. Streets are laid out on a rectangular grid that is broken by the short jogs in some of the streets and crossed on the diagonal by Clark Street. The district reached residential maturity during the 1890s.

Lakeview Historic District
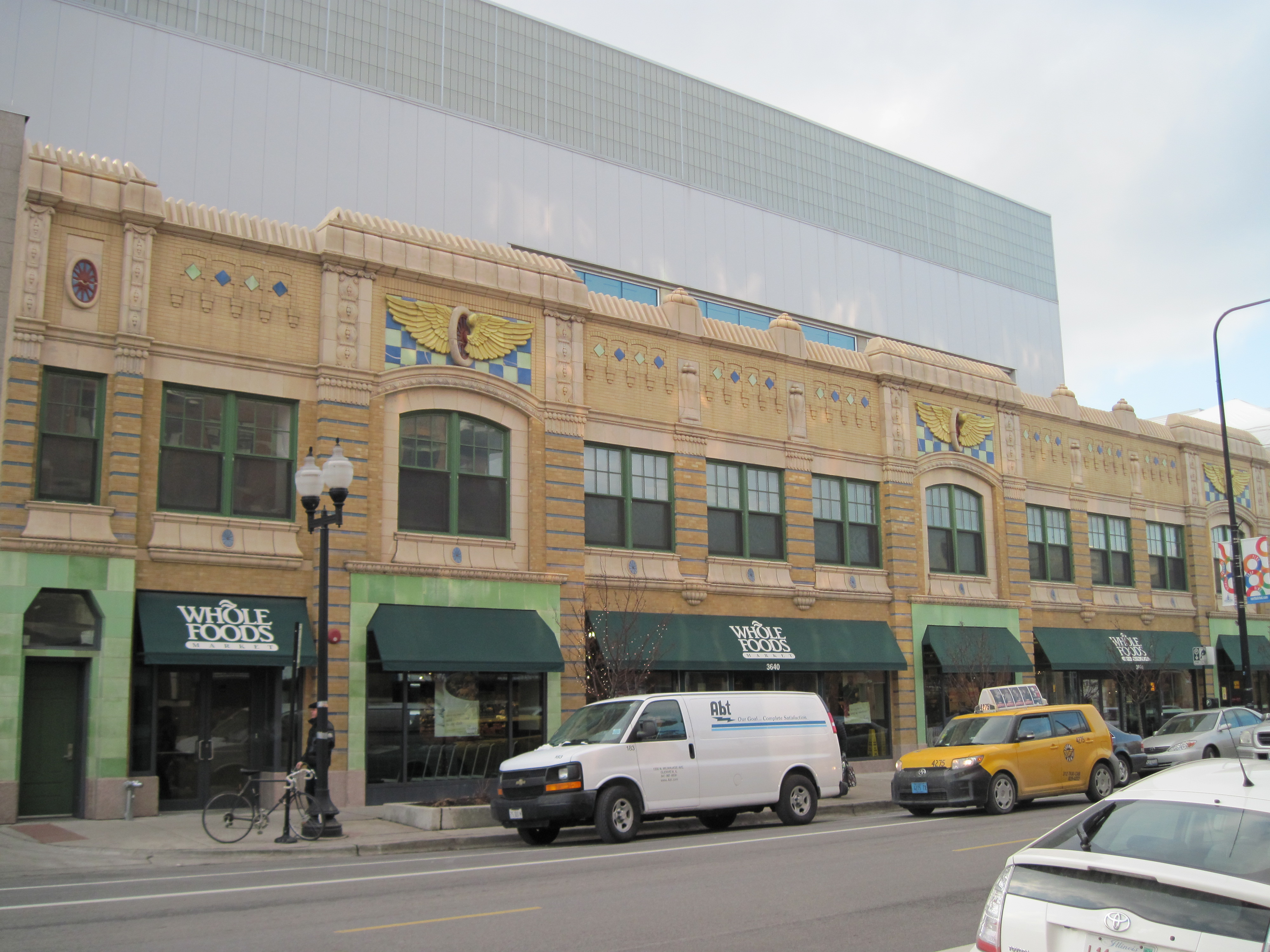
3640 N. Halsted Street

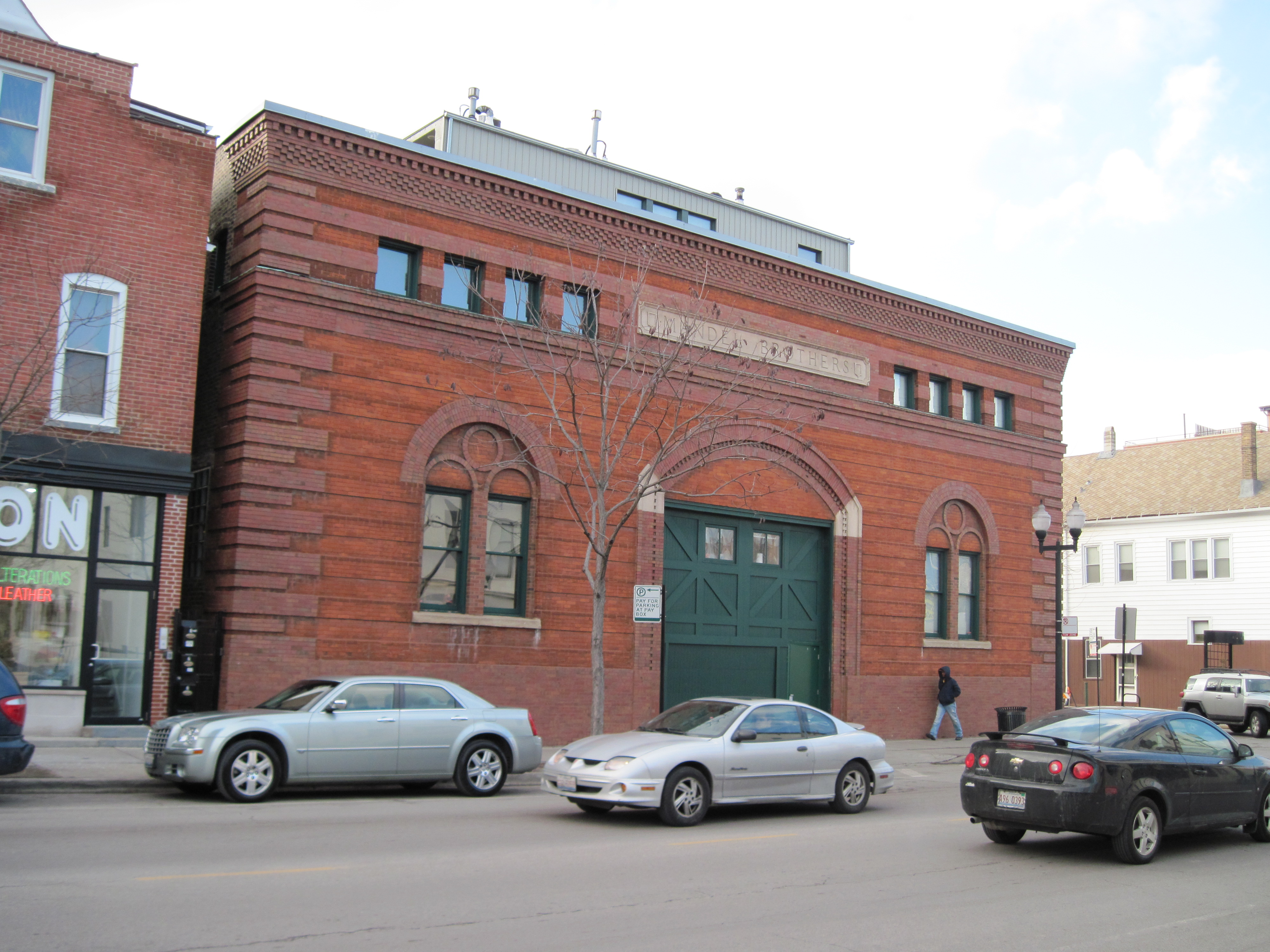
Mandel Brothers Warehouse Building

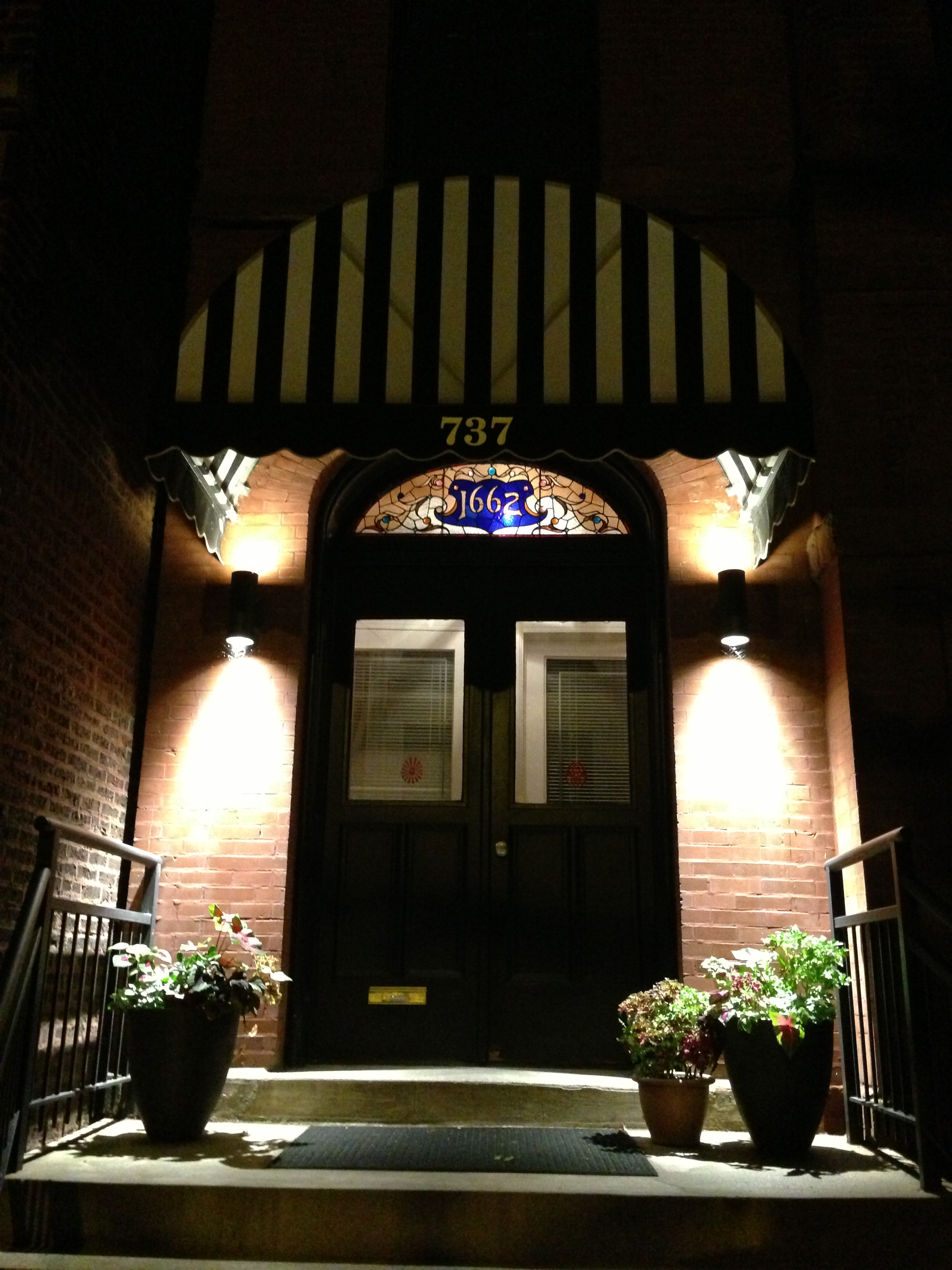
Entrance to 737 W. Belmont Avenue
