= 42nd Precinct / Town Hall Police Station =

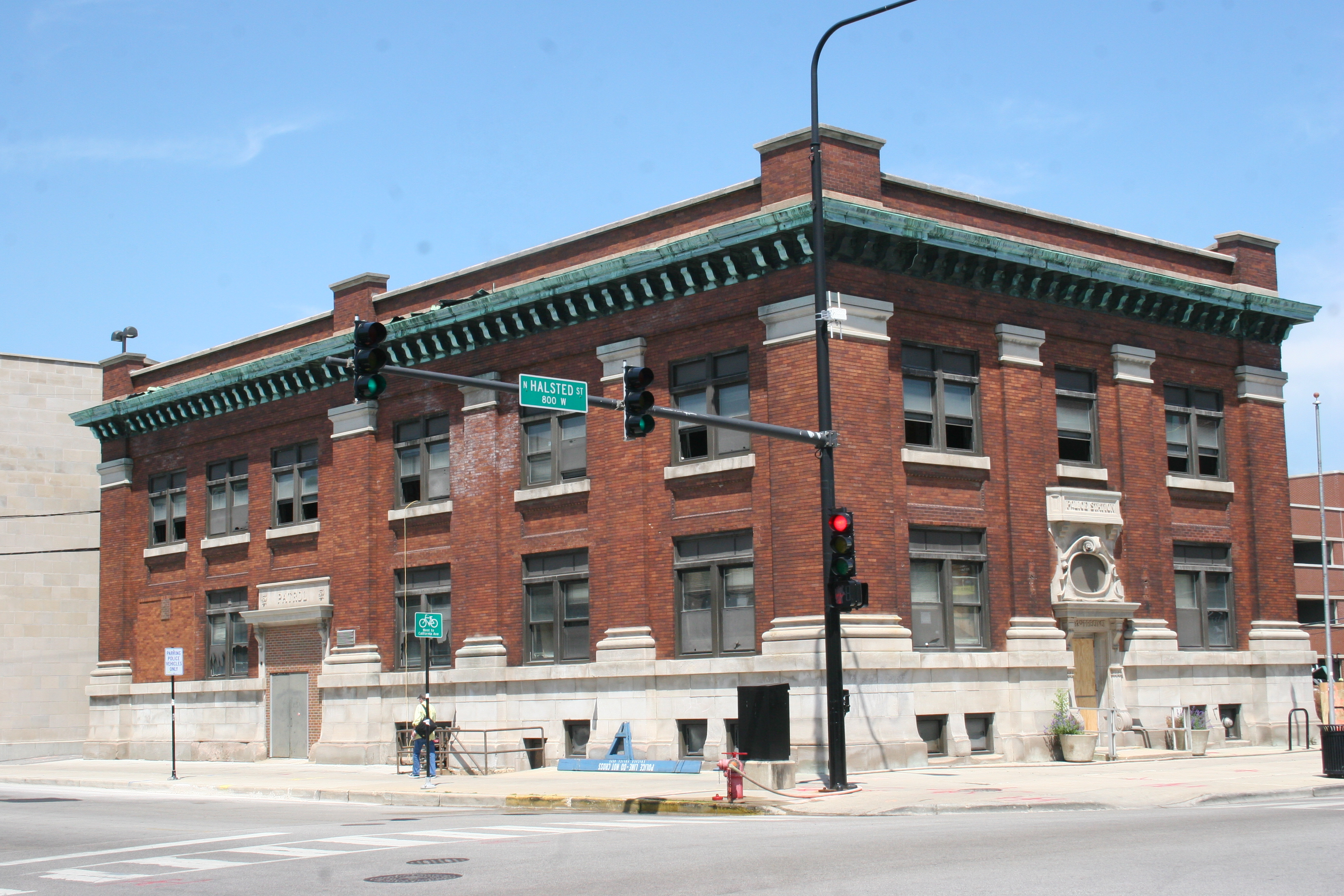
- Building from the South West corner

- Location within Chicago 42nd Precinct / Town Hall Police Station (Illinois) 42nd Precinct / Town Hall Police Station (the United States)

General information
- Architectural style: Revivalism, neoclassical
- Location: Lake View, Chicago, Illinois, United States
- Coordinates: 41°56′51″N 87°39′00″W
- Current tenants: Chicago Police Department
- Construction started: 1906
- Completed: 1907
- Cost: $35,000 Estimated
- Owner: Chicago Police Department

Technical details
- Floor count: 2

The 42nd Precinct / Town Hall Police Station, located in Chicago's Lake View community area, is one of the oldest and most architecturally significant extant historic police station buildings in Chicago. It was constructed in 1907 on the site of Lake View Township's Town Hall and subsequently has been commonly referred to as the "Old Town Hall". Only three older police station buildings are extant in Chicago.

The 42nd Precinct / Old Town Hall Police Station also is significant as a finely-designed Classical Revival-style police station. Distinguished by its symmetrical façade arrangement, classicly-inspired ornament, and distinctive copper cornice, this well-preserved police station exemplifies the influence of Classicism on the architecture of government and public buildings in Chicago in the early twentieth century.

== Early history ==
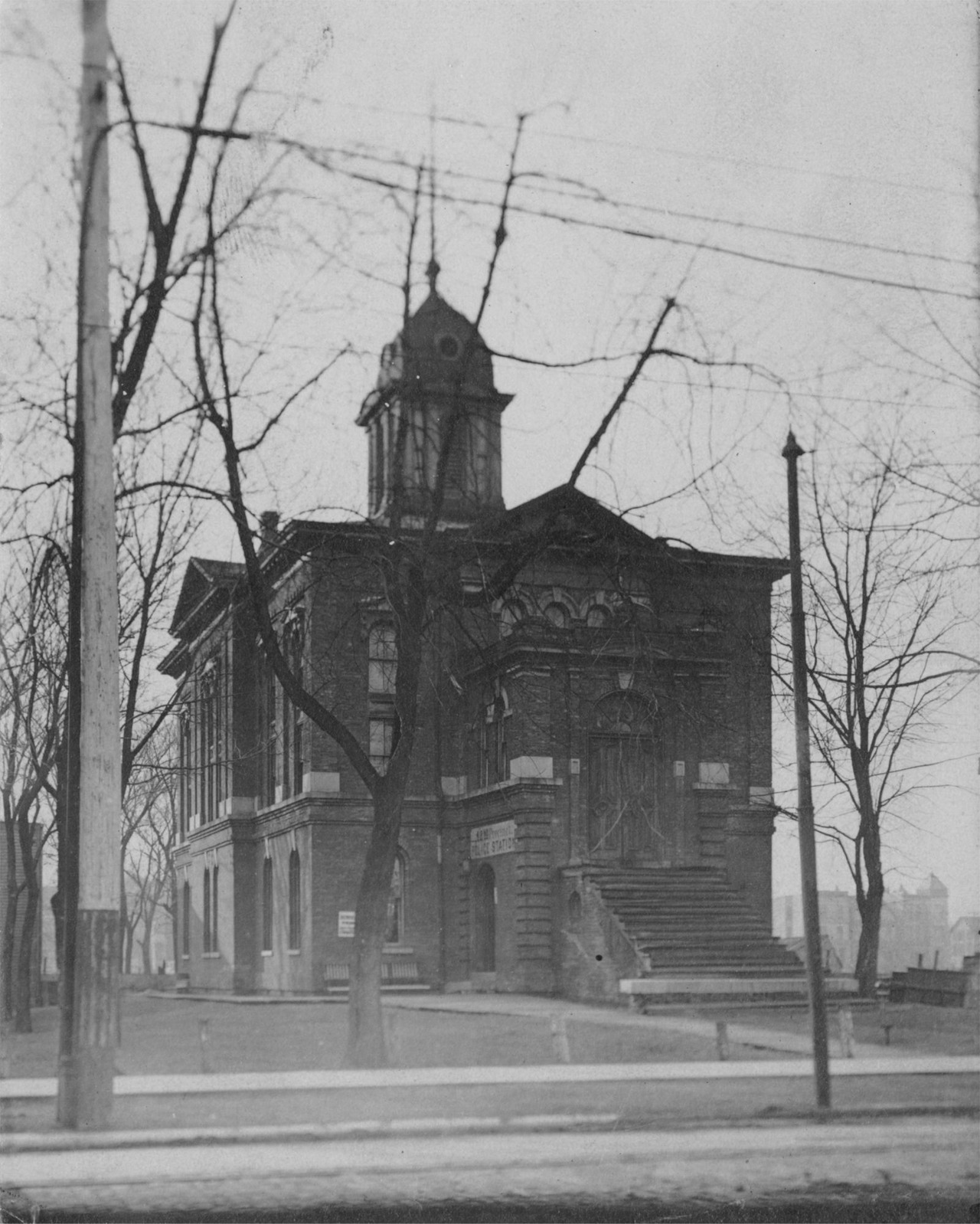
The original town hall on the lot that 42nd precinct now stands

Between 1857 and 1889, the area north of North Avenue, east of Western Avenue and south of Devon Avenue was a separate township from Chicago called Lake View. The township of Lake View saw a significant growth in population from 2,000 in 1870 to 45,000 in 1887. Under the weight of public service demands, the township of Lake View was annexed to Chicago in 1889. The 42nd Precinct's current location is historically considered the municipal center of the township of Lake View and it was on this site that the Lake View Town Hall previously sat.

The city of Chicago decided to de-centralize its police department and establish constable run stations across the city. Consequently, soon after its annexation in 1906, the old town hall was torn down and construction on a police station began.

== History ==
In 1959 police districts were consolidated and the 42nd Precinct became the home of the 19th District, which extended from Lawrence Avenue on the North to Fullerton Avenue on the south, and from Lake Michigan on the east to the Chicago River north branch on the west.

In 1966 it was decided that the Town Hall Station could not provide adequate room for new equipment. Subsequently, a new 19th district police station was built on the grounds of the former Riverview Amusement Park at 2452 W. Belmont. Rather than having the new station supplant the Town Hall District, officials split the district down the middle. The new station became the 19th district and the Town Hall Station became the new 23rd District. Clark Street became the dividing line between the two districts. In 2004, the lockup at the Town Hall Station closed and all arrested in the 23rd District were taken to the 19th.

In 2010, construction finished on a new 44,00-square foot station behind the old Town Hall Station at 850 W. Addison. It is now once again the home of the 19th District.

The station was listed on the National Register of Historic Places on January 29, 2013.

== 1969 bombing ==
On December 6, 1969, during the Days of Rage, a bomb was detonated on the hood of a squad car in a lot across the street from the precinct. An arson investigator at the time said it was "Strictly kids stuff" in reference to the improvised explosive. A coffee cup was filled with black powder and a wick was used to ignite it. The explosive damaged the car and shattered 20 to 30 windows in a neighboring building at 742 Addison Street.

The attack was thought to be in retaliation against police officer Richard Nuccio, who had shot a 19 year old Ronald Nelson a year earlier. The explosion happened at 12:20am. There were no injuries and no suspects were ever apprehended.
