= Our Lady of Mount Carmel Church (Chicago) =

Church building in Lake View, IL, USA

Coordinates: 41°56′25″N 87°38′49″W

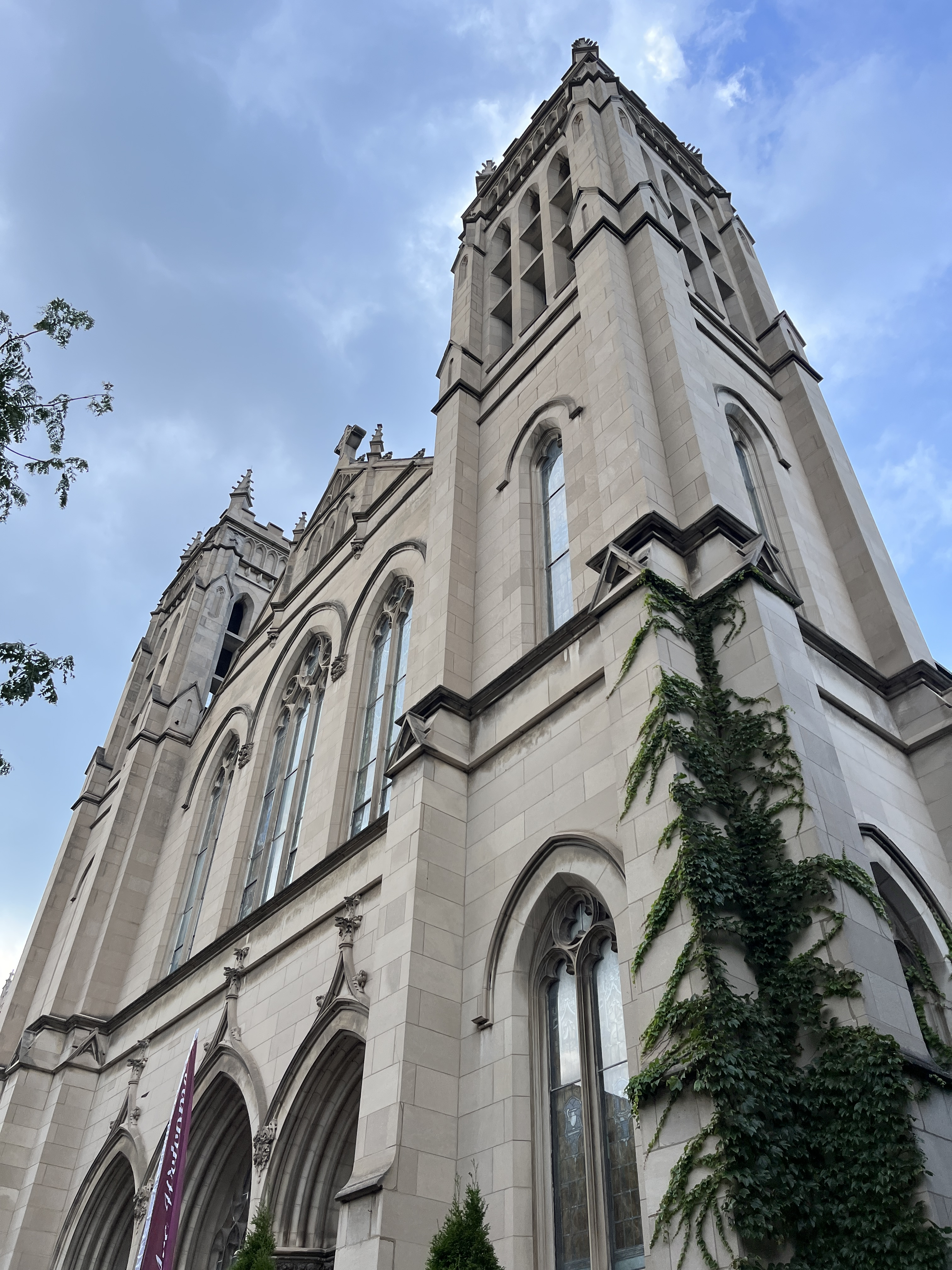
The Our Lady of Mount Carmel Church in Lake View, Chicago.

Our Lady of Mount Carmel Church is a Catholic church located in Lake View, Chicago, Illinois. It was established in 1886 by Fr. Patrick O’Brien. The church is also associated with the private K-8 school, Our Lady of Mount Carmel Academy, which was established in 1888.

In May 2025, the school gained widespread attention when it held a mock conclave, in which a student was elected pope and took the papal name Augustine. Two days later, Cardinal Robert Francis Prevost of the Order of Saint Augustine, who was born and raised in Chicago, was elected as Pope Leo XIV.
