= Lake View State Bank Building =

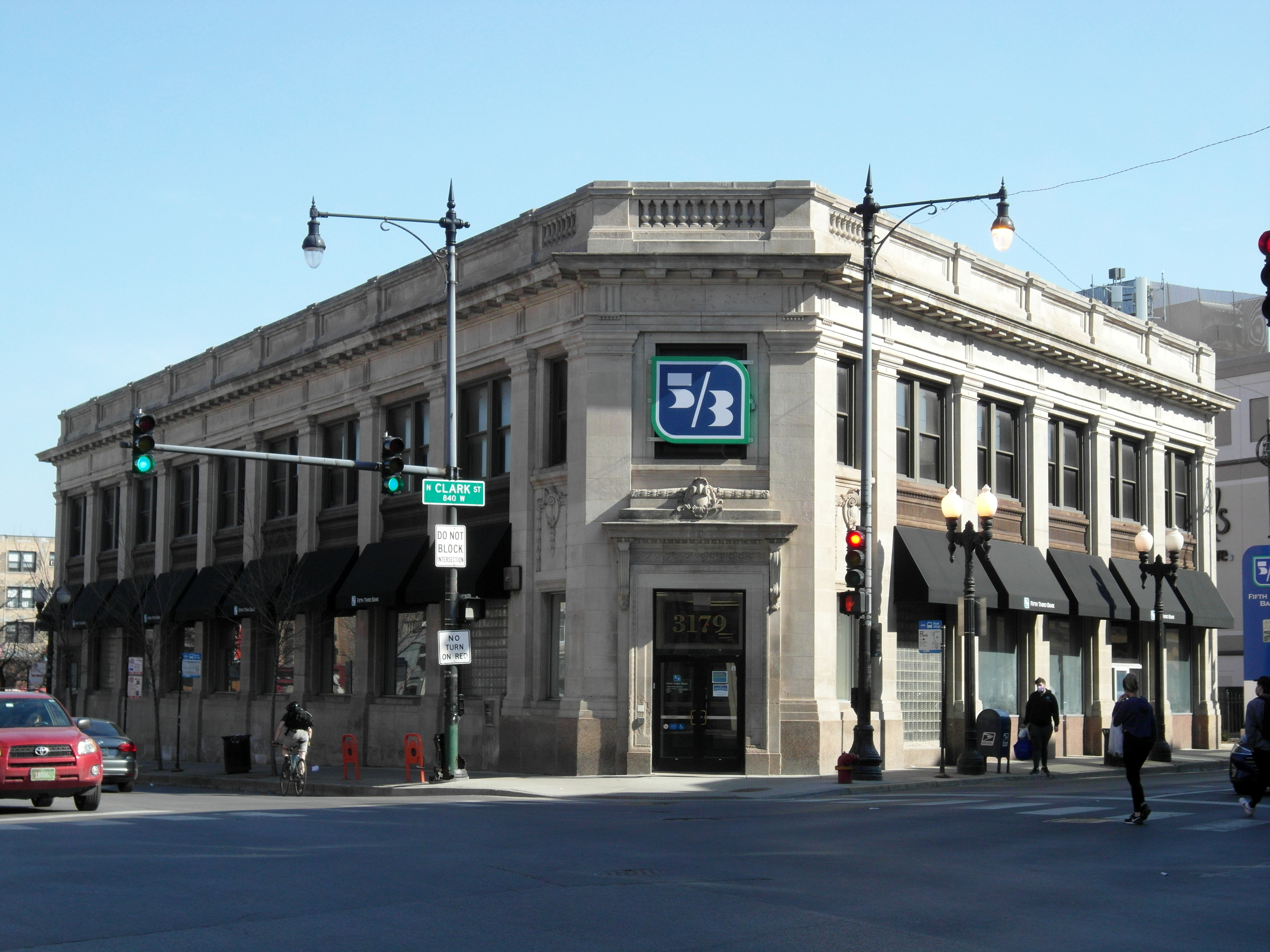
- Interactive map of the Lake View State Bank Building area

General information
- Location: 3179 N. Clark Street, Chicago, Illinois
- Coordinates: 41°56′23.26″N 87°39′0.89″W
- Completed: 1920
- Demolished: August 2021

Technical details
- Floor count: 2

Design and construction
- Architect: Ivar Viehe-Naess

The Lake View State Bank Building was a bank building at 3179 N. Clark Street, Chicago, Illinois. It was designed by Ivar Viehe-Naess and was built at a cost of $125,000 in 1920. It replaced Lake View State Bank's previous building which was a half-block south and was built five years earlier. The building was demolished in August 2021.

The bank became insolvent during the Great Depression, and was closed by the State Auditor on September 22, 1930. On July 1, 1946, the Belmont National Bank opened in the building. The building also housed medical offices in the mid-20th century. In 1968, the Belmont National Bank doubled the floor space it occupied in the building, and opened a drive-thru banking service. In 1987, Water Tower Trust and Savings Bank purchased Belmont National Bank, and in 1993 it was sold to River Forest Bancorp. The building last housed a Fifth Third Bank branch and the LGBT Chamber of Commerce of Illinois. The Hubbard Street Group demolished the building in favor of new construction, but did not disclose who planned to occupy the new building in advance.

A demolition permit was issued August 4, 2021, and demolition began August 13. Because the bank was FDIC insured, the application for a demolition permit should have triggered a review to determine whether the bank was a historic building, according to Section 106 of the National Historic Preservation Act. However, no review took place.
