= British International School of Chicago Lincoln Park =

British International School of Chicago, Lincoln Park

Location
- 814 & 821 W. Eastman Street; Chicago, Illinois 60642; United States; 41.9076°N 87.6487°W

Information
- School type: Preschool and Primary School
- Established: 2001
- Principal: Mike Henderson
- Grades: Pre-Nursery to Year 6 (5th Grade)
- Age range: 15 months to 11 years
- Campus type: Urban
- Houses: 4 (Blackhawk, Dayton, Eastman, Halsted)
- Accreditation: IPC, IEYC, IB, CIS
- Website: http://www.bischicagolp.org

The British International School of Chicago, Lincoln Park (BISC Lincoln Park) is a private international school located in the Lincoln Park neighbourhood of Chicago, Illinois. Established in 2001, the school serves students from pre-nursery through Year 6 (5th grade). It offers a curriculum based on the International Primary Curriculum and the National Curriculum (England, Wales and Northern Ireland). The school has been operated by Nord Anglia Education since 2006.

== History ==
Originally called the British School of Chicago, the school opened in 2001 in the Edgewater Community Area, near the Manor House in Bryn Mawr Historic District, intending to offer parents an alternative to the public school model. It was the fourth school to be opened in the United States by the British Schools of America and the first campus to open in the Midwest. In 2006, the school was acquired by Nord Anglia Education. In 2008, the school relocated to a newly constructed building in the Lincoln Park neighborhood.

== Curriculum ==
The British International School of Chicago bases its global education learning goals on the International Primary Curriculum, as well as the National Curriculum. The school teaches art, entrepreneurship and innovation, information and computing technology, literacy, math, foreign languages, music, physical education, health, and science. In particular, the school emphasizes the benefits of a STEAM program, including a program centered on the subjects developed in collaboration with the Massachusetts Institute of Technology. The school participates in Nord Anglia Education's global programs, including the Juilliard–Nord Anglia Performing Arts Program.
