= British International School of Chicago, South Loop =

The British International School of Chicago, South Loop

Location
- 161 W. 9th Street; Chicago, Illinois 60605; United States
- 41°52′13″N 87°37′57″W

Information
- School type: Preschool, Primary, Middle and High School, Private school, International school
- Motto: Be Ambitious!
- Established: 2001
- Principal: Mike Henderson
- Grades: Pre-Nursery to Year 13 (12th Grade)
- Age range: 3 to 18
- Campus type: Urban
- Houses: 4 (Great Wall, Pyramids, Stonehenge, Rushmore)
- Accreditation: IB, CIS, COBIS
- Website: British International School of Chicago, South Loop

The British International School of Chicago, South Loop it is a private international school, located in the South Loop area of Chicago. BISC-SL offers education for ages 3 to 18 (UK Nursery to Year 13/US Pre-K to Grade 12).

== History ==
The school, then British School of Chicago, was founded in 2001. Located in the Andersonville neighborhood the school opened with 14 students ages 3–5. In 2008, with 350 students across all 15 grades, the school relocated to a new building in the Lincoln Park neighborhood which is now the current site of British International School of Chicago, Lincoln Park. In 2015, British International School of Chicago expanded to a second campus in the South Loop neighborhood.

== Curriculum ==
In preschool through grade 5, the school utilized the English National Curriculum in conjunction with the International Primary Curriculum (IPC). In grades 6-8, student focus solely on the English National Curriculum. In grades 9-10, students follow the International General Certificate of Secondary Studies (IGCSE) and in grades 11-12 students study the International Baccalaureate Diploma Programme.

== Global Initiatives ==
=== Global Campus ===
Nord Anglia students are connected through Global Campus, an initiative which use online communities to connect students with their international counterparts. The program offers activities undertaken in school, online or at destinations around the world.
