= Episcopal Church of the Atonement and Parish House =

Historic church in Illinois, United States

- Episcopal Church of the Atonement and Parish House, The
- U.S. National Register of Historic Places
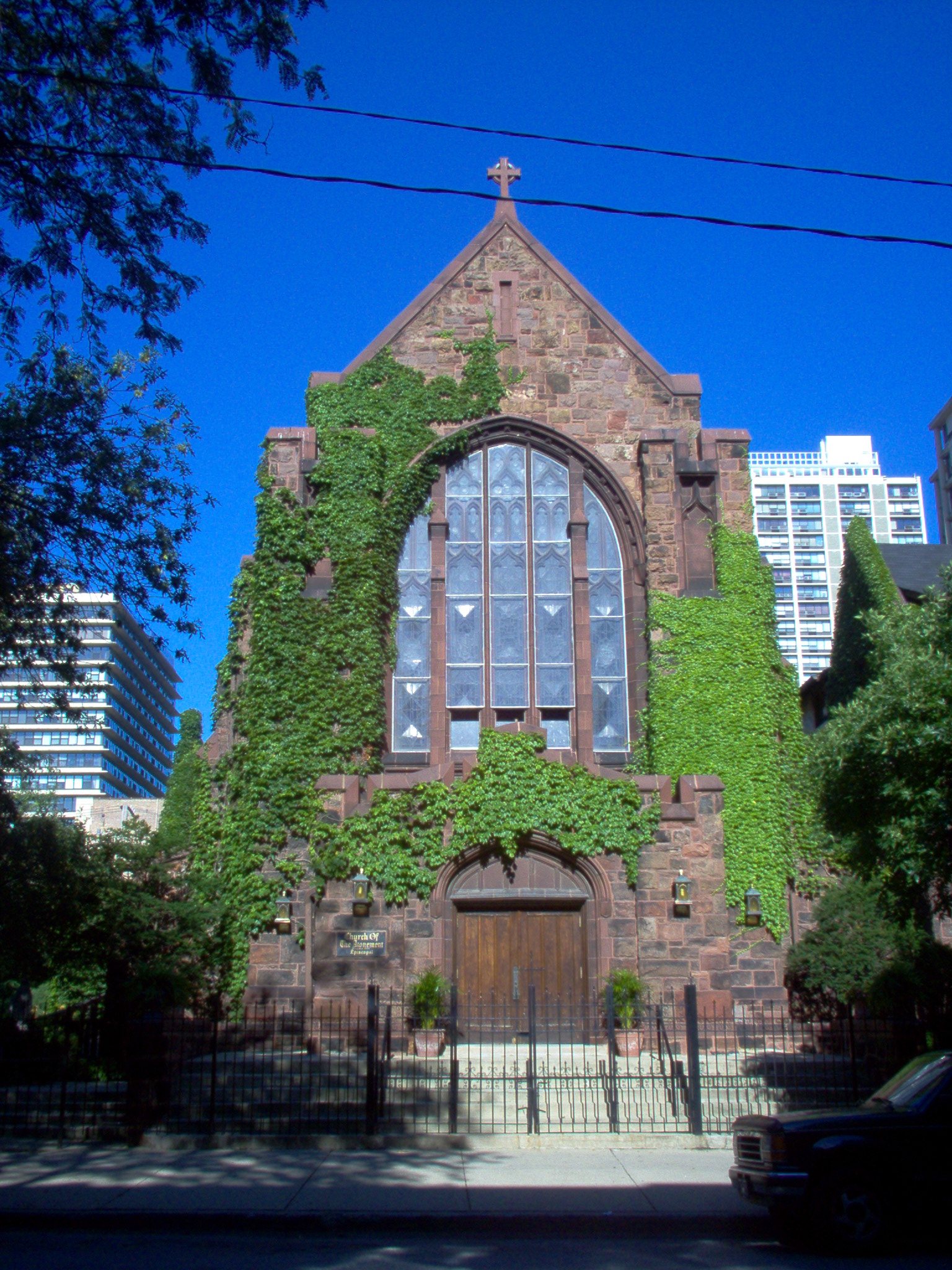

- Location within Chicago metropolitan area Location within Illinois Location within the United States
- Location: 5751 N. Kenmore Ave., Chicago, Illinois
- Coordinates: 41°59′13″N 87°39′23″W
- Area: less than one acre
- Built: 1889
- Architect: Henry Ives Cobb
- Architectural style: Gothic Revival
- NRHP reference No.: 09000590
- Added to NRHP: July 30, 2009

The Episcopal Church of the Atonement and Parish House is a historic church building at 5751 N. Kenmore Ave. in Edgewater, Chicago, Illinois. It was constructed in the Gothic Revival architectural style in 1889 and added to the National Register of Historic Places in 2009. The church reported 431 members in 2018 and 446 members in 2023; no membership statistics were reported in 2024 parochial reports. Plate and pledge income reported for the congregation in 2024 was $695,195 with average Sunday attendance (ASA) of 169 persons.

The building is home to the Church of the Atonement, also simply called Atonement. It is a parish of the Diocese of Chicago in The Episcopal Church.

Atonement self-identifies as Anglo-Catholic. It is deeply rooted in the Church of England and Anglicanism. Worship is based on the Book of Common Prayer and is high church in style. It celebrates Solemn High Mass on Sundays and Holy Days, has regular Evensong, and weekly Rosary in devotion to the Virgin Mary. It uses the New Revised Standard Version of the Bible.

== History ==
In 1886 several Episcopalian families met in the Guild Hall at Bryn Mawr and Winthrop Avenues (the first commercial building in the Edgewater neighborhood then on the outskirts of Chicago), and decided that a Church should be built. By June 17, 1888, then-lawyer Frederick W. Keator held a service in the hall, and by November 1888 the group had become a mission congregation within the diocese, taking as the name of Church of the Atonement. The original Church's cornerstone was laid on November 30, 1889 at the present site (the intersection of Kenmore and Ardmore Avenues), and consecrated in June 1890. By then, Keator had left his legal practice and had become a minister, as well as the first-priest-in-charge of the new mission. He remained at the parish until 1896, when he accepted a call from a church in Iowa, near his childhood home, and soon become the first Bishop of the Missionary Diocese of Olympia, Washington.

In May 1898 the Mission became a self-supporting Parish and had 120 members, and construction of the Parish House began south of the church. The Parish House was finished in 1901.

By the early 20th century, the parish had become one of the leading Anglo-Catholic parishes in the country. Beginning under Rector Charles E. Deuel (1903-1914) in 1910, the original church building was enlarged to twice its capacity, since by then the parish had more than 500 members. This expansion and the 1919 expansion were under the guidance of British born parishioner J.E.O. Pridmore, who carefully maintained the English Gothic church style. The first service after the last expansion was on Easter in 1920. The parish then had 650 members, and Rector Frederick Fleming (who served from 1915-1927) would represent the Diocese of Chicago at several Anglo-Catholic conferences. Fleming would leave this parish to accept a call as rector of St. Stephen's Church in Providence, Rhode Island in 1927, and finished his career as rector of historic Holy Trinity Church in Manhattan, New York City. Meanwhile, in 1922 a new Parish House was begun and completed in 1924. Stained glass windows were added beginning in 1929, under Rector Alfred Newberry (1927-1937; who would ultimately leave to accept a call from the Church of the Advent in Boston) and finished in 1946.

Under Rector Dean Paxton Rice, the church received a donation of an Elizabethan-era paneled room (installed in the Parish House), and also expanded its outreach to the diverse and changing neighborhood. It established St. Augustine's Mission to the Native American community in the nearby Uptown neighborhood. In the 1970s, the church established a ministry to Spanish-speaking neighbors. The parish also developed a distinguished music program, including a choir which expanded under the Rev. Thomas Harris to include women, and a custom-built organ.

== Architecture ==
Parishioner Henry Ives Cobb designed the original church building, including a stone tower on the northwest corner and constructing the east wall of wood to facilitate future expansion. Cobb was known for his English Gothic and Richardson Romanesque buildings, including the Potter Palmer Mansion, the Newberry Library and the Old Chicago Historical Society on Dearborn and Ontario Streets (now a nightclub). He also designed the Fisher Building.

Pridmore's expansion, finished during World War I, created the current church. The roof was raised and extended 16 feet, to Kenmore Avenue, and side aisles added. Stained glass windows were added, with the final one installed at the end of World War II, and after Pridmore's death.

The best example of the stained glass is the Christ the King window in the North Chapel. It has been recognized in books on stained glass in Chicago as one of the best.

On the second level of the Parish House, is the Elizabethan Room. It was brought to the United States from England in 1620. The paneling is registered with the Art Institute of Chicago and is the only authentic example of its kind in the Midwest.

== Rectors ==
Shield of The Episcopal Church

Serving the bishop of Chicago, Atonement is led by a rector who serves as pastor. The congregation is served by a vestry to conduct the business of the parish.

The rectors having served Atonement are:

- The Rev. Frederic William Keator (1855-1925), Lay reader/Priest-in-Charge 1888-1896
- The Rev. J. M. D. Davidson (1854-1931), Priest-in-Charge 1896-1898, Rector 1898-1903
- The Rev. Charles E. Deuel (1864-1932), Rector 1903-1914
- The Frederic Sydney Fleming (1886-1956), Rector 1915-1927
- The Rev. Alfred Newbery (1889-1937), Rector 1927-1937
- The Rev. Calvert Buck (1895-1969), Rector 1937-1943
- The Rev. James Murchison Duncan (1902-1968), Rector 1943-1950
- The Rev. Robert Leonard Miller (1914-1992), Rector 1950-1958, Canon to the Ordinary, Diocese of Chicago 1961-1978
- The Rev. Dean Paxton Rice (1932-2003), Rector 1958-2003, Dean, Chicago-North Deanery 1969-1991
- The Rev. John David van Dooren, Rector 2005-2017
- The Rev. Erika Lee Takacs, Rector 2018-2022
- The Rev. Charles Everson, Rector 2023–present ^{incumbent}

== Edgewater Community Religious Association ==
Atonement is a founding member of the Edgewater Community Religious Association (ECRA), "an interfaith association of religious organizations who work toward fostering friendships and understanding of other faiths, and to nurture a thriving and just neighborhood. For decades, ECRA has linked religiously diverse neighbors to create solutions to local problems, including the Edgewater Community Council and creating Edgewater's food pantry, Care for Real."

Its membership includes:

- Ebenezer Lutheran Church (ELCA)
- Edgewater Presbyterian Church (Presbyterian)
- Emanuel Congregation (Union for Reform Judaism)
- EncounterPoint (Catholic)
- Immanuel Lutheran Church (ELCA)
- Ismaili Jamatkhana (Ismaili Muslim)
- Loyola University Chicago (Catholic)
- NewStory Chicago (Baptist)
- North Shore Baptist Church (Baptist)
- Sacred Heart Schools (Catholic)
- St. Andrew's Greek Orthodox Church (Greek Orthodox)
- St. Gertrude Catholic Church (Catholic)
- The Tibet Center Chicago (Tibetan Buddhist)
- United Church of Rogers Park (Congregationalist)

ECRA religious leaders meet regularly for lunch or shared liturgy. It commemorates an annual ecumenical Juneteenth service and an ecumenical Thanksgiving service on the Sunday before Thanksgiving Day. The events are rotated between houses of worship.
