= Bryn Mawr Apartment Hotel =

Apartment building in Chicago, Illinois

Coordinates: 41.9835°N 87.6569°W

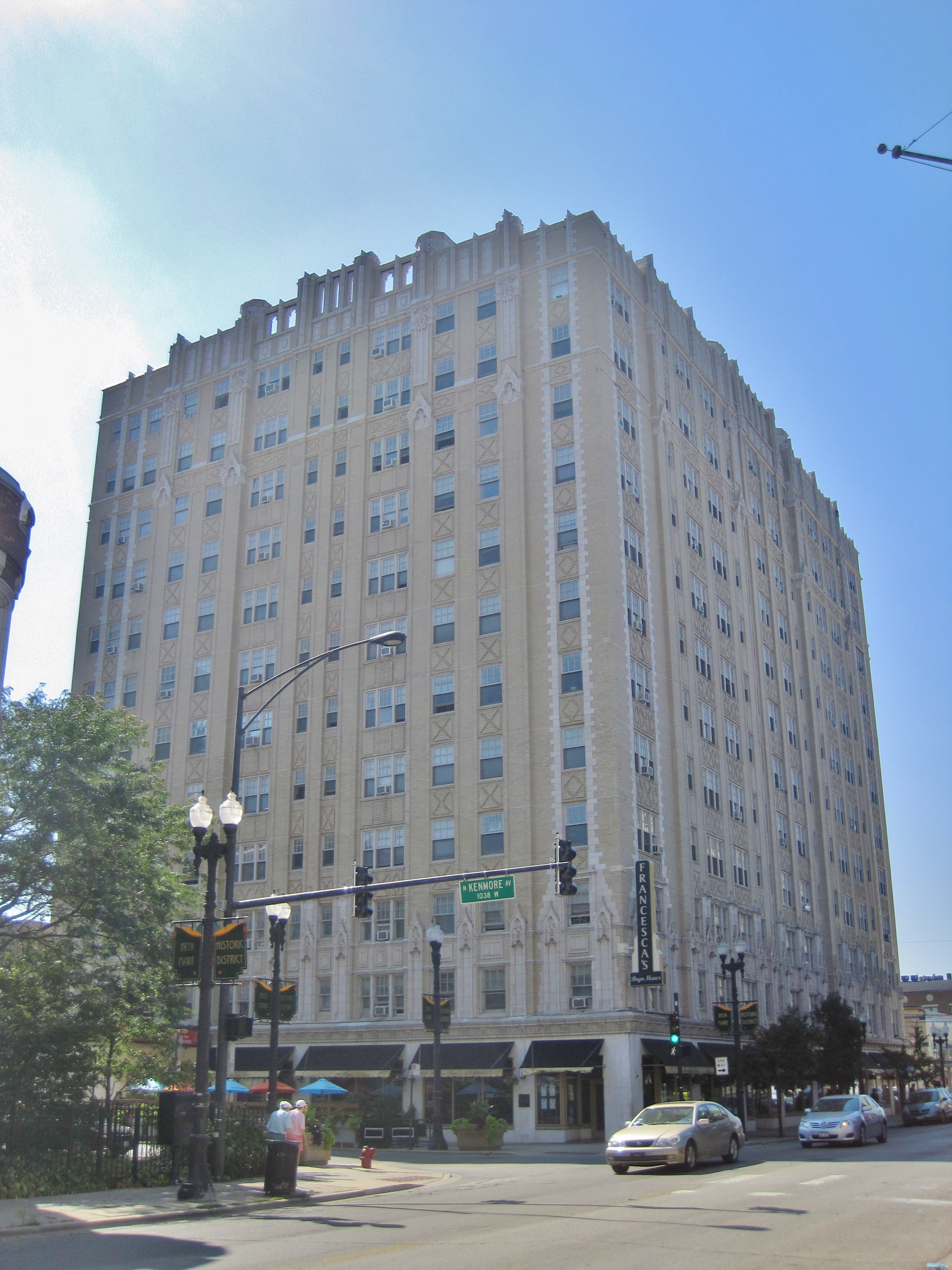
- (September 2013)
- Interactive map of the Bryn Mawr Apartment Hotel area
- Alternative names: The Bryn Mawr

General information
- Status: Completed
- Architectural style: neo-gothic
- Location: 5550 North Kenmore Avenue, Chicago
- Construction started: 1927
- Completed: 1928

Technical details
- Floor count: 12

Design and construction
- Architects: Levy & Klein

The Bryn Mawr Apartment Hotel is a 12-story building in the Bryn Mawr Historic District in far-north neighborhood community of Edgewater in Chicago, Illinois. Located on North Kenmore Avenue, it is across the road from the Belle Shore Apartment Hotel. It was designated a historic Chicago Landmark by the Chicago City Council on November 6, 2002.
