= Belle Shore Apartment Hotel =

Apartment building in Chicago, Illinois

Coordinates: 41.9838°N 87.6576°W

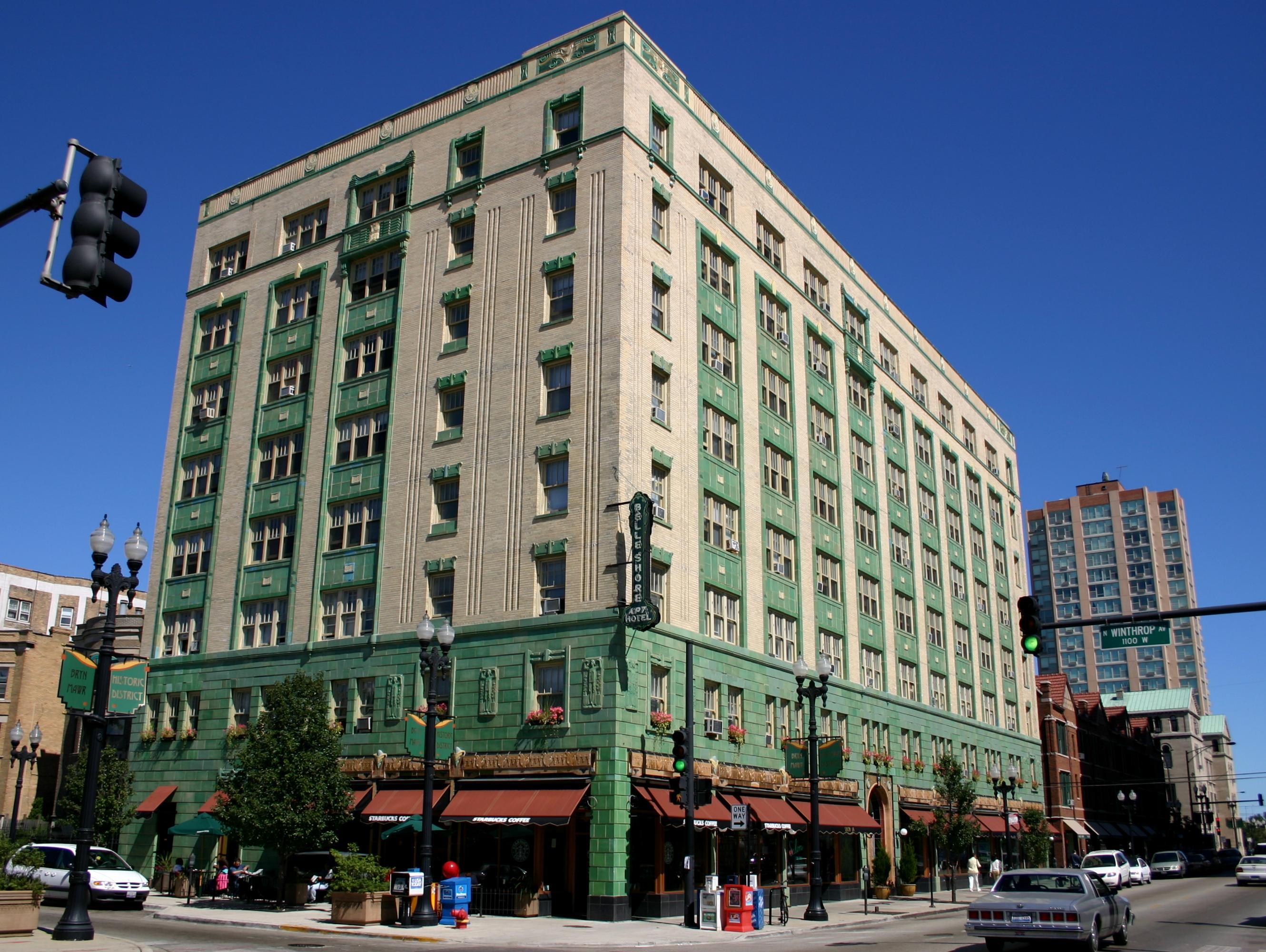
Edgewater's Belle Shore

The Belle Shore Apartment Hotel is a building in the Bryn Mawr Historic District in the far-north community area of Edgewater in Chicago, Illinois. Located on West Bryn Mawr Avenue, it is across the road from the Bryn Mawr Apartment Hotel. It was declared a historic Chicago Landmark by the Chicago City Council.
