= Park Tower and Mall =

Condominium building in Chicago, Illinois

Park Tower
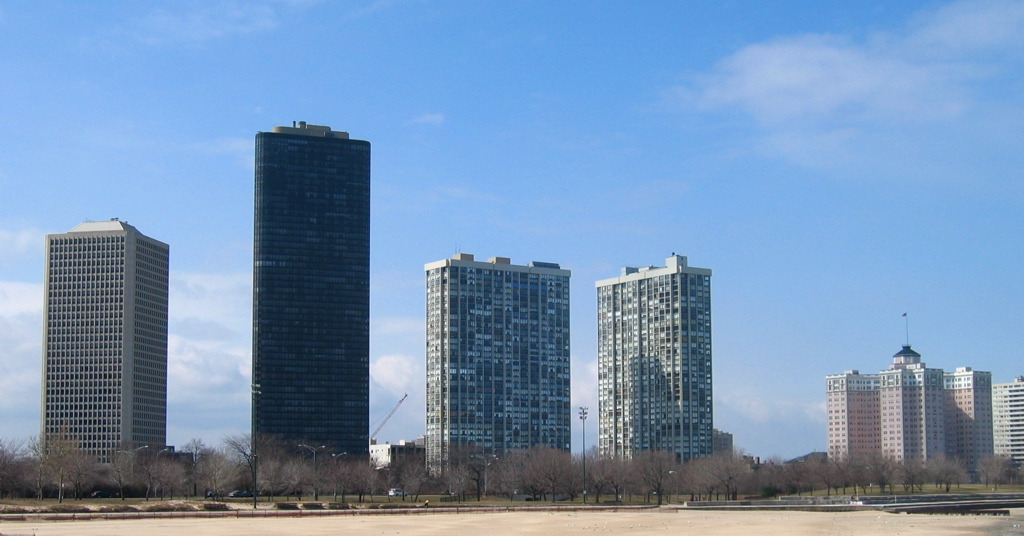
- Park Tower (2nd from left, in 2006)

- Location within Chicago metropolitan area Location within Illinois Location within the United States

General information
- Type: Condominium
- Location: 5415 North Sheridan Road, Chicago, Illinois, United States
- Coordinates: 41°58′49″N 87°39′17″W
- Construction started: 1971
- Completed: 1973
- Governing body: Park Tower Condominium Association

Height
- Height: 513 feet (156 m)

Technical details
- Floor count: 54
- Lifts/elevators: 6 in the tower, 2 in the mall

Design and construction
- Architecture firm: Solomon Cordwell Buenz
- Developer: Marshall Holleb

Other information
- Public transit: Red at Bryn Mawr and Berwyn

Website
- ptcondo.com

Park Tower is a high-rise residential building in the Edgewater community area on the shore of Lake Michigan in Chicago, Illinois. It is one of the largest all-residential buildings in Chicago and the second-tallest building in Illinois outside of downtown Chicago.

== Development ==
Originally constructed as 5415 EdgewaterBeach, on the former site of the Edgewater Beach Hotel, it was renamed Park Tower and Mall in 1979 when it was converted from apartments to condominiums.

== Amenities ==
The property includes a party room, an underground parking garage that holds over 300 cars, a bicycle storage room, a laundromat, an indoor swimming pool and hot tub, outdoor wading pool, rooms with weight lifting and cardio equipment, saunas, and a racquetball court. Many of the building's amenities are not included in residents' monthly assessments.

== Mall ==
Attached to Park Tower, at 5419 N Sheridan Rd, is an indoor shopping mall with 16 commercial units. Originally intended for retailers and services targeting Park Tower residents, the only remaining retailer is family-owned Chicago-area supermarket chain Go Grocer. The remainder of the units have been converted to office space, much of which has been taken by Lettuce Entertain You Enterprises.

== See also ==
- List of tallest buildings in Chicago
- List of tallest buildings in the United States
- World's tallest structures
