= Andersonville Commercial Historic District =

Historic district in Illinois, United States

Coordinates: 41.9803°N 87.6683°W

- U.S. National Register of Historic Places
- U.S. Historic district
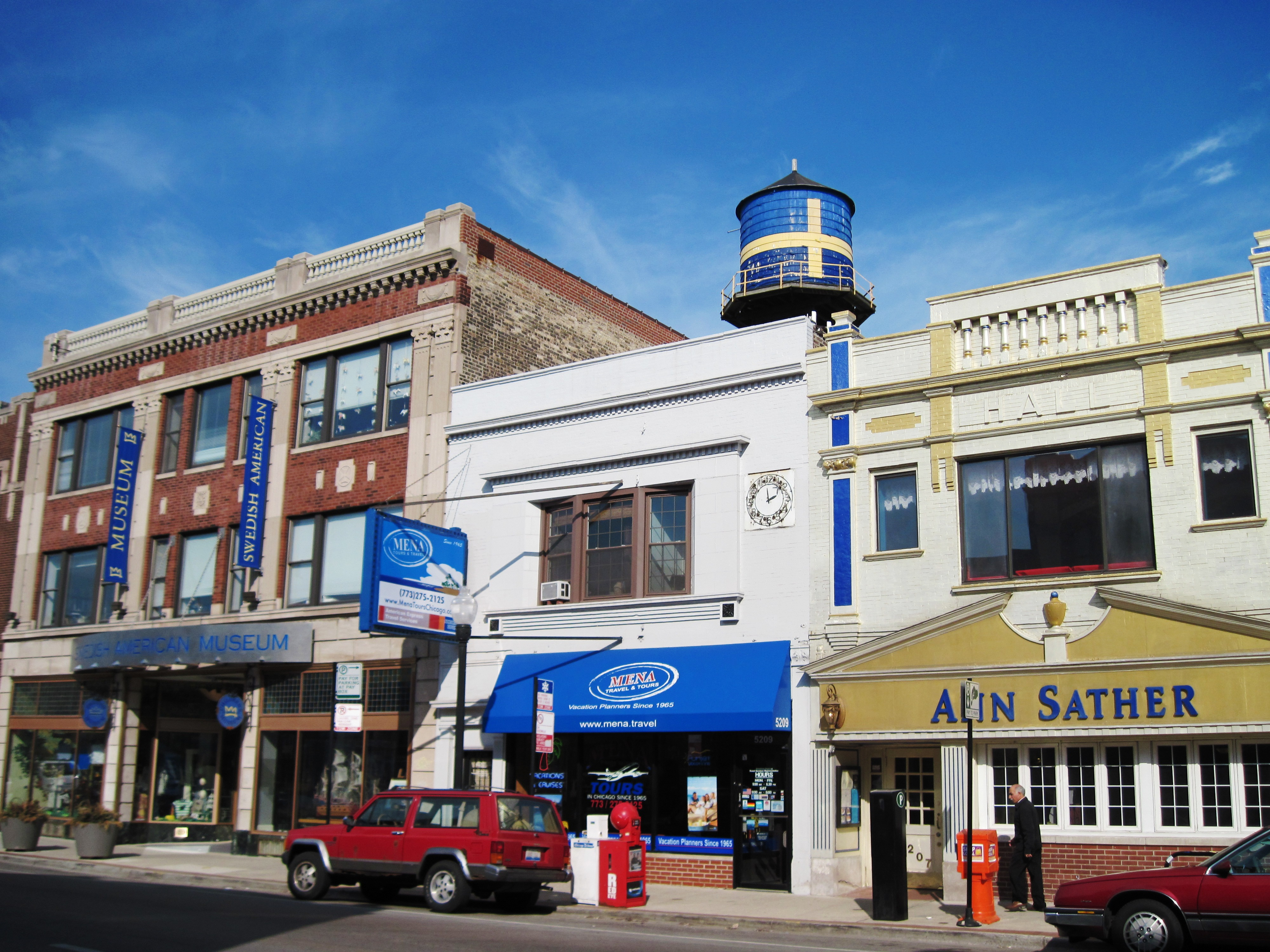
- Clark Street, north of Foster Avenue

- Location within Chicago metropolitan area Location within Illinois Location within the United States
- Location: 4900-5800 N. Clark Street, Chicago, Illinois
- NRHP reference No.: 08000294
- Added to NRHP: March 9, 2010

The Andersonville Commercial Historic District is a historic district in Chicago, Illinois. It runs from 4800 North Clark Street to 5800 North Clark Street in the city's Uptown and Edgewater neighborhoods. The area is home to a heavily Swedish American community.

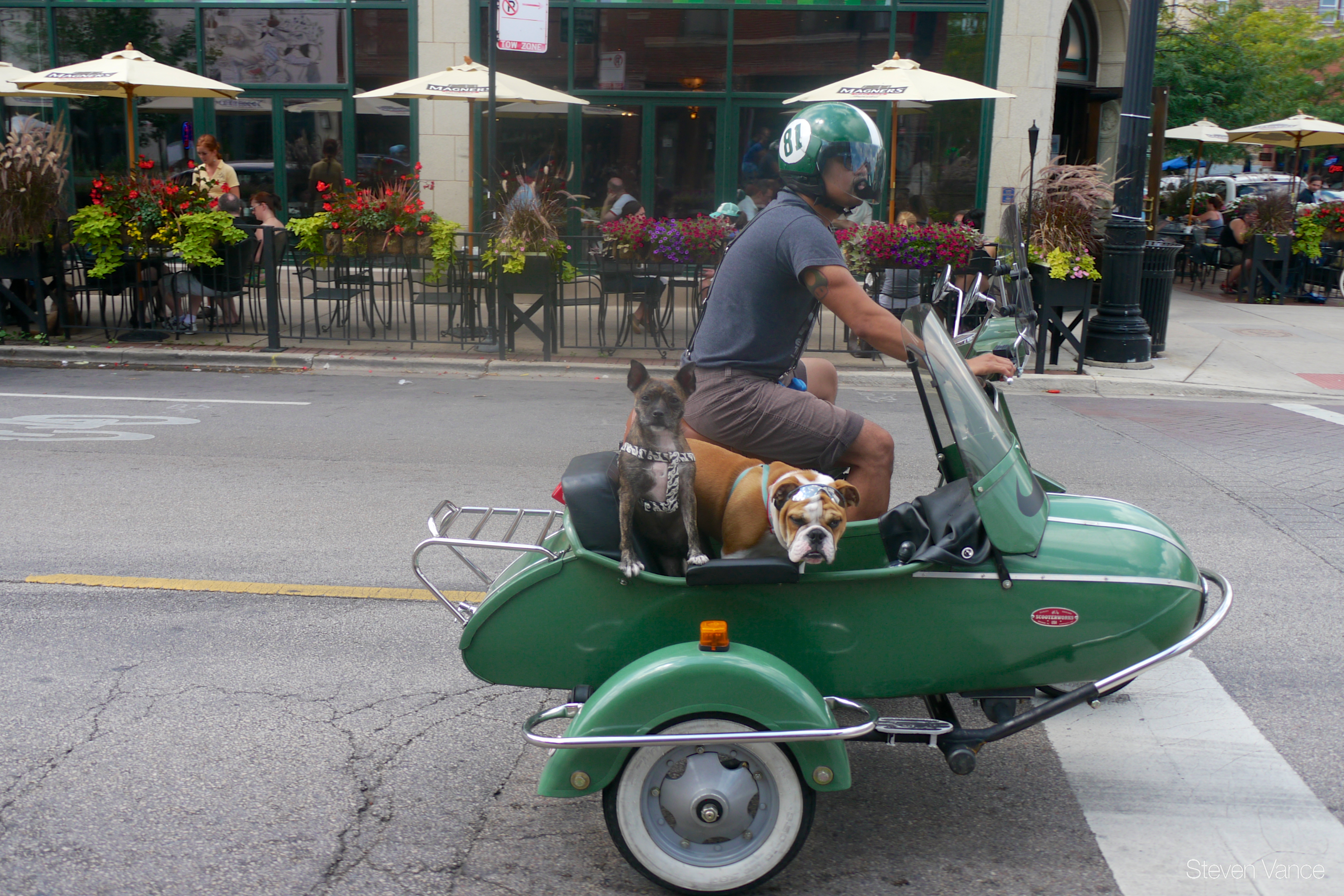

Many buildings in the district have remained intact since the early twentieth century. The district was added to the National Register of Historic Places on March 9, 2010.
