= Victory Theatre =

- Victory Theater and Hotel Sonntag
- U.S. National Register of Historic Places
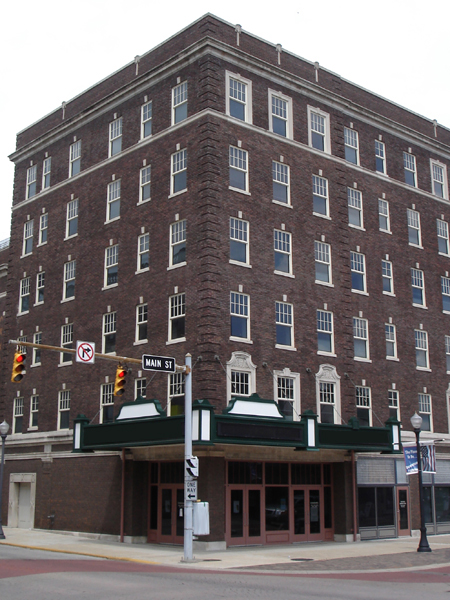
- Front and side of the theater

- Location within Indiana
- Location: 600–614 Main St., Evansville, Indiana
- Coordinates: 37°58′22″N 87°34′8″W
- Area: Less than 1 acre (4,000 m^{2})
- Built: 1921
- Architect: J.E.O. Pridmore
- MPS: Downtown Evansville MRA
- NRHP reference No.: 82000124
- Added to NRHP: July 1, 1982

The Victory Theatre is a 1,950-seat venue in Evansville, Indiana. It is home to the Evansville Philharmonic Orchestra and also hosts local ballet and modern dance companies, theatre companies, and touring productions.

Opened on June 16, 1921, and originally seating 2,500 patrons, the theater was part of the Sonntag Hotel–Victory Theater complex. In 1928, it featured Tenderloin, the first sound film to be played in Evansville. The Loews's Victory Theatre closed in 1971, and reopened in 1998 after a $15 million renovation.

The Victory was designed by architect John Pridmore of Chicago. The exterior is in the restrained style characteristic of commercial buildings of the era, but the auditorium is more ornate. The stage, 68 feet (21 m) wide and 82 feet (25 m) deep, was at the time it was built one of the largest in the Midwest. In 1982 it was added to the National Register of Historic Places.

It is owned by the City of Evansville and is co-managed with The Ford Center by VenuWorks.
