= Bryn Mawr Historic District =

Historic district in Illinois, United States

Coordinates: 41.9837°N 87.6575°W

- Bryn Mawr Avenue Historic District
- U.S. National Register of Historic Places
- U.S. Historic district
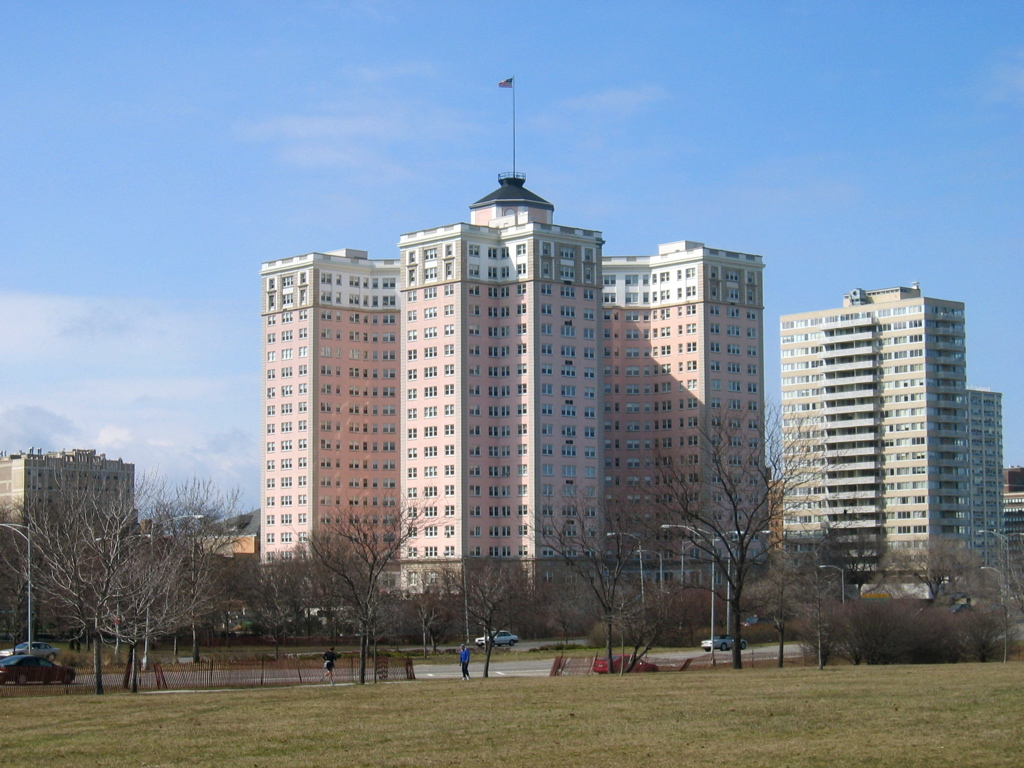
- The Edgewater Beach Apartments, built in 1927

- Location within Chicago metropolitan area Location within Illinois Location within the United States
- Location: Chicago, Illinois
- Built: 1897
- Architect: Benjamin H. Marshall; J. E. O. Pridmore
- Architectural style: Late 19th and 20th Century Revivals, Modern Movement
- NRHP reference No.: 95000482
- Added to NRHP: April 20, 1995

The Bryn Mawr Historic District (/ˈbrɪn mɑːr/ BRIN mar; from Welsh for 'big hill') is on the lakefront of the Edgewater neighborhood of far-north Chicago, Illinois. It extends along Bryn Mawr Avenue between Broadway and Sheridan Road. Its most prominent features are the Belle Shore Apartment Hotel, Bryn Mawr Apartment Hotel, Edgewater Beach Apartments, Edgewater Presbyterian Church, Manor House, and the northernmost area of Lincoln Park.

Old fashioned green lanterns and lamp posts, reminiscent of Chicago in the 1920s and 1930s, line the Bryn Mawr Historic District streets, adorned with green banners and gold lettering proudly proclaiming the neighborhood's historic significance. It was declared a historic district by the Chicago City Council due to the presence of several Chicago Landmark sites.

Bryn Mawr Avenue was named in the 1880s by Edgewater developer John Lewis Cochran after Bryn Mawr station on the Main Line north of Philadelphia. Bryn Mawr is Welsh for Big Hill.

== Landmarks ==
=== Bryn Mawr & Belle Shore Apartment Hotels ===
Built between 1928 and 1929, this pair of detailed buildings are symbolic of the rapid growth and expansion of Chicago in the 1920s and the commercial development of Bryn Mawr Avenue and the surrounding community. Situated across the street from each another, the buildings both feature extensive and lavish use of decorative terracotta. The 12-story Bryn Mawr is dressed in white terracotta designed in a late Gothic Revival style, while the 8-story Belle Shore is clad in rich green and cream terracotta and features Egyptian-like Art Deco designs.

Designated a Chicago Landmark on November 6, 2002.

=== Manor House ===
The 1907 Manor House residential complex was built by John Edmund Oldaker Pridmore in the Tudor Revival style. It features two symmetrical wings, each with a large turret. The building is listed on the National Register of Historic Places.

=== Edgewater Beach Apartments ===
This structure, dating to 1928, is the extension wing of a lavish hotel complex, the Edgewater Beach Hotel. Although once popular with celebrities and the elite, the extension of the Lake Shore Drive cut the hotel from the beach and led to its demolition. The building is listed on the National Register of Historic Places.

=== The Renaissance ===
This 17-story building is built in a Renaissance Revival style and was sold as apartment dwelling for the well-to-do.

The building is listed on the National Register of Historic Places.
