= State Theatre (Minneapolis) =

Theater and movie theater

Coordinates: 44.9768155°N 93.2759288°W

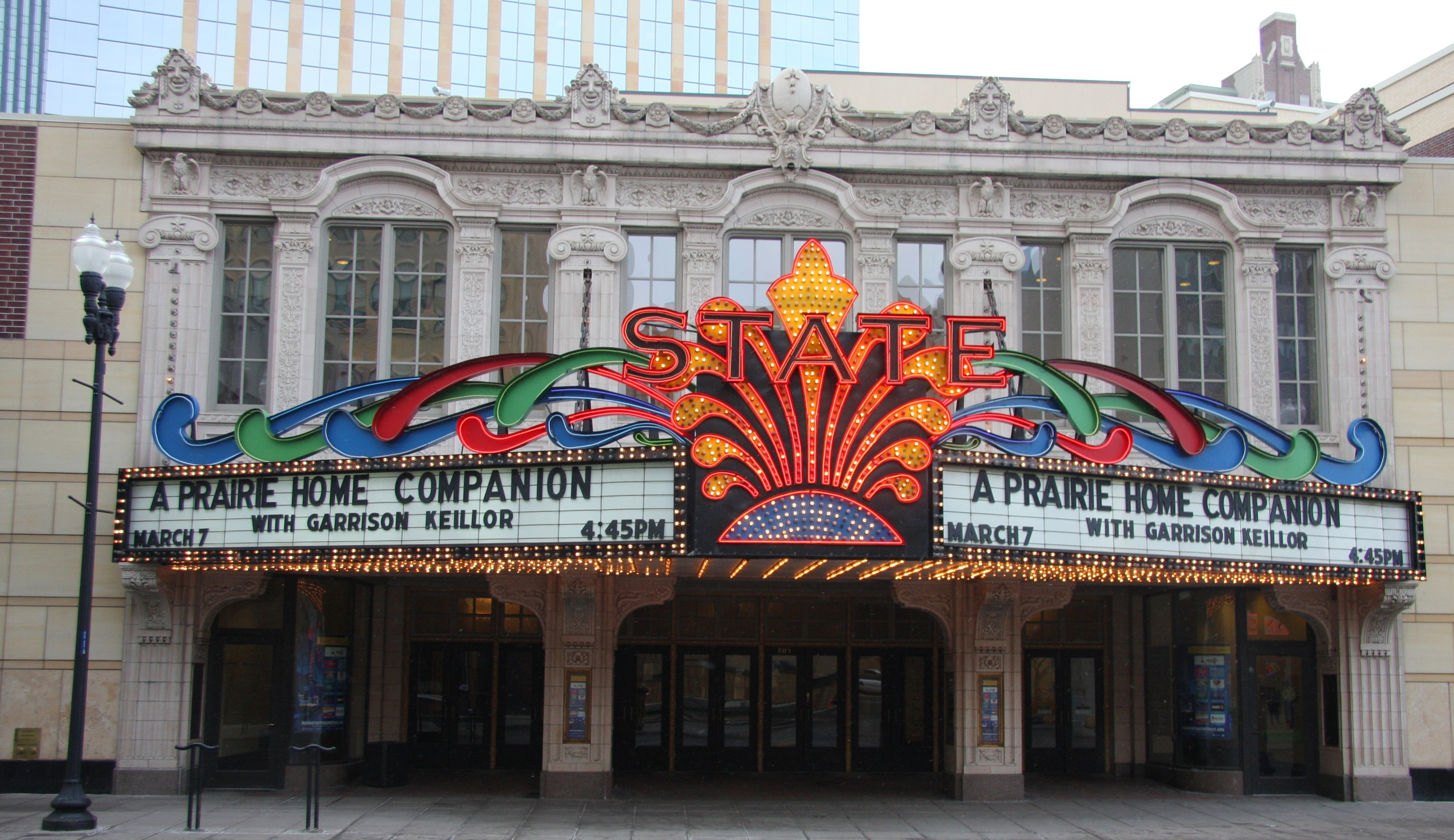
- State Theatre in 2015
- Interactive map of State Theatre
- Address: 805 Hennepin Avenue; Minneapolis, Minnesota; United States
- Owner: Hennepin Arts
- Operator: Historic Theatre Group
- Capacity: 2,181

Construction
- Opened: 1921
- Reopened: 1991
- Architect: J.E.O. Pridmore

Website
- hennepinarts.org/venues/state-theatre

The State Theatre is an historic theatre in Minneapolis, Minnesota, USA. It is one of four restored theatres in the Hennepin Theatre District. It is one of four restored theaters on Hennepin Avenue, along with the Orpheum Theatre, the Pantages Theatre, and the Shubert Theatre (now The Cowles Center).

The theatre seats 2,181. It opened in 1921 and was then considered the most technologically advanced and elaborate theatre in the United States. It was designed by the Chicago architect J.E.O. Pridmore in a free Italian Renaissance style and boasted the first well-driven air conditioning system in Minneapolis. The original stage floor was glass, lit from underneath to create stunning visual effects. The opening night program featured a silent film, newsreel and travelogue. A Wurlitzer pipe organ was installed in 1925 and concerts were held every day. The State's original neon marquee ran the entire width of the theatre; it was replaced with electric bulbs and large letters reading "STATE" in the 1940s. The neon sign was recreated for a modern remodel and now adorns the theatre's frontage. Between 1921 and 1978, the State was used primarily as a movie house, but also hosted vaudeville acts, concerts and ballet. The movie screen was the largest screen west of the Mississippi River at one time. Butch Cassidy and the Sundance Kid set a national record at the State in 1970 for the longest run of a motion picture in America. The final movie shown was Tommy on New Year's Eve 1975.

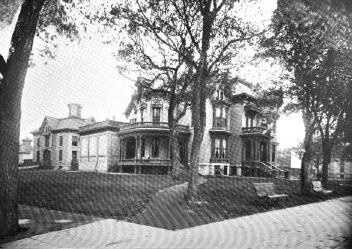
Walker home at 803 Hennepin Avenue

The theatre was built on the site of the first mansion constructed by T. B. Walker, at 803 Hennepin Avenue, in 1874. The home stood for forty years until it was demolished to make way for the theatre complex.

From 1978 to 1989, the building housed the Jesus People Church. Exterior State signage was replaced by church signage. Interior alterations were also made.

The Minneapolis Community Development Agency purchased the LaSalle Plaza block, including the State, in 1989 as part of the LaSalle Plaza development. After nearly two years of renovation at a cost of $8.8 million, the State Theatre re-opened under its original name in November 1991 with the Minnesota Opera's production of Carousel. The restored proscenium spans almost the full width of the building and curves 100 feet (30 m) above the stage. The six chandeliers in the house are original, as are the murals on the walls. Since the re-opening, the State has hosted live Broadway touring productions such as Avenue Q, Sweeney Todd and Joseph and the Amazing Technicolor Dreamcoat, concerts by Patti Smith and Gordon Lightfoot, author and adventure speaker series and films including the world premiere of the Minnesota-based and filmed movie, Grumpy Old Men. The theater appeared in the 1996 film Jingle All the Way with Arnold Schwarzenegger and Sinbad. Hennepin Theatre Trust has been the owner and operator since 2005.

Historic Theatre Group's original partner was Jujamcyn Productions. SFX (now Live Nation) bought Jujamcyn Productions in 2000. Live Nation sold most of its theatrical properties, including its Minneapolis operations, to Key Brand Entertainment in 2008. Steve Vai recorded his 2007 State concert, releasing it as both the live album and concert video, Where the Wild Things Are, in 2009.
