= Bush Temple of Music =

- U.S. National Register of Historic Places
- Chicago Landmark
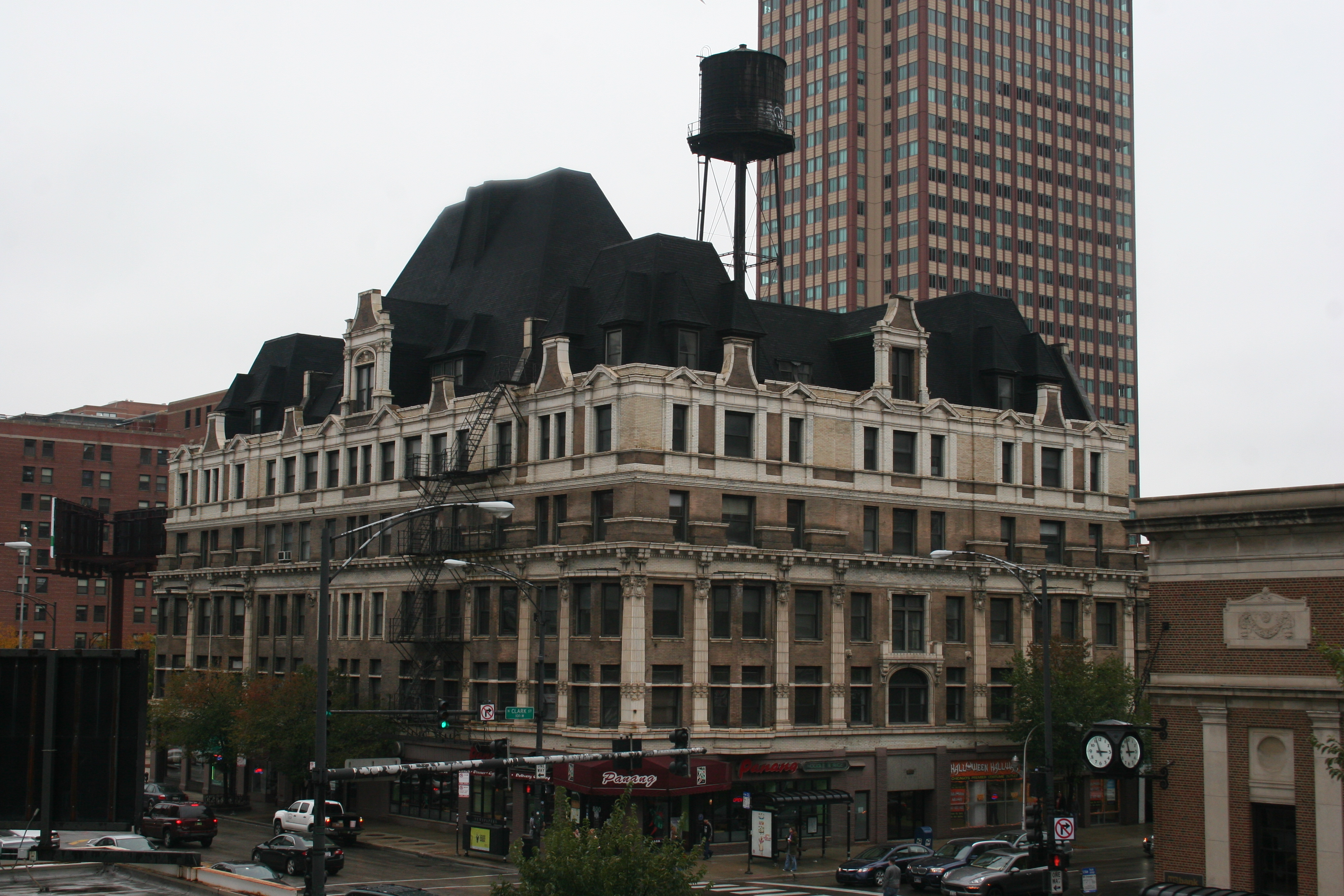

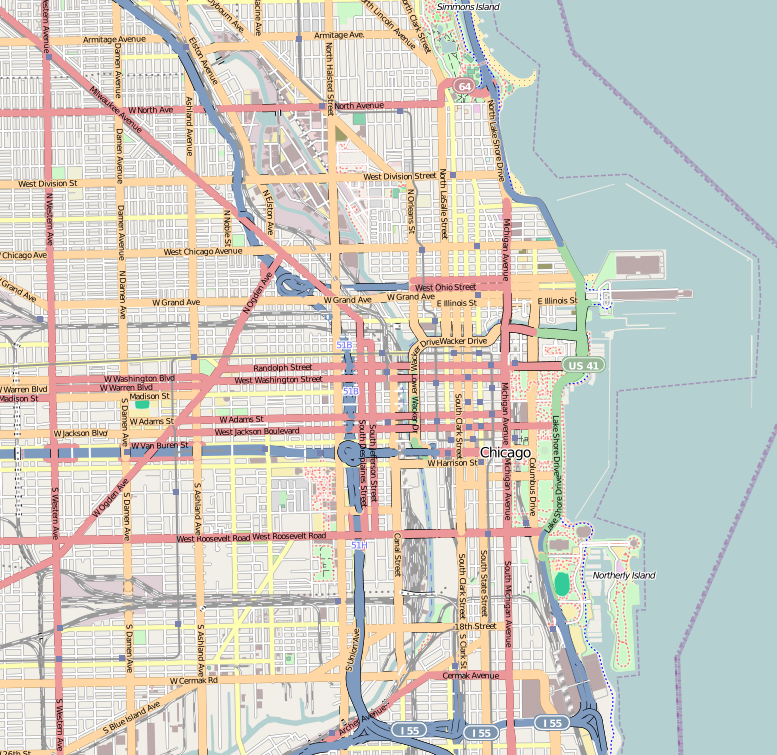
- Location within Central Chicago Location within Illinois Location within the United States
- Location: 100 W. Chicago Ave., 800 N. Clark St.
- Coordinates: 41°53′49″N 87°37′54″W
- Architect: J. E. O. Pridmore
- NRHP reference No.: 13001001
- Added to NRHP: December 31, 2013

The Bush Temple of Music, at 100 West Chicago Avenue in Chicago, Illinois, was built in 1901 as the headquarters and showroom of the Bush and Gerts Piano Company, one of Chicago's leading piano companies. Designed by architect J.E.O. Pridmore, the building is an example of the importance of piano manufacturing and sales during the late 19th and early 20th centuries when Chicago was the leading piano manufacturing center in the world. The building is a rare large-scale example of French Renaissance Revival-style architecture, an unusual style in Chicago and the United States. The building's design and decorative details are unique examples of the historic revival style favored by Chicagoans in the late nineteenth and early twentieth centuries. The building was designated a Chicago Landmark on June 27, 2001. It was listed on the National Register of Historic Places in 2013.

== See also ==
- Bush Conservatory of Music
- Chicago Landmark
