= J. E. O. Pridmore =

British-American architect (1867–1940)

John Edmund Oldaker Pridmore (July 18, 1864 – February 1, 1940) was a British-American architect, best known for his theater designs. He lived in Edgewater, Chicago and carried out many residential designs in the area. Pridmore was the architect for three homes he lived in at 6249 N. Magnolia, four years later he designed a larger house at 5959 North Winthrop (since demolished) where he spent the majority of his professional and family life, and then an apartment in the building at 6003 N. Winthrop, to the north of his house.

== Biography ==
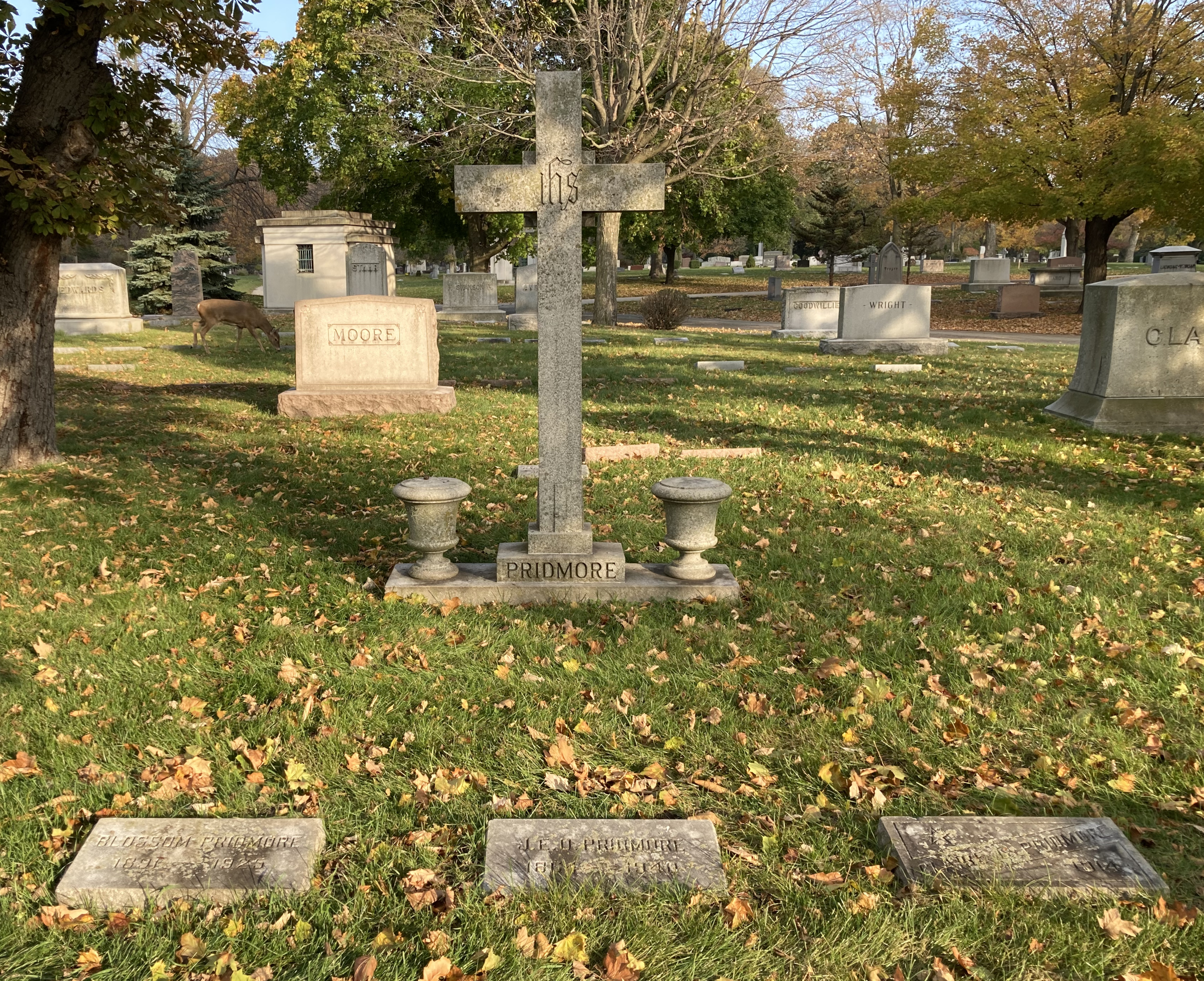
Pridmore's grave at Rosehill Cemetery

Pridmore was born in England on July 18, 1864, and educated in Birmingham. He immigrated to the United States in 1880, moving to Chicago, Illinois, in 1883. Pridmore apprenticed as an architect for the next seven years. He founded his own studio in 1890, partnering with Leon Stanhope for six years starting in 1893. Pridmore designed a number of apartment buildings in the Woodlawn, Austin, Edgewater, and Logan Square neighborhoods.

However, he became known as a prominent designer of theaters. In 1901, he designed the Bush Temple of Music at the intersection of Clark Street and Chicago Avenue. From 1909 to 1911, Joseph W. McCarthy studied under him. In 1918, he designed the Midway Theater in Rockford. The State Theater in Minneapolis, Minnesota, opened in 1921. Also that year, his Victory Theatre in Evansville, Indiana, opened. Pridmore worked out of the First National Bank Building in Chicago. He died on February 1, 1940, at the age of 75, and was buried at Rosehill Cemetery.

== Major works ==
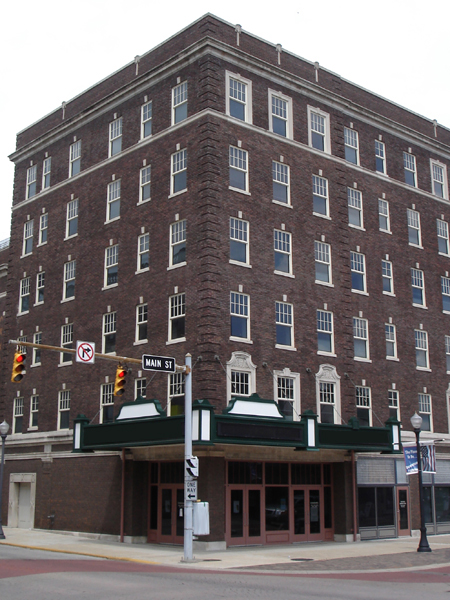
The Victory Theater in Evansville, Indiana

- D. H. Stapp House, Chicago, IL (1893)
- Richard Nash House, Chicago, IL (1895)
- Bush Temple of Music, Chicago, IL (1901)
- Catholic Apostolic Church, Chicago, IL (1901)
- National Theater, Chicago, IL (1904) (demolished)
- A. C. Barnes House, Chicago, IL (1905)
- Charles & Annie Murison House, Chicago, IL (1905)
- College Theater, Chicago, IL (1907) (demolished)
- Manor House, Chicago, IL (1908)
- Episcopal Church of the Redeemer (1909) (demolished)
- Oak Theater, Chicago, IL (1910) (demolished)
- Orpheum Theater in the Duluth Commercial Historic District, Duluth, MN (1910)
- Episcopal Church of the Atonement and Parish House, Chicago, IL (1910 and 1920 remodels)
- Columbia Theater, Chicago, IL (1911) (demolished)
- The Victoria Theater, Chicago, IL (1912)
- Lexington Theatre, Chicago, IL (1912) (demolished)
- Empress Theater, Chicago, IL (1913) (demolished)
- Episcopal Church of the Redeemer rectory (1915)
- Adelphi Theater, Chicago, IL (1917) (demolished)
- Liberty Theater, Terre Haute, IN (1918) (demolished)
- Midway Theater in the East Rockford Historic District, Rockford, IL (1918)
- Victory Theatre, Evansville, IN (1921)
- The People's Temple, Chicago, IL (1924)
- Chapel of St. John the Divine, Champaign, IL (1925)
- Sheridan Theatre, Chicago, IL (1927) (demolished)
- Venetian Theatre, Racine, WI (1928)
- Nortown Theater, Chicago, IL (1931) (demolished)
- Evanston Theater, Evanston, IL (1937) (demolished)
