= Manor House (Chicago) =

Apartment building in Chicago, Illinois

- U.S. National Register of Historic Places
- U.S. Historic district – Contributing property
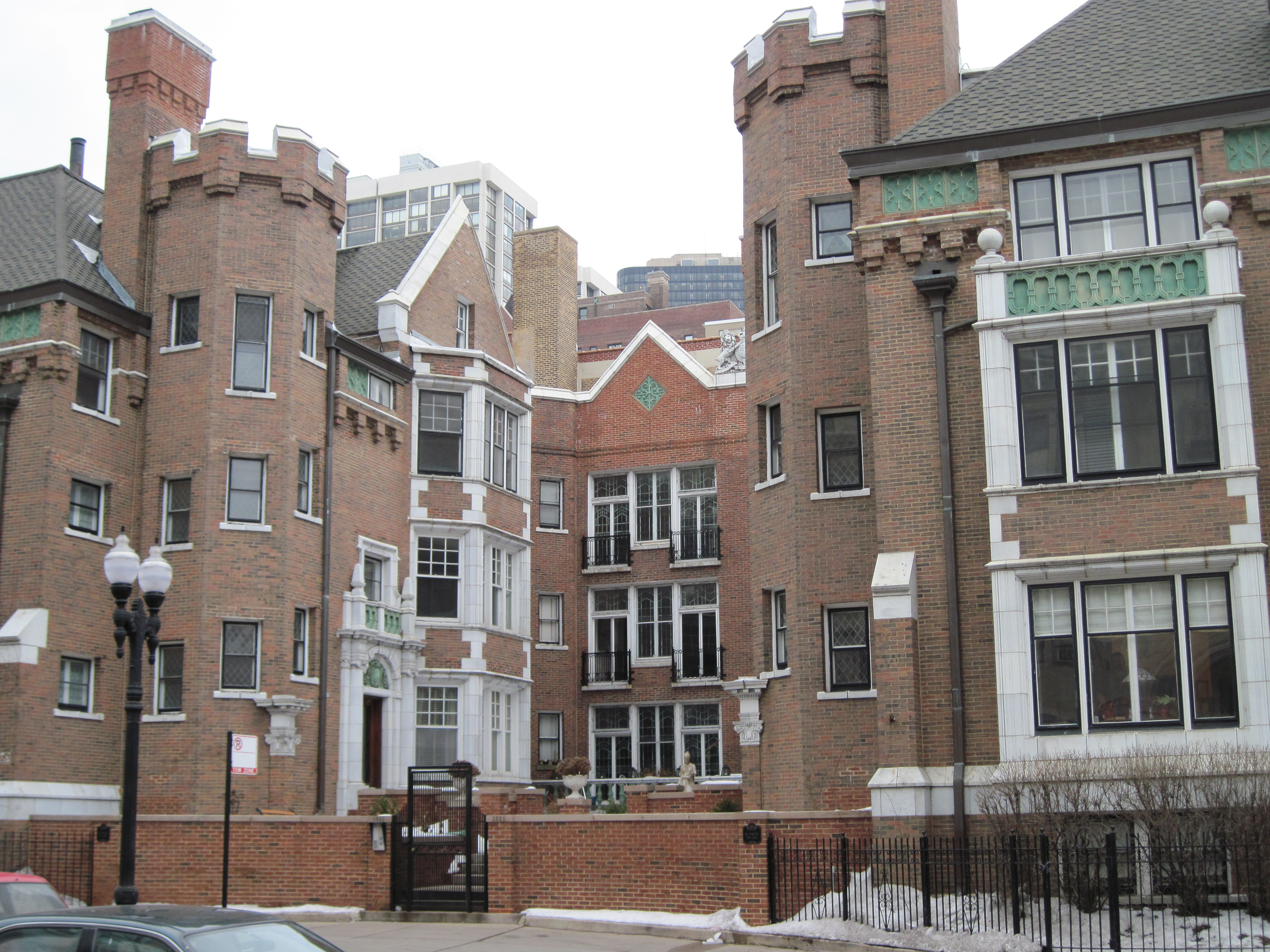

- Location within Chicago metropolitan area Location within Illinois Location within the United States
- Location: Chicago, Illinois
- Coordinates: 41.98342°N 87.65618°W
- Built: 1908; 118 years ago
- Architect: John Edmund Oldaker Pridmore
- Architectural style: Tudor Revival
- Part of: Bryn Mawr Historic District (ID95000482)
- NRHP reference No.: 87001290
- Added to NRHP: August 12, 1987 (Individual); April 20, 1995 (Historic District)

The Manor House is a condominium building in the Edgewater neighborhood of Chicago, Illinois, United States. Completed in 1908, it was designed by architect John Edmund Oldaker Pridmore in the Tudor Revival style. The building is often said to have served as the residence of the British consul in Chicago, though the Edgewater Historical Society has found no evidence supporting this claim.

The Manor House was added to the National Register of Historic Places in 1987. It was later designated a contributing property to the Bryn Mawr Historic District, which was listed on the Register in 1995.
