= International Primary Curriculum =

International education curriculum

- Abbreviation: IPC
- Parent organisation: International Curriculum Association
- Website: www.internationalcurriculum.com

The International Primary Curriculum (IPC) is an independent programme of education for learners aged 5 to 11, cited by The SAGE Handbook of Research in International Education in 2015 as one of the three major international systems of education and one of two identified programmes specifically designed with international education objectives. The IPC forms part of a continuum of curricula, including the International Early Years Curriculum (IEYC) and the International Middle Years Curriculum (IMYC), and was identified as forming a key part of the rise in international education.

== History ==
The curriculum was developed in the late 1990s by a group of international school educators and the support of Shell Oil's international education division and was launched as a standalone international curriculum in 2000.

== Curriculum design ==
From the IPC Curriculum Guide (2020), the design of the IPC cites 7 foundations that present the curriculum as a holistic programme of education for 5-11 year-olds, separated into three 'mileposts' (5–6 years old, 7–9 years old, and 10–11 years old). The 7 foundations are listed as:

- Learner-focused Personal, International and Subject Learning Goals
- A Progressive Pedagogy
- A Process to Facilitate Learning for All
- Globally Competent Learners
- Knowledge, Skills and Understanding are taught, learned and assessed differently
- Connected Learning
- Assessment for Improving Learning

== Thematic units of learning ==
The IPC is presented to schools through a number of thematic units of learning, which bring together the learning of multiple subjects associated with that theme over a 3, 6 or 9 week period. All the units follow the same Process to Facilitate Learning, which has the following stages:

- Entry Point
- Knowledge Harvest
- Explaining the Theme
- Research, Record and Reflect activities
- Exit Point

== Personal learning goals ==
The 8 Personal Learning Goals of the IPC are to become:

- Adaptable
- (a) Communicator
- (a) Collaborator
- Empathetic
- Ethical
- Resilient
- Respectful
- (a) Thinker

== Subject learning goals ==
The subjects included in the IPC subject learning goals are:

- Art
- Design technology and Innovation
- Geography
- Health and Wellbeing
- History
- ICT and Computing
- Language Arts
- Mathematics
- Music
- Physical education
- Science

== Use in schools around the world ==
As of 2021, the IPC is used by over 1,000 international schools in over 90 countries.
