= Chicago Pedway =

System of pedestrian tunnels and walkways in Chicago, Illinois, United States

Coordinates: 41°53′03.2″N 87°37′28.7″W

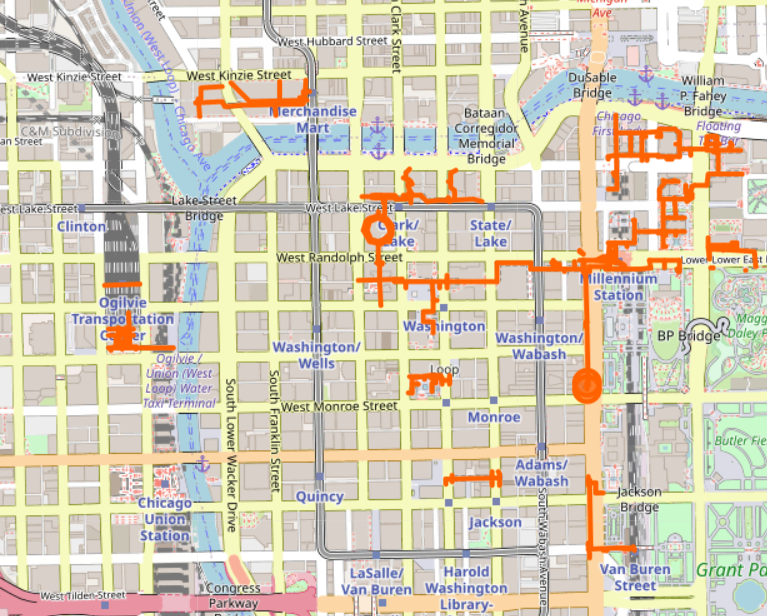
OpenStreetMap map of the Pedway

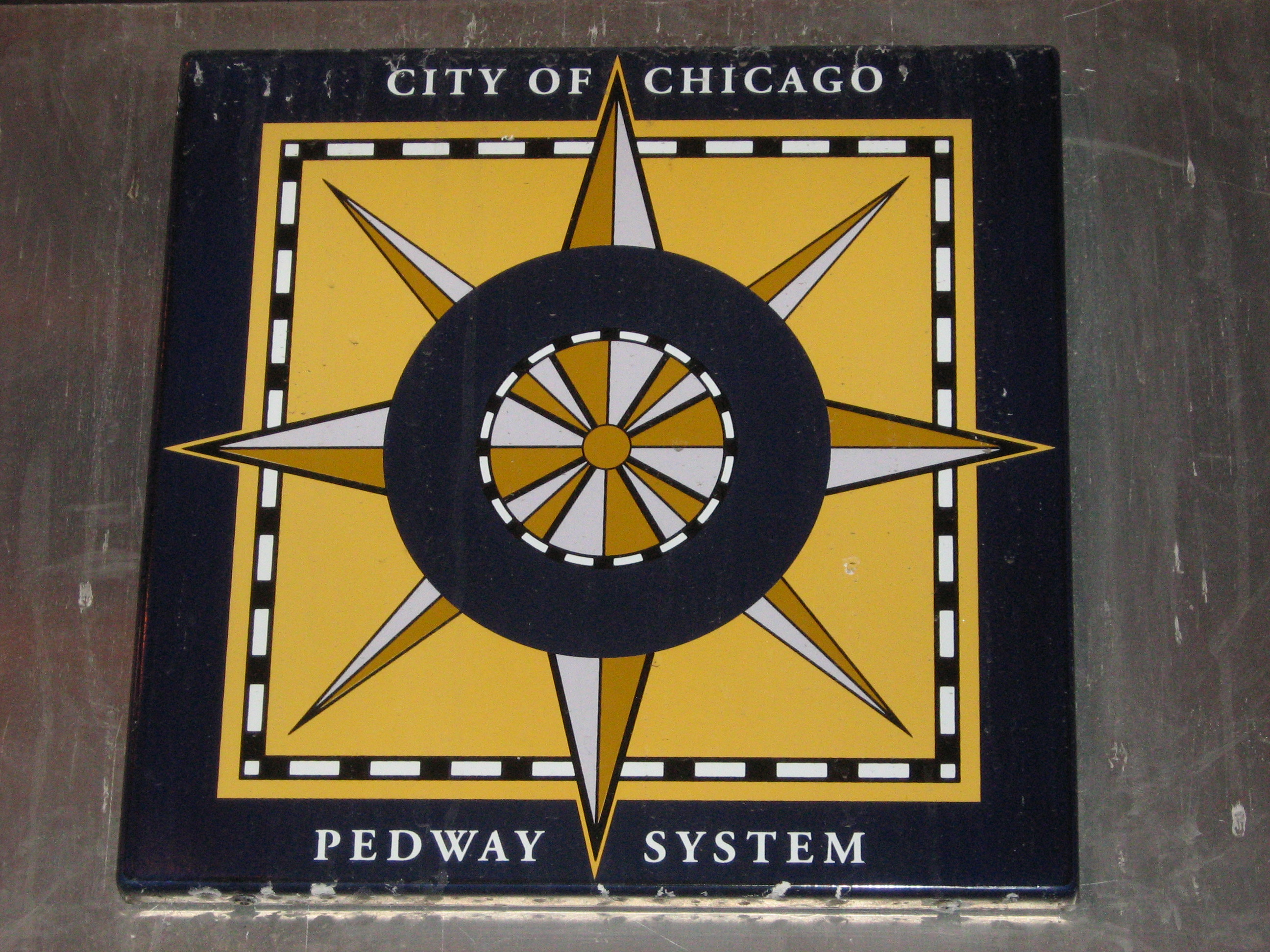
Sign of the Chicago Pedway.

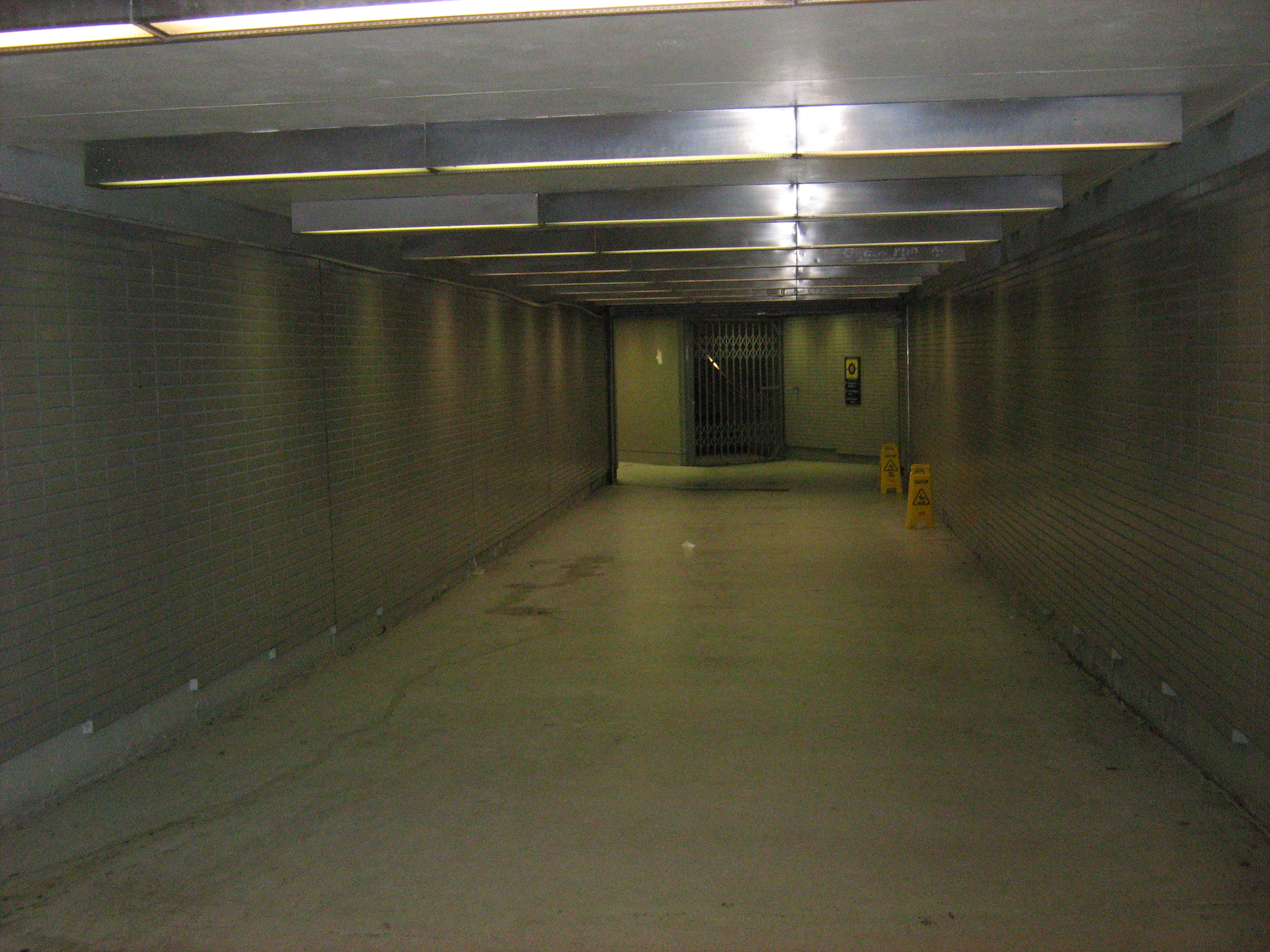
An underground Pedway tunnel

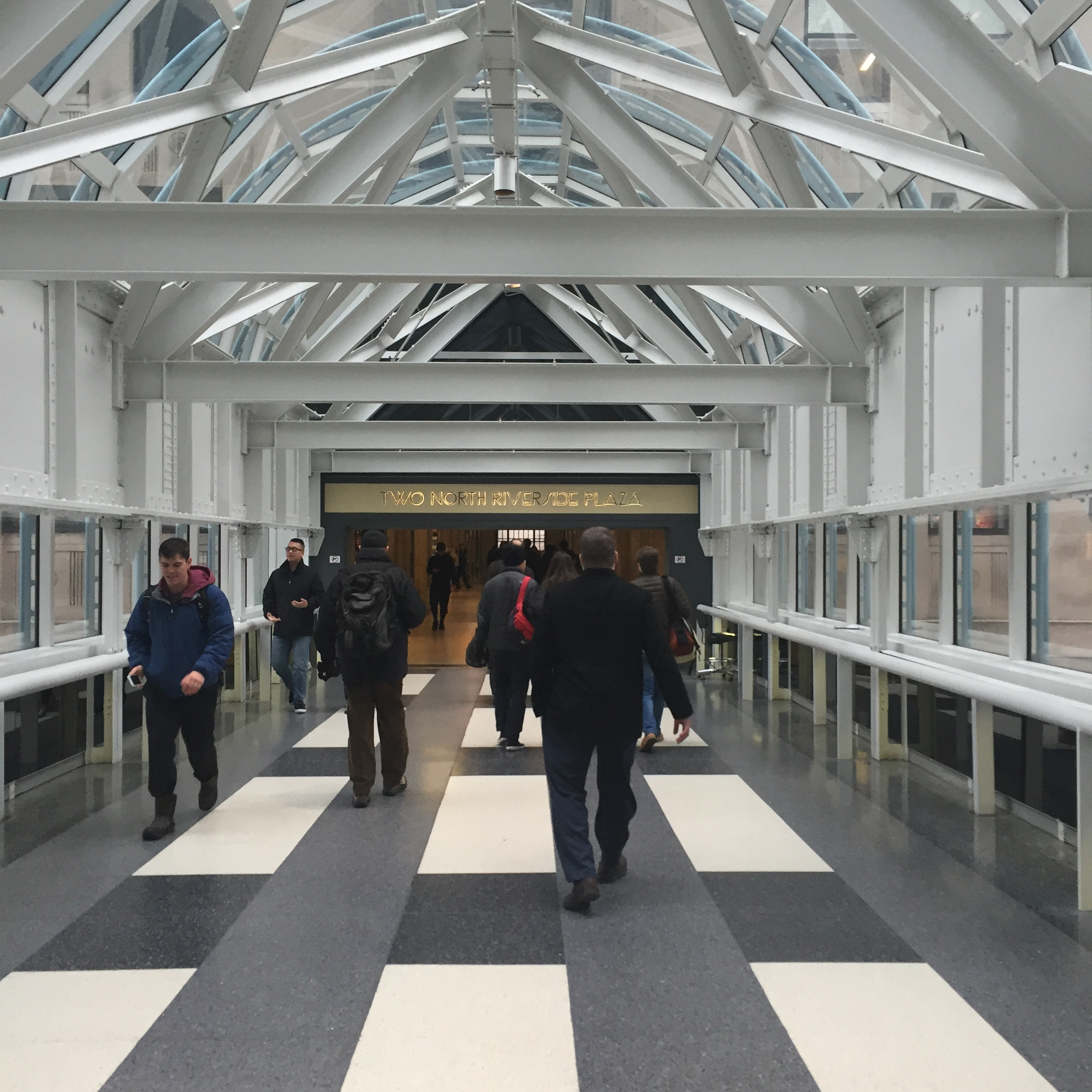
Inside a Pedway bridge between the Ogilvie Transportation Center and 2 North Riverside Plaza

The Chicago Pedway is a network of tunnels, ground-level concourses and bridges in Chicago, Illinois connecting skyscrapers, retail stores, hotels, and train stations throughout the central business district.

With a length of more than 40 downtown blocks, it contains shops, restaurants, and public art and helps pedestrians in inclement weather. Most connections to the pedway are commercial or government buildings, including hotels. Columbus Plaza, The Heritage at Millennium Park, the Park Millennium, 200 North Dearborn Apartments, and Aqua are the only residential buildings connected to the pedway.

== History ==
The oldest portions of the Pedway, aside from the interiors of some included buildings, are the corridors between State and Dearborn Streets, linking Chicago Transit Authority's State Street Subway and Milwaukee–Dearborn Subway stations (part of the modern-day Red Line and Blue Line respectively) at Washington and Lake Streets and at Jackson Street. These were constructed with the subways; while the completion and outfitting of the Milwaukee–Dearborn Subway was interrupted by rationing in World War II, the two mezzanine connector tunnels opened in 1943 and linked the State Street Subway under State Street to the sidewalks of Dearborn Street.

Construction on the pedway proper began in 1951 after the completion of the Milwaukee–Dearborn Subway and has continued since then, especially after expansion was included in both the Transit Planning Study: Chicago Central Area (1968) and the Chicago 21 Plan (1973).

The smaller but more elaborate eastern section of the pedway, connecting the Illinois Center buildings, Hyatt Regency, Fairmont Hotel, Swissôtel, and (later) Aqua, are indirectly accessible from the main (Loop-centric) pedway network, as each is linked to one end of the Metra Electric District rail platforms. Since the Regional Transportation Authority's removal of the turnstiles in November 2003, the two large pedway sections have been united by the platforms.

The southern reach of the main network was reduced when the 2nd floor passage across Madison Street, linking Three First National Plaza with Bank One Plaza (now Chase Tower), was removed after the two buildings restricted public access to upper levels. The tunnels between Chase Tower and Two First National Plaza remain but are closed to the general public. Chase Tower is still connected to the Blue Line subway and to the restaurant structure in the south-west corner of the adjoining Exelon Plaza, and public access is permitted during workday hours.

In December 2013, 22 stained glass panels were installed on the wall opposite the entrance to Macy's food court, in a collaboration with the Smith Museum of Stained Glass Windows; these remain in place, although the museum has closed. The Environmental Law and Policy Center plans to install more art exhibits and a public library as part of a revitalization of the Pedway.

Numerous smaller pedways throughout the central business district are not connected to the main network. These include the tunnel below Quincy Street and the Dirksen Federal Courthouse, connecting the Red and Blue Lines' Jackson Street stations; within and between the Ogilvie Transportation Center and 2 North Riverside Plaza; within and between the Merchandise Mart and Apparel Center; and the passageways under Chase Tower's Exelon Plaza.

== Entrances ==
Points of entry and exit for the Pedway include:

- One North Dearborn Street
- One North State Street
- 2 North Riverside Plaza
- One Prudential Plaza (130 East Randolph Street)
- Two First National Plaza
- Two Prudential Plaza (180 North Stetson Avenue)
- Three First National Plaza (70 West Madison Street)
- 25 East Washington Street
- 77 West Wacker Drive
- 120 North LaSalle
- 139 North Wabash Avenue
- 200 North Dearborn Apartments
- 201 North Clark Street
- 203 North LaSalle Street
- 303 East Wacker Drive
- Aon Center (200 East Randolph Street)
- Aqua and Radisson Blu Hotel
- Block 37 shopping mall at 108 North State Street
- Blue Cross Blue Shield Tower (300 East Randolph Street)
- Boulevard Towers
- Chase Tower
- City Hall-County Building
- Chicago Cultural Center (former main library & GAR memorial)
- Chicago Title and Trust Center (181 North Clark Street)
- Columbus Plaza
- Richard J. Daley Bicentennial Plaza
- Richard J. Daley Center (50 West Washington Street)
- In front of the Dirksen Federal Building (interior not connected) (219 South Dearborn Street)
- George W. Dunne Cook County Administration Building (69 West Washington Street)
- Fairmont Hotel Chicago
- Grant Park underground parking garages
- The Heritage at Millennium Park (130 North Garland Court)
- Hyatt Regency Hotel
- Illinois Center
- Lake CTA Red Line station
- Leo Burnett Building (35 West Wacker Drive)
- Macy's in the Marshall Field and Company Building
- Millennium Park
- Ogilvie Transportation Center (500 West Madison Street)
- Millennium Station (formerly Randolph Street Terminal)
- Park Millennium
- Jay Pritzker Pavilion
- Renaissance Chicago Downtown Hotel (formerly Stouffer Riviere)
- 150 North Michigan Avenue
- The Sporting Club at Illinois Center
- Swissôtel Chicago
- James R. Thompson Center (100 West Randolph Street)
- Union Station
- Washington CTA Blue Line station

== See also ==
- Underground city
- Block 37
- Minneapolis Skyway System
- PATH
- Subterranean New York City
