= Madison Street (Chicago) =

Street in Chicago, Illinois

- 0 North/South; James Madison Street
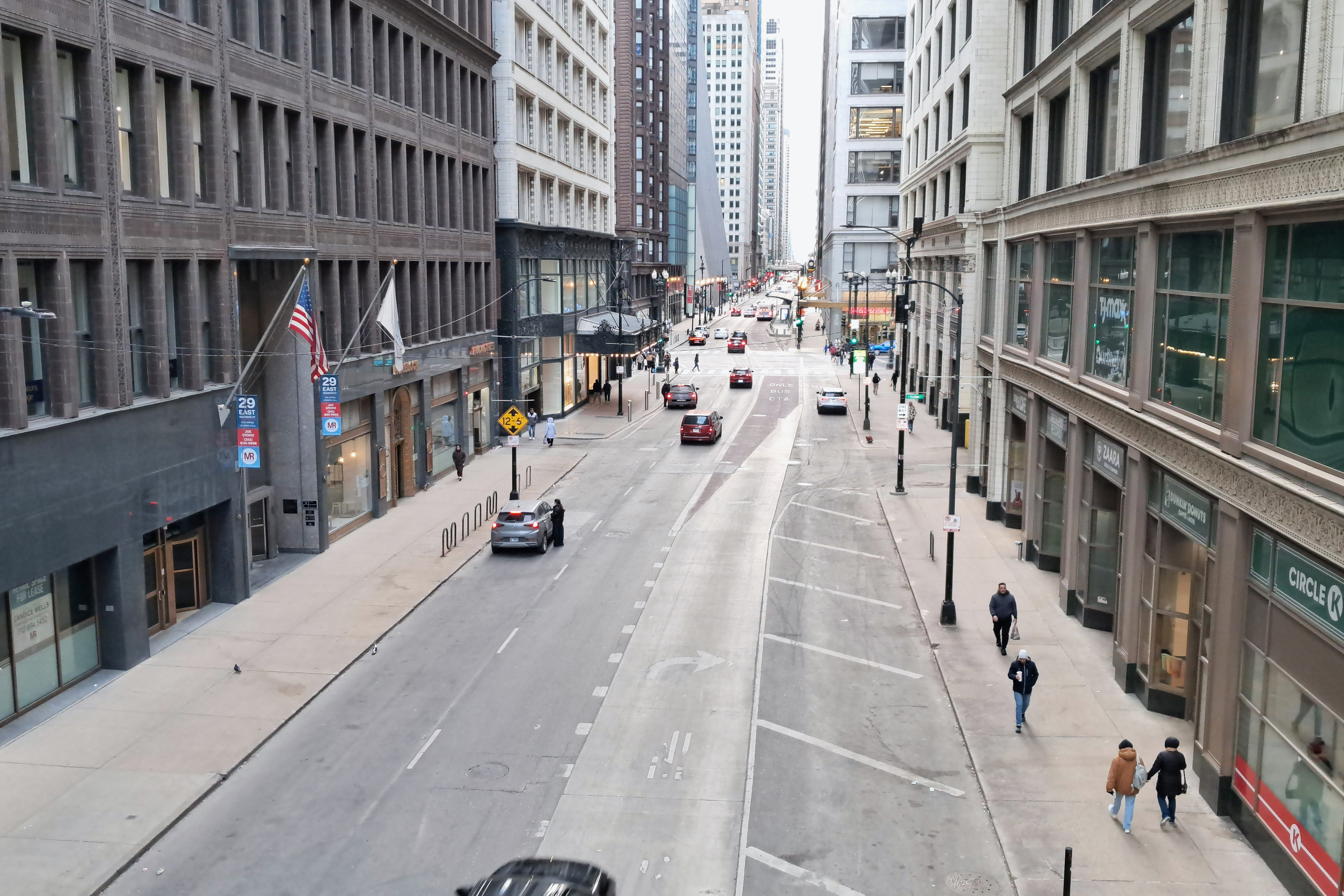
- Madison Street, as viewed from the Washington/Wabash station, March 2026
- Interactive map of Madison Street
- Location: Lombard, Villa Park, Elmhurst, Hillside, Bellwood, Maywood, River Forest, Forest Park, Oak Park, Chicago
- West end: IL 53 (Columbine Avenue) in Lombard
- East end: Michigan Avenue (100 E) Chicago

Madison Street is a major east–west street in Chicago, Illinois. Prior to human intervention, in the early 19th century the Chicago River after forming a large bend emptied into Lake Michigan at the present day intersection of Madison Street and Michigan Avenue. The street was laid out in the first plat of Chicago. Since 1908, it has served as the address origin between North and South on the Chicago street grid.

Notable buildings located along Madison Street include the Carson, Pirie, Scott and Company Building, Chase Tower, Three First National Plaza, the Chicago Civic Opera House, Citigroup Center and the United Center. The West Side's United Center is across Madison Street from the former site of the Chicago Stadium, "the Madhouse on Madison" (demolished in 1995).

== History ==
Per a 1908 decision by Chicago's city council, Madison serves as the north–south dividing line for Chicago's street numbering system, while State Street serves as the east–west line. At one point, the intersection between the two streets was considered the "world's busiest corner."

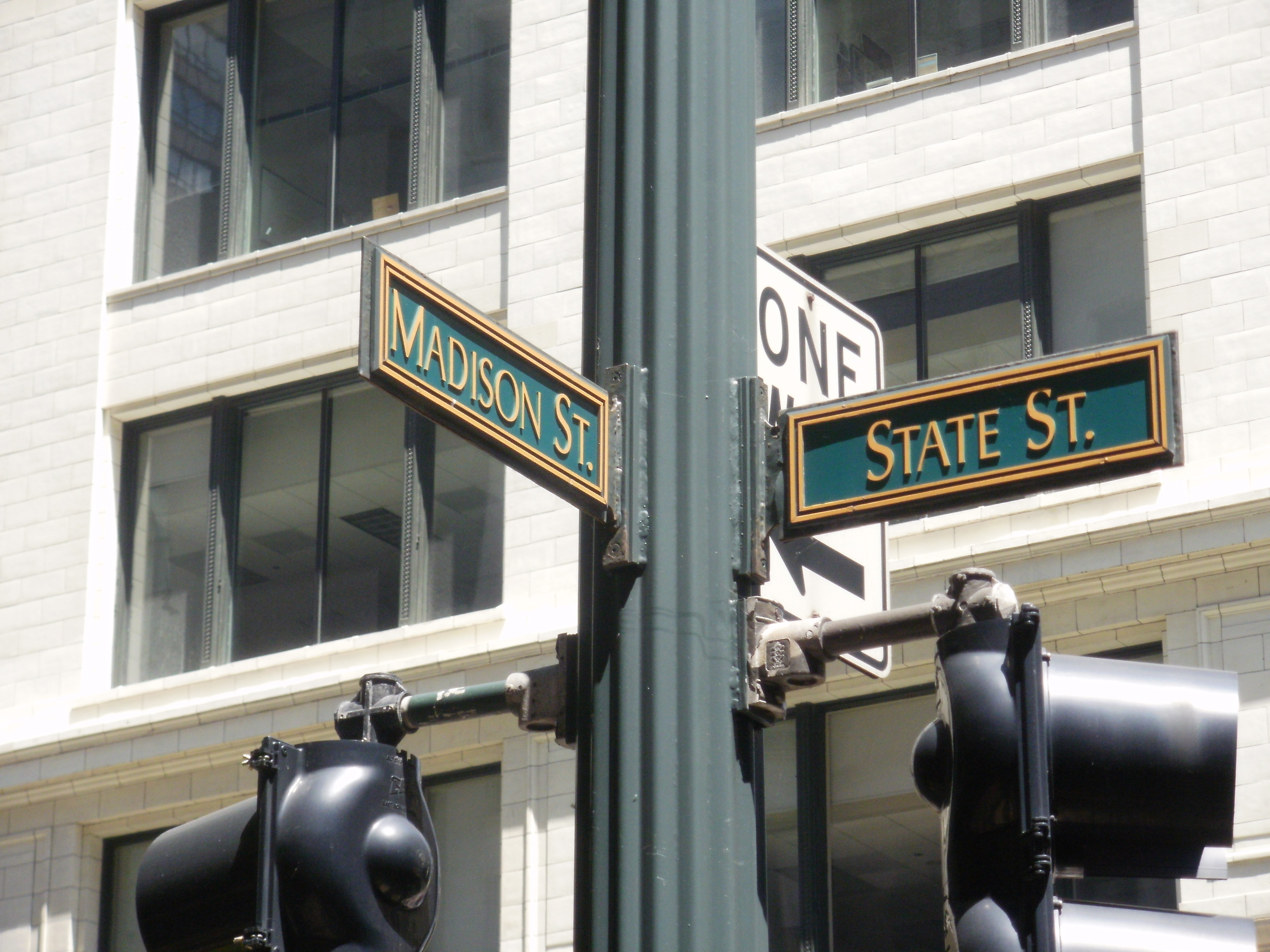
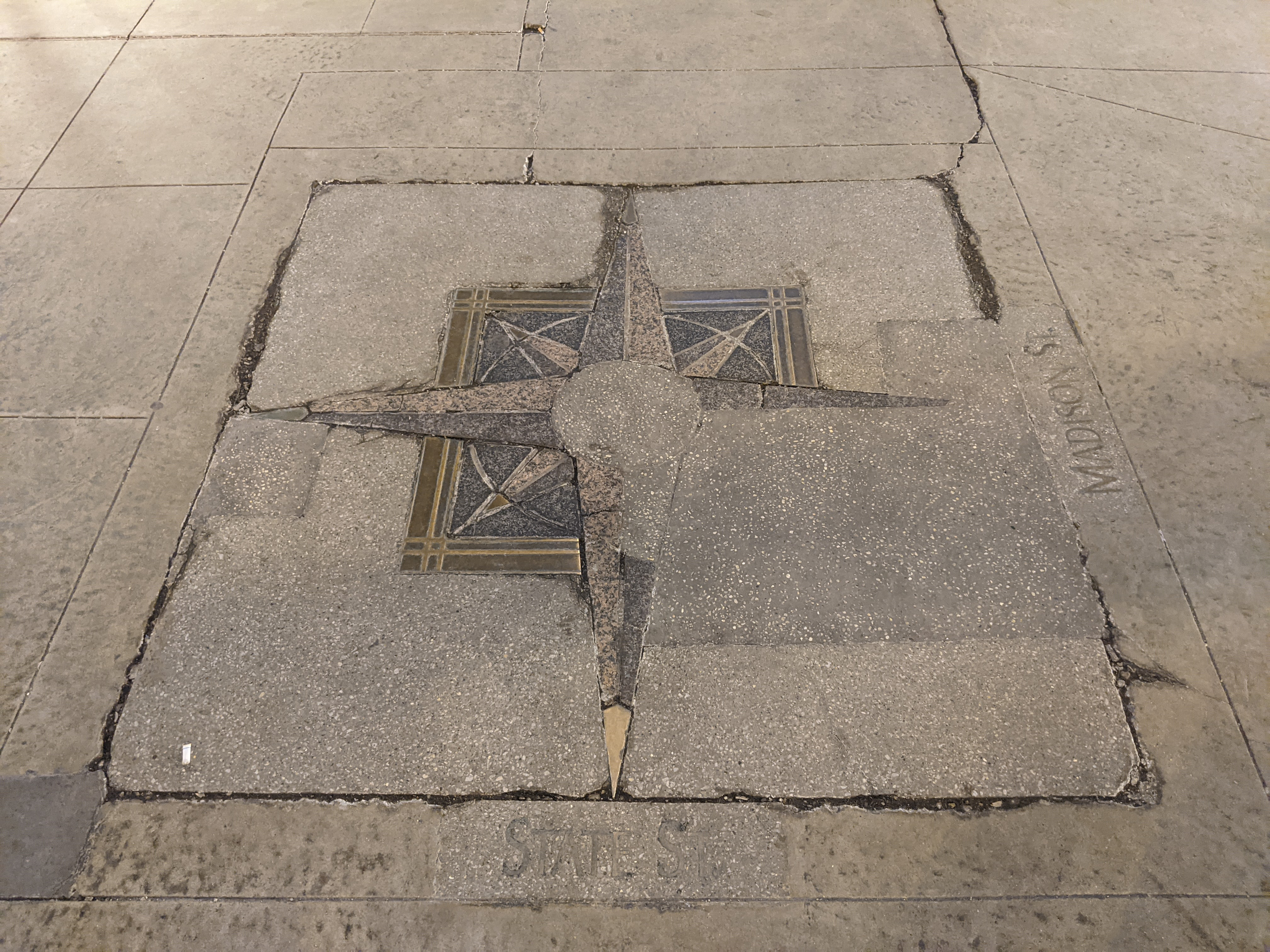
The intersection of Madison Street and State Street is the origin of Chicago's address numbering system.

== Transportation ==
The 20 Madison bus route runs along Madison Street from Austin Boulevard to Michigan Avenue. In downtown, the route runs along the Loop Link, part of which runs along Madison Street.

On the Chicago "L", the Loop Elevated serves Madison Street by two stations: Washington/Wells and Washington/Wabash stations. The street is also served by the Blue Line (via Monroe and Washington) and the Red Line (via Monroe). Historically, Madison was also served by Madison/Wells, Madison/Wabash, Madison, and Washington (Red Line) stations.

Madison Street provides a connection to Ogilvie Transportation Center and Chicago Union Station through Accenture Tower and a stairway connector, respectively. Metra serves both stations; Amtrak only serves the latter station.

=== History ===
State Street at Madison Street, 1897

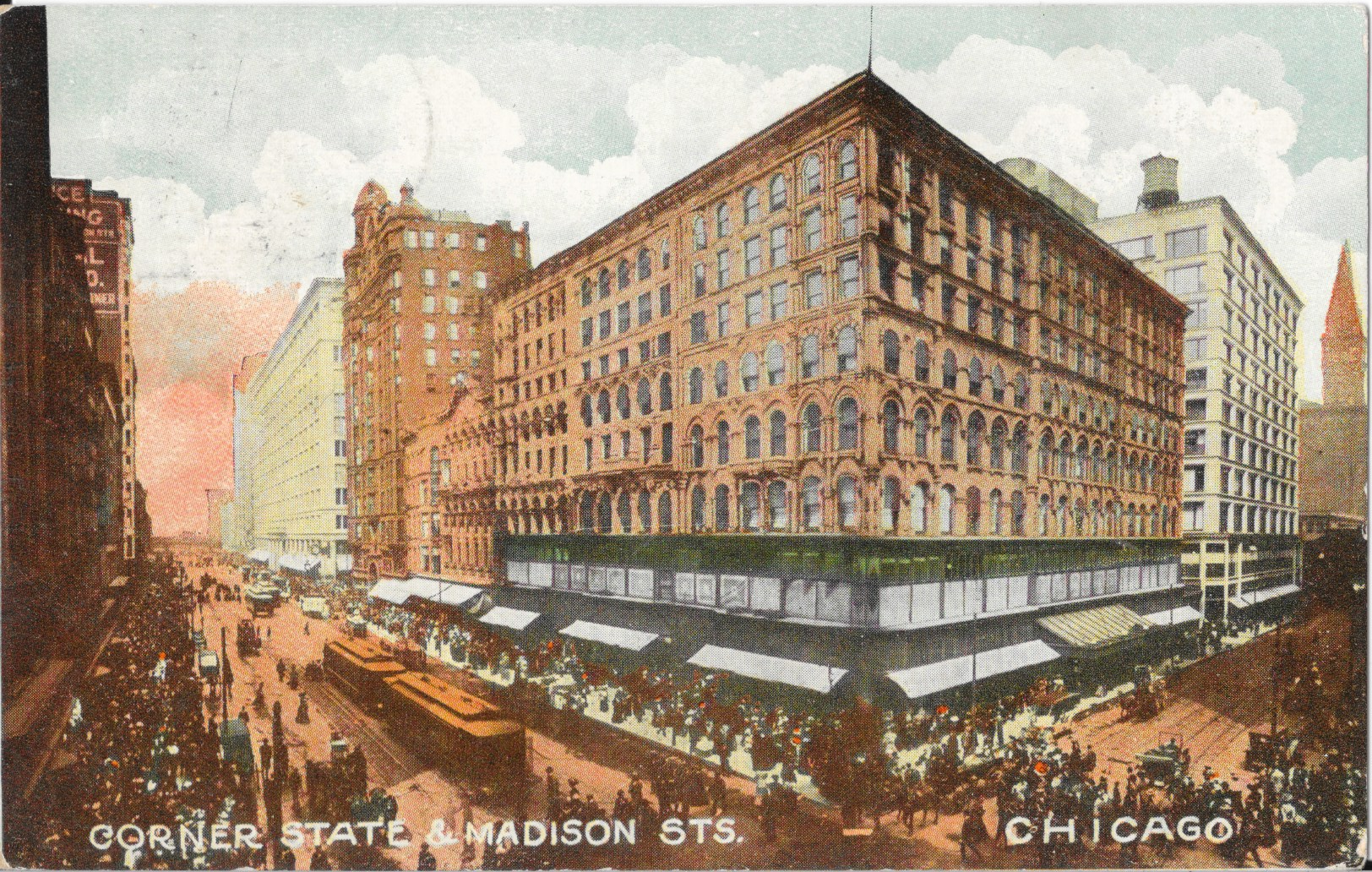
State Street and Madison Street, c. 1911

Madison Street was one of the "Big Five" streetcar lines of Chicago in the early-to-mid 20th century, which carried the most passengers, had the shortest intervals between cars, and had two-car trains in contrast to the typical one-car Chicago streetcar the most often. Madison Street was home to some of the earliest transit in Chicago, having a horse car service starting from 1859. Cable cars operated on the street until they were replaced by streetcars on August 19, 1906. This line was formally codified as Through Route 20 (TR 20) in July 1921. Two-car motor-trailer trains ran on Madison from October 14, 1923, to July 19, 1930; multiple-unit control trains began on an experimental basis on July 13, 1924. A branch line diverging from the main service on Fifth Avenue joined the main line downtown starting August 19, 1906, after having previously been a shuttle; staying a shuttle during the night, it reverted to that status on Sundays starting April 24, 1932. As of 1928, the main line had owl service between 1:01 and 5:20 a.m., during which cars ran for every ten minutes, but the Fifth Avenue branch did not, the last eastbound through-route car departing its western terminus of Crawford Avenue at 12:40 a.m. and the last westbound shuttle departing Madison at 2:00 a.m.; during the day, streetcar lines in Chicago typically had intervals of between eight and fifteen minutes. Buses replaced main line streetcars on weekends starting May 11, 1952 – simultaneous with the Fifth Avenue branch's replacement by buses on Saturdays – and altogether on December 13, 1953, whereupon the Fifth Avenue branch became a shuttle service at all times before it too was discontinued on February 22, 1954.

== Works cited ==
- Lind, Alan R. (1974). Chicago Surface Lines: An Illustrated History. Park Forest, Illinois: Transport History Press.
