= Jackson station (CTA Red Line) =

Chicago "L" station

Jackson 300S 0E/0W
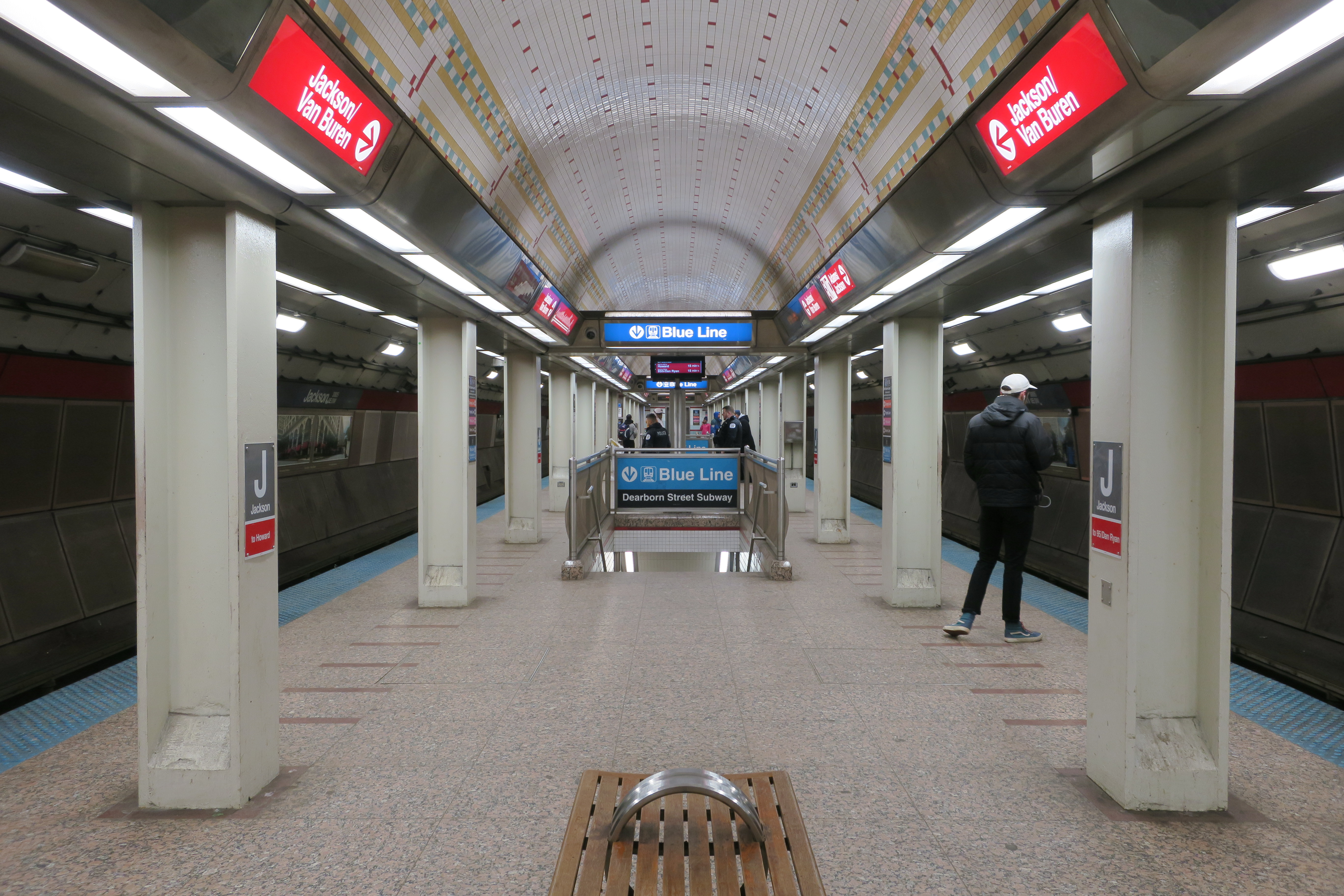
- Station platform with stairs to the Blue Line station.

General information
- Location: 230 South State Street; Chicago, Illinois 60604
- Coordinates: 41.878153°N 87.627596°W
- Owner: City of Chicago
- Line: State Street subway
- Platforms: 1 island platform
- Tracks: 2
- Connections: Blue at Jackson; Brown Orange Purple Pink at Library

Construction
- Structure type: Subway
- Depth: 35 feet (11 m)
- Cycle facilities: Yes
- Accessible: Yes

History
- Opened: October 17, 1943; 82 years ago
- Rebuilt: 1989–91 (Adams–Jackson mezzanine); 1996–2000 (Jackson–Van Buren mezzanine); 2002–04 (platform)

Passengers
- 2025: 1,374,646 ▲7.6%

Services
Preceding station	Chicago "L"	Following station
Monroe toward Howard	Red Line	Harrison toward 95th/Dan Ryan
Track layout
Location

Jackson is an "L" station on the CTA's Red Line in the Loop. Free transfers to Blue Line trains are available at this station via a lower level transfer tunnel to the Jackson station in the Milwaukee–Dearborn subway and farecard transfers to Purple, Orange, Brown and Pink Line trains are available via the Harold Washington Library–State/Van Buren Loop Elevated station.

Like the Washington station, the northern extension of which was reconfigured as the Lake station, Jackson was originally double-length, with a third station mezzanine at Van Buren Street and Congress Parkway. The Van Buren-Congress mezzanine closed on January 6, 1984, following the closure of the South Loop's main anchor, Sears, which had a direct entrance from the mezzanine. At the same time, the south end of the Jackson platform beyond the Jackson-Van Buren mezzanine was closed off with a plywood wall and both the platform area and mezzanine now remain, but abandoned. The street level entrances to the Van Buren-Congress mezzanine were removed when State Street was remodeled in 1997, replaced with access through grates, which can be seen on the sidewalks between Van Buren Street and Ida B. Wells Drive.

The accessible entrance is located on the west side of State Street between Jackson & Adams, just south of 220 State Street.

== Bus connections ==
CTA

- 1 Bronzeville/Union Station (weekday rush hours only)
- 2 Hyde Park Express (weekday rush hours only)
- 6 Jackson Park Express
- 7 Harrison
- 10 Obama Presidential Center/Museum of Science and Industry Express
- 29 State
- 36 Broadway
- 62 Archer (Owl Service)
- 126 Jackson
- 146 Inner Lake Shore/Michigan Express
- 147 Outer DuSable Lake Shore Express
- 151 Sheridan
