= Proposed expansion of the Chicago "L" =

Rapid transit system studies in Chicago

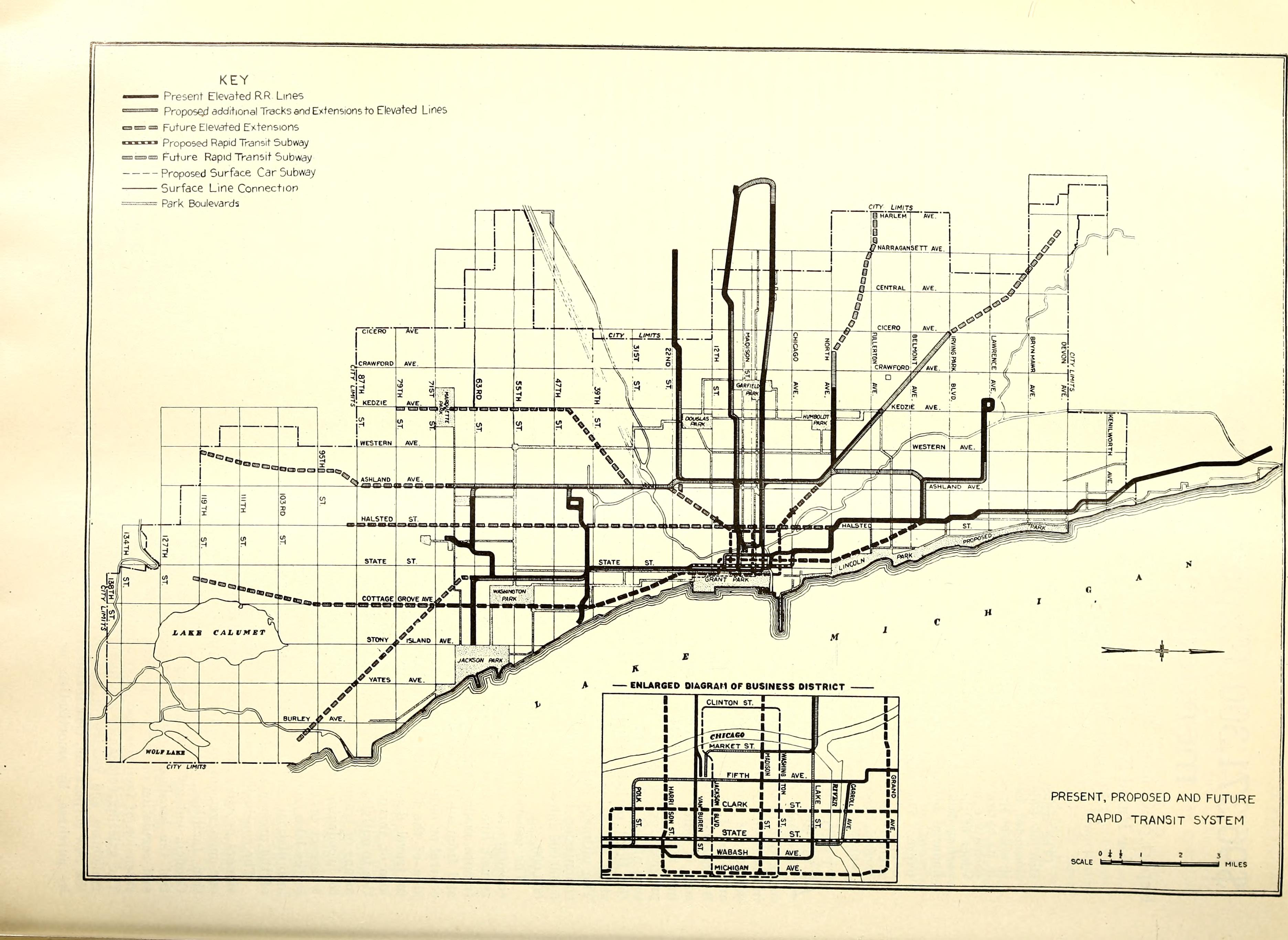
Map showing then-current and proposed "L" lines, 1916

Since the inception of the Chicago "L" in 1892, various planning organizations have developed master plans to expand or reorganize the "L". Throughout the mid-20th century, plans were made to demolish the Loop Elevated for a series of downtown subway lines. Since its creation in 1955, the Chicago Area Transportation Study (CATS), now the Chicago Metropolitan Agency for Planning (CMAP) after the 2006 merger, has developed transportation plans spanning the Chicago metropolitan area, such as public transit expansions.

== Early 20th century plans ==
The Burnham Plan of Chicago in 1909 conceived many urban planning proposals to improve Chicago's infrastructure and quality of life. Among other proposals, the Burnham Plan recommended expanding the city's rapid transit system through subway and elevated lines, but the plan offered little details on each of the proposed routes.

On May 9, 1911, a municipal subway commission was established by Peter Reinberg, the alderman who chaired the Committee on Local Transportation, at the request of Mayor Carter Harrison IV. Subsequently, the Joint Report on Comprehensive System of Passenger Subways for the City of Chicago, published on September 10, 1912, by the Harbor and Subway Commission, was the first municipal plan to develop underground subway lines in Chicago. A similar municipal commission established in 1915, the Traction and Subway Commission, proposed a general expansion of the Chicago "L", including the development of subway lines, and the municipalization of the "L". The recommendations from the 1915 commission culminated in the Report of the Chicago Traction and Subway Commission in 1916.

In response to growing transportation demand, Rudolph F. Kelker, Jr., an engineer working with the Committee on Local Transportation, published the Report and Recommendations on a Physical Plan for a Unified Transportation System for the City of Chicago in 1923. The plan was larger in scope than the previous plans, proposing the unification of urban transit systems (rapid transit and on-street transit) alongside the addition of new subway and elevated lines.

Similar aspirations were present in two subsequent plans in 1927 and 1930.

A Comprehensive Local Transportation Plan for the City of Chicago was published in 1937 in response to the Great Depression and the growing number of automobile registrations. The plan proposed a subway line under State Street as well as the demolition of the Loop Elevated. The plan also proposed replacing elevated lines (Douglas Park, Lake Street, and Logan Square branches) with elevated highways and replacing "L" stations on these lines with bus stations.

== 1939 Comprehensive Plan ==
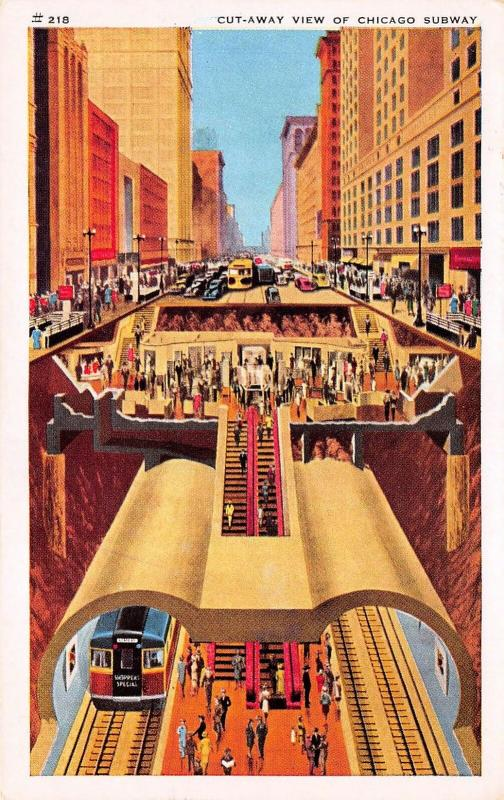
Postcard of the State Street subway (c. 1943)

The Chicago Department of Subways and Superhighways published the Comprehensive Plan for the Extension of the Subway System of the City of Chicago in 1939. Much like the 1937 plan, the 1939 plan proposed replacing the Loop Elevated with a series of underground lines. The plan was divided into four stages.

=== Initial System of Subways (First Stage) ===
In 1937, the City of Chicago applied for federal loan and grant from the Public Works Administration (PWA) for the construction of the State Street subway as well as two east–west underground streetcar lines. However, Harold L. Ickes, the director of the PWA, rejected the streetcar lines in favor of a second rapid transit subway line. The city ultimately caved in to Ickes's demand. In 1938, federal approval was given to fund the city's Initial System of Subways, which comprised the State Street subway and the Milwaukee–Dearborn subway.

By the time the 1939 plan was published, the first stage was reserved for the Initial System of Subways.

State Street subway
4.41 miles (7.10 km), $25.75 million
The subway line was planned to run below Clybourn Avenue, Division Street, and State Street. Construction began on December 17, 1938, and the line opened on October 17, 1943.
Milwaukee–Dearborn subway
3.29 miles (5.29 km), $19.85 million
The subway line was planned to run below Milwaukee Avenue, Lake Street, Dearborn Street, and Congress Street from Evergreen Avenue to LaSalle Street. Construction began in March 1939, but work was suspended between 1942 and 1945 due to material rationing during World War II. Construction resumed in 1945, and the line opened on February 25, 1951.

=== Subsequent stages ===
Beyond First Stage, lines in each successive stage were given lower priority and urgency. The Loop Elevated would have been dismantled after the Second and Third stages. A series of east–west streetcar lines along downtown surface streets would have also been dismantled after the Second Stage. (Note: Although the Second Stage was never fully implemented, streetcars were entirely phased out for buses by June 21, 1958.)

Line	Roads	From	To	Route miles	Cost (1939)	Notes
Second Stage
Congress Street subway	Congress Street	Metropolitan main line near Halsted Street	Dearborn subway at LaSalle Street	0.90 miles (1.45 km)	$7.3 million	Subway; later became the West Side Subway (see § New Horizons plan (1958))
Lake Street subway	Lake Street	Lake Street Elevated near Racine Avenue	Dearborn subway	0.75 miles (1.21 km)	$4.4 million	Subway
Washington Street subway	Washington Street	Clinton Street	Terminal loop east of Michigan Avenue	0.95 miles (1.53 km)	$5.4 million	Streetcar subway; the line would incorporate the Washington Street Tunnel
Jackson Street subway	Jackson Boulevard	Clinton Street	Terminal loop east of Michigan Avenue	1.00 mile (1.61 km)	$6.3 million	Streetcar subway; the line would incorporate the Van Buren Street Tunnel
Third Stage
Wells–Archer–Ashland subway	Wells Street, Archer Avenue, and Ashland Avenue	North Side main line north of Chicago Avenue	79th Street at Ashland Avenue	11.20 miles (18.02 km)	$59.2 million	Subway
14th Street Connection	14th Street and State Street	Wells Street subway at 14th Street	State Street subway south of Roosevelt Road	0.61 miles (0.98 km)	$3.6 million	Subway
Milwaukee Avenue subway extension	Milwaukee Avenue	Foster Avenue at Milwaukee Avenue	Logan Square branch near Logan Square station	4.65 miles (7.48 km)	$22.2 million	Subway
Douglas Park subway	Blue Island Avenue	Douglas branch near Wood Street	Congress Street subway near Desplaines Street	2.34 miles (3.77 km)	$11.0 million	Subway
Fourth Stage
South Park Avenue subway	South Park Avenue	Jackson Park branch west of South Park Avenue	79th Street at South Park Avenue	2.00 miles (3.22 km)	$10.1 million	Subway
Archer–Cicero subway	Archer Avenue and Cicero Avenue	63rd Street at Cicero Avenue	Wells–Archer–Ashland subway at Ashland Avenue	6.12 miles (9.85 km)	$29.6 million	Subway
North Avenue subway	North Avenue	Central Avenue at North Avenue	Humboldt Park branch at Lawndale Avenue	3.09 miles (4.97 km)	$15.9 million	Subway
Belmont Avenue subway	Belmont Avenue	Oak Park Avenue at Belmont Avenue	Milwaukee Avenue subway extension at Belmont Avenue	3.31 miles (5.33 km)	$17.3 million	Subway
Milwaukee Avenue express subway	Milwaukee Avenue	Milwaukee Avenue subway extension at Logan Square	Milwaukee–Dearborn subway at Ashland Avenue and Division Street	1.30 miles (2.09 km)	$6.2 million	Subway
Crosstown subways		Ravenswood branch near Roscoe Street	Ashland Avenue subway at Archer Avenue	4.20 miles (6.76 km)	$21.2 million	Subway; would incorporate the north–south segments of the Douglas and Logan Square branches
Michigan Avenue subway	Michigan Avenue	Randolph Street at Michigan Avenue	Van Buren Street at Michigan Avenue	0.38 miles (0.61 km)	$1.7 million	Streetcar subway

== New Horizons plan (1958) ==
The Chicago Transit Authority (CTA) published the New Horizons for Chicago's Metropolitan Area in January 1958. The 20-year plan was anticipated to cost $315 million (equivalent to $3.73 billion in 2025).

=== Proposed extensions ===
One of the lines listed in the New Horizons plan was the West Side Subway, a rapid transit line that would run along the Congress Expressway. The line was intended to replace the Garfield Park branch. Construction on the expressway, which accompanied the transit line, began in 1949. The initial section of the line opened on June 22, 1958, and the final section opened on March 20, 1960.

Two additional lines that were eventually built in principle were the Northwest Rapid Transit and the South Side Rapid Transit.

The Northwest Rapid Transit was planned to branch north from the Logan Square branch along the previous alignment of the proposed Crosstown Expressway between Talman Avenue and Rockwell Street. The line would then run northwest along the median of the Northwest Expressway from Talman Avenue to the city limit of Chicago, with an eventual extension to O'Hare International Airport. The line opened to Jefferson Park on February 1, 1970, but the north–south section was routed below Kimball Avenue. On February 27, 1983, the line was extended to River Road; on September 3, 1984, the line was further extended to O'Hare station in the eponymous airport.

The South Side Rapid Transit was planned to travel along the median of the South Expressway between 30th and 95th streets. South of 95th Street, the line would be divided into two branches: the eastern branch to 103rd Street along the Calumet Expressway and the western branch to 119th Street along today's I-57. A connector ramp to the Englewood branch at 59th Street was also proposed. The line opened on September 28, 1969, but the connector ramp and the segments south of 95th Street were not built.

Line	Roads	From	To	Cost (1958)	Notes
West Side Subway	Congress Expressway	Desplaines Avenue	Milwaukee–Dearborn subway at LaSalle Street	$27.00 million	Expressway-median line
Northwest Rapid Transit	Northwest Expressway	Canfield Avenue	Logan Square branch between Talman Avenue and Rockwell Street	$31.00 million	Expressway-median line
South Side Rapid Transit	South Expressway, Calumet Expressway, and today's I-57	State Street and Wells Street subways	119th Street (Blue Island branch) 103rd Street and Doty Avenue (Calumet branch)	$31.75 million	Expressway-median line
Southwest Rapid Transit	Southwest Expressway	Cicero Avenue	Halsted Street	$7.00 million	Expressway-median bus rapid transit line
Wells Street Subway	Wells Street	North Side main line north of Chicago Avenue	South Side Rapid Transit	$25.00 million	Subway
Jackson Boulevard Subway	Jackson Boulevard	West Side Subway near Halsted Street	Terminal loop east of Michigan Avenue	$20.00 million	Subway
Washington Street Subway	Washington Street	Canal Street	Michigan Avenue	$15.00 million	Underground bus rapid transit line
Lake Street Routing via West Side Subway	Belt Railway of Chicago	Lake Street Elevated	West Side Subway	$3.50 million	
Englewood Clearing Extension	63rd Street	Cicero Avenue	Englewood branch at Loomis Street	$20.50 million	
California–Western Rapid Transit	Crosstown Expressway (proposed)	Northwest Rapid Transit	Englewood Clearing Extension	$14.00 million	Expressway-median line

=== Proposed modernizations ===
The New Horizons plan also proposed modernizations of transit infrastructure. Under the plan, signaling control systems would be expanded to uncovered areas ($28.00 million), 31 sharp curves would be straightened ($6.40 million), and 27 substations would be automated ($23.1525 million). The plan additionally called for the grade separation of the at-grade segments of the Douglas Park branch ($20.00 million), the Lake Street Elevated ($4.00 million), and the Ravenswood branch ($4.75 million). The Douglas Park branch was also planned to be extended to Harlem Avenue. Ultimately, only the grade separation of the Lake Street Elevated (between Harlem Avenue and Laramie Avenue) materialized, which entered service on October 28, 1962.

The following stations were listed for modernization.

- Loomis station ($33,000), which was already modernized with the implementation of a speed ramp from 1956 to 1964
- Randolph/Wabash station ($40,000), which was already modernized in 1957
- Wilson station ($1.80 million), which was being rebuilt from 1956 to 1960 to accommodate four tracks (the station previously had two through tracks, which bottlenecked train operations)
- Forest Park Terminal ($4.00 million)
- Logan Square Terminal ($75,000)
- Howard Street Terminal ($500,000)
- Kimball Terminal ($350,000)

== Downtown subway plans (1960s–1970s) ==
=== 1962 plan ===
The CTA published a plan in 1962 proposing the following rapid transit lines:

- A subway loop below LaSalle Street, Randolph Street, Jackson Boulevard, and Grant Park; the loop was planned to replace its elevated counterpart.
- A rail line to McCormick Place
- A rail line below Clinton Street, running from the Congress branch at Halsted Street to the Milwaukee–Dearborn subway at Lake Street.
- A rail line along the Dan Ryan Expressway (the expressway was finished that same year); see § New Horizons plan (1958).

=== Chicago Central Area Transit Plan ===
The Chicago Central Area Transit Plan was first published in April 1968 as a continuation of the previous 1962 plan. Like the previous plan, the rationale was to remove the Loop Elevated for a series of subway lines totaling 15 miles (24 km). In April 1970, the City of Chicago established the Chicago Urban Transportation District to implement the plan, including imposing taxes. The following lines were proposed:

Loop Subway
The subway was planned to run below Franklin Street, Randolph Street, Wabash Avenue, and Van Buren Street, at a deeper level than the State Street and Milwaukee–Dearborn subways. The subway would have replaced the Loop Elevated.
Franklin Street Subway
The subway was planned to run from the North Side main line near North Avenue to the Dan Ryan line (under construction as of 1968) at Cermak Road via the following streets: Clybourn Avenue, Orleans Street, Franklin Street (running concurrently along the proposed Loop Subway), and the proposed Franklin Street Connector. In 1974, the proposed route was realigned to travel along Larrabee Street and Kingsbury Street.
Randolph Street Subway
The subway was planned to run from the Lake Street Elevated near Ashland Avenue to the northwest corner of the proposed Loop Subway via Randolph Street.
Monroe Street Distributor
The subway was planned to run from Harrison Street to Grant Park via Morgan Street and Monroe Street. At the lakefront, the Distributor would be split into two north–south segments, utilizing the right of way of the Illinois Central Railroad commuter rail line. The northern segment would run along the commuter line and Fairbanks Court before looping back along Dewitt Place, Walton Place, Rush Street, and Chicago Avenue. The southern segment would run entirely along the commuter line before ending at McCormick Place.

Construction was originally scheduled to begin in 1969 at the cost of $478 million. However, the project faced multiple delays, cost overruns, and scope reductions throughout the 1970s. In 1971, the project cost rose to $750 million. In 1974, the cost rose even further to $1.6 billion.

In an effort to reduce cost, in 1974, the project was divided into two stages: the higher-priority Core Plan and the Balance of the Project. The Core Plan comprised the Franklin Street Subway, the Monroe Street Distributor southwest of the Illinois Center development, and the western portion of the Randolph Street Subway. The Balance of the Project comprised the rest of the planned subway segments. By 1977, the project scope was further reduced to just the Franklin Street Subway, which itself costed $496 million. The southern end of the subway was modified to provide direct connections to the South Side Elevated and the Dan Ryan branch. Construction for the subway was slated to occur from 1979 to 1983.

In June 1979, Mayor Jane Byrne and Governor Jim Thompson canceled the Transit Plan alongside another project to build the Crosstown Expressway. The funds used for both projects were reallocated to other transportation projects, including rapid transit expansions to O'Hare and Midway airports.

== Contemporary plans ==
In 1955, the governments of Chicago, Cook County, and Illinois formed a metropolitan planning organization named the Chicago Area Transportation Study (CATS). CATS published its first finalized report in three volumes: the first volume in 1959, the second volume in 1960, and the third volume in 1962.

Beginning in 1973, CATS published a series of transportation planning reports that envisioned what the Chicago area's transportation system might look like in a few decades. In 2006, in accordance with the enactment of the 2005 Regional Planning Act, the Chicago Metropolitan Agency for Planning was formed as a merger of CATS and the Northeastern Illinois Planning Commission (NIPC). The following reports were published:

- The 1995 Transportation System Plan (1973), which was also authored by the Northwestern Indiana Regional Planning Commission
- The Year 2000 Transportation System Development Plan (1980)
- The Year 2010 Transportation System Development Plan (1990), which was also authored by the NIPC
- The 2020 Regional Transportation Plan (1998), also known as Destination 2020
- The 2030 Regional Transportation Plan for Northeastern Illinois (2003)
- GO TO 2040 Comprehensive Regional Plan (2010)
- ON TO 2050 Comprehensive Plan (2018)

=== Active or completed proposals ===
==== O'Hare Extension ====
The extension of the Milwaukee service to O'Hare Airport appeared in the 1995 Transportation System Plan and the Year 2000 Transportation System Development Plan. The extension opened on February 27, 1983, to River Road and on September 3, 1984, to O'Hare station.

==== Dan Ryan branch–State Street subway connection ====
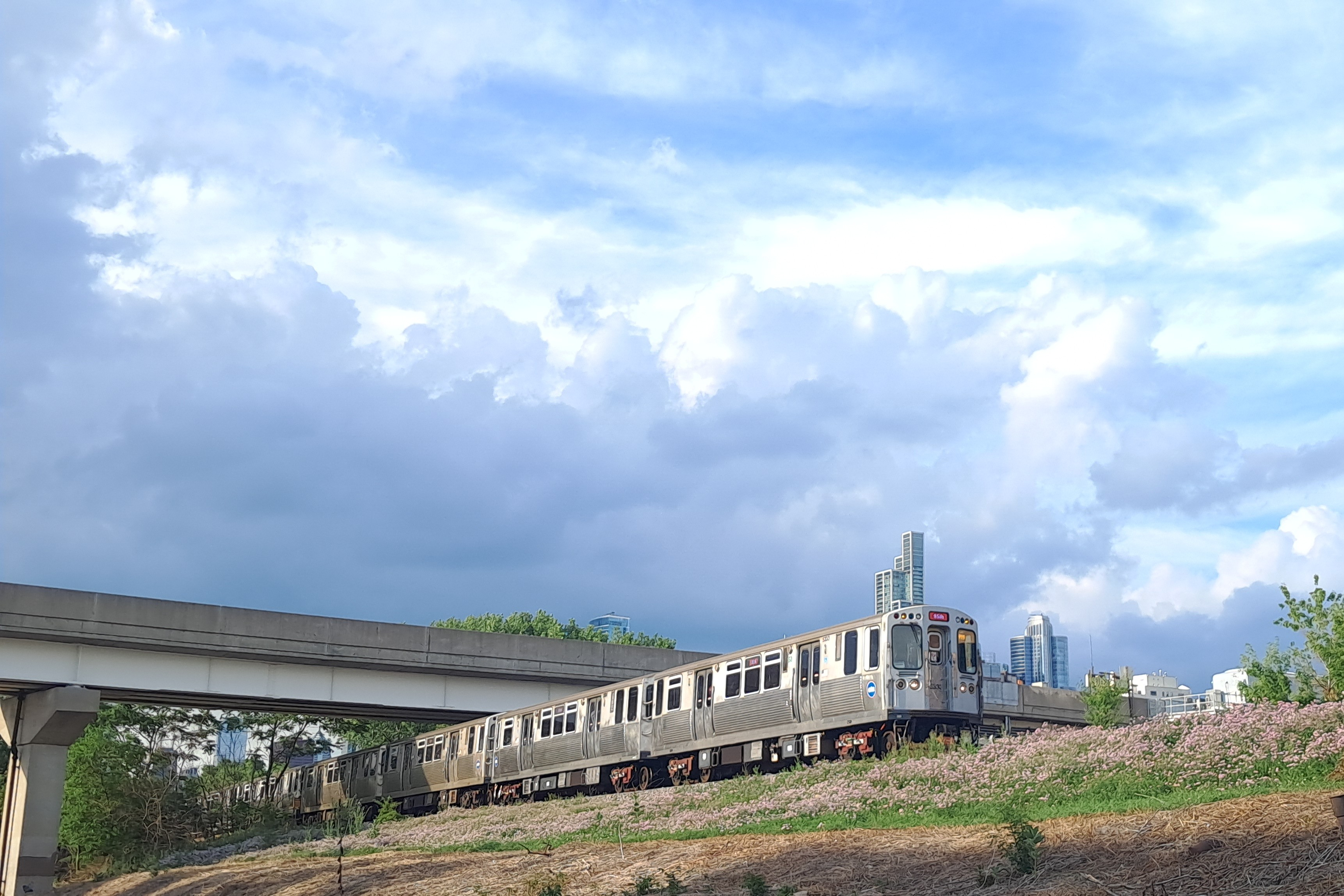
The Orange Line crossing over the Red Line

A proposal to directly link the Dan Ryan branch to the State Street subway appeared in the Year 2000 Transportation System Development Plan.

The subway connection opened on February 21, 1993. Subsequently, Dan Ryan trains began to enter the State Street subway (becoming the Red Line), while South Side Elevated trains began to stay on the South Side Elevated toward the Loop (becoming the Green Line). This service realignment also led to other "L" services being color-coded.

==== Midway Line ====
There had been various proposals to extend "L" service to Midway International Airport. The 1939 plan proposed the Archer–Cicero subway, which would have provided service to the previously named Municipal Airport. The 1958 New Horizons plan and the 1973 plan proposed extending the Englewood branch to Midway Airport at Cicero Avenue. For lines that would run directly southwest, the New Horizons plan called for a busway along today's Stevenson Expressway (from Cicero Avenue to Halsted Street), and the 1973 plan called for a subway below Archer Avenue (from Harlem Avenue to the proposed Franklin Street Connector). The 1980 plan proposed the "Southwest Line", which would run from downtown Chicago to Ford City Mall along, in part, Cicero Avenue.

The line opened on October 31, 1993, to Midway station as the Orange Line. The extension to Ford City was relegated to future plans.

=== Unrealized or unconstrained proposals ===
==== Airport Express ====
The Airport Express was proposed to connect O'Hare and Midway airports through a planned downtown "superstation" under Block 37. Beyond the superstation, the express service would run along the existing Blue Line, Red Line, and Orange Line. In 2006, construction on the superstation began alongside construction on Block 37. To accommodate the superstation's construction, Washington station on the Red Line was closed on October 23, 2006. The closure was intended to last for two years. However, construction was indefinitely shelved in June 2008 due to cost overruns.

==== Blue Line Extensions ====
The northwestern extension to Schaumburg, Illinois, appeared in the Year 2010 Transportation System Development Plan and the 2020 Regional Transportation Plan. The extension garnered attention beginning in 1997 due to endorsements from northwest suburban officials, such as Schaumburg Mayor Al Larson, and increasing economic activities near the Northwest Tollway (now Jane Addams Memorial Tollway). In 2002, the CTA announced two alignment options for the extension: one mainly along the tollway and another along the then-proposed Elgin-O'Hare Expressway extension and Interstate 290. Either alignment would stop near Woodfield Mall and end at Schaumburg Convention Center. In May 2003, however, enthusiasm for the extension faded away in favor of Metra's Suburban Transit Access Route.

Between 1926 and 1951, rapid transit service west of Forest Park station was operational as the Westchester branch, which partially utilized the Chicago Aurora and Elgin Railroad right-of-way. A few decades after the Westchester branch became defunct, the western extension of the Congress branch first appeared in the 1995 Transportation System Plan. In 2008, the extension also appeared in the Regional Transportation Authority (RTA)'s transit plan throughout central Cook County and DuPage County. According to the RTA plan, the extension was planned to end at Yorktown Center in Lombard, Illinois.

==== Central Area Circulator ====
The direct predecessor to the Central Area Circulator, the Riverbank Line, first appeared in the Year 2000 Transportation System Development Plan. As a proposed light rail line, the line would run nearly adjacent to the Chicago River between Navy Pier and the then-proposed Southwest Line, providing intermediate connections with the Chicago and North Western Terminal and Chicago Union Station.

Beginning in 1989, the Central Area Circulator light rail system was proposed. The circulator made an appearance in the Year 2010 Transportation System Development Plan. The system would serve as far south as McCormick Place, as far west as Clinton Street, as far north as Streeterville, and as far east as Navy Pier. While the project gained support, it also gained opposition from certain businesses, citing disruption from the project. As a result, certain segments were realigned, leading to delays. The project was eventually canceled in 1995 due to state and federal funding being pulled.

==== Circle Line ====
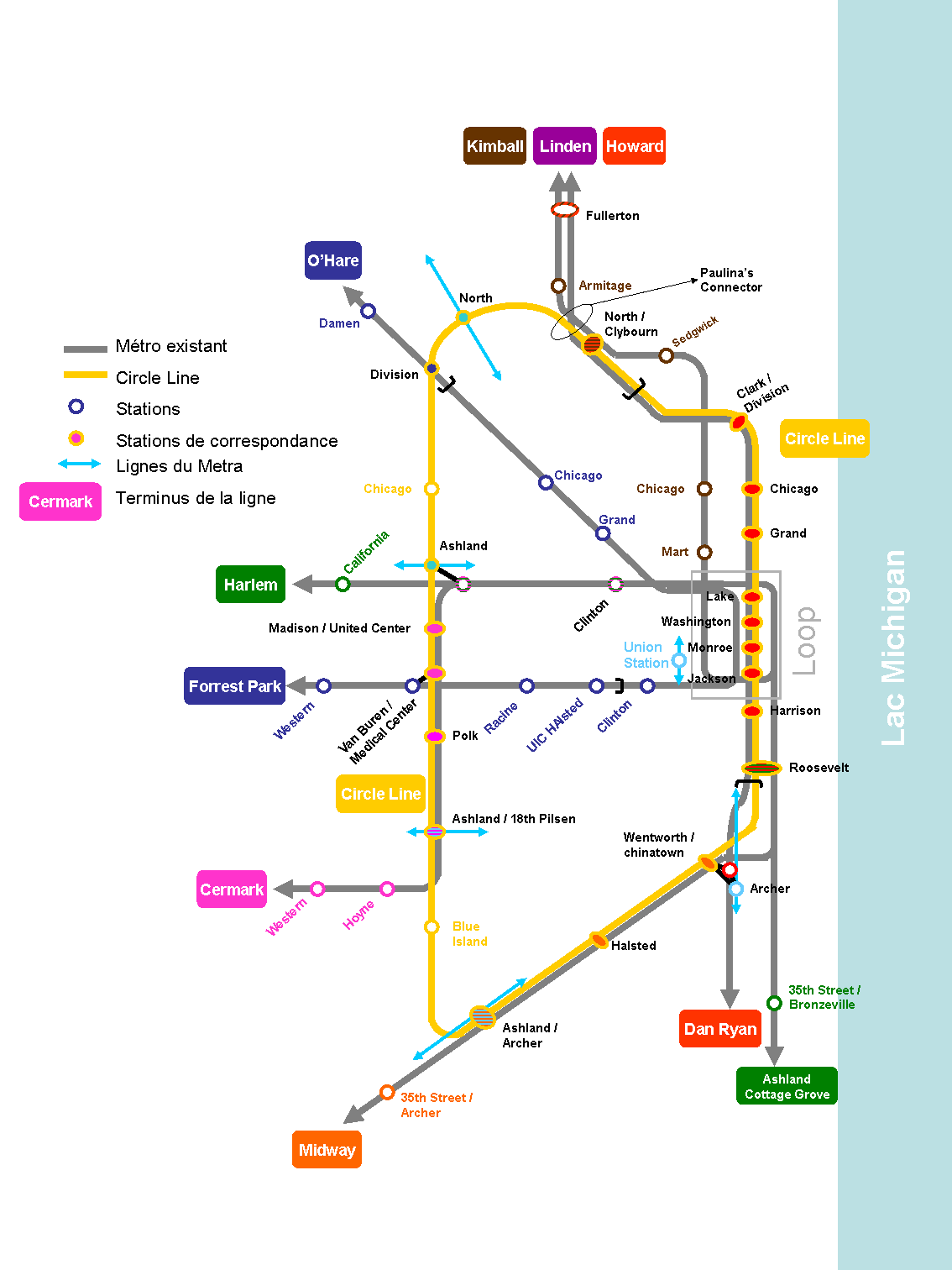
Unofficial transit map of the proposed Circle Line

Beginning in 2002, the Circle Line was planned as a circumferential route, comprising a new 6.6-mile-long (10.6 km) line spanning from the Orange Line at Ashland station to the Red Line at North/Clybourn station. The line would also travel along approximately 6 miles (9.7 km) of existing lines: the Red Line and the Orange Line. As such, the proposed line would have 22 stations. Three phases were planned in the following order:

1. Activating passenger service on the existing Paulina Connector
2. Building a rail link between the Cermak branch and the Orange Line
3. Building a rail link between the Paulina Connector and the Red Line.

With the exception of the two planned stations on the Paulina Connector, the first phase was completed in 2006 with the creation of the Pink Line. However, the rest of the plan never materialized.

==== Clinton Street subway ====
The Clinton Street subway was planned as part of the West Loop Transportation Center (WLTC), a multi-level tunnel line that would be made up of (from upper to lower levels) a concourse, a busway, the aforementioned subway, and an underground commuter (Metra) or intercity (Amtrak) rail line. Two alignment options below Clinton Street were conceived. One option was to link two points on the Blue Line: one near Milwaukee Avenue and one at Congress Parkway. This option would form an underground loop similar to its elevated counterpart. The other option would be to link two points on the Red Line.

There is currently no plan to advance the WLTC project.

==== Mid-City Transitway ====
The Mid-City Transitway was planned to run between the Blue Line near Jefferson Park and the Red Line at 87th Street via the right of ways of the Union Pacific Railroad and the Belt Railway of Chicago. The transitway's alignment roughly followed the canceled Crosstown Expressway corridor. About 20 stations were planned along the transitway. It was not clear whether the transitway would be a rail rapid transit line, a bus rapid transit line, or a truck-only road.

== See also ==
- Chicago Traction Wars
- Proposed expansion of the New York City Subway
