= Washington station (CTA Blue Line) =

Chicago "L" station

Washington 100N 36W
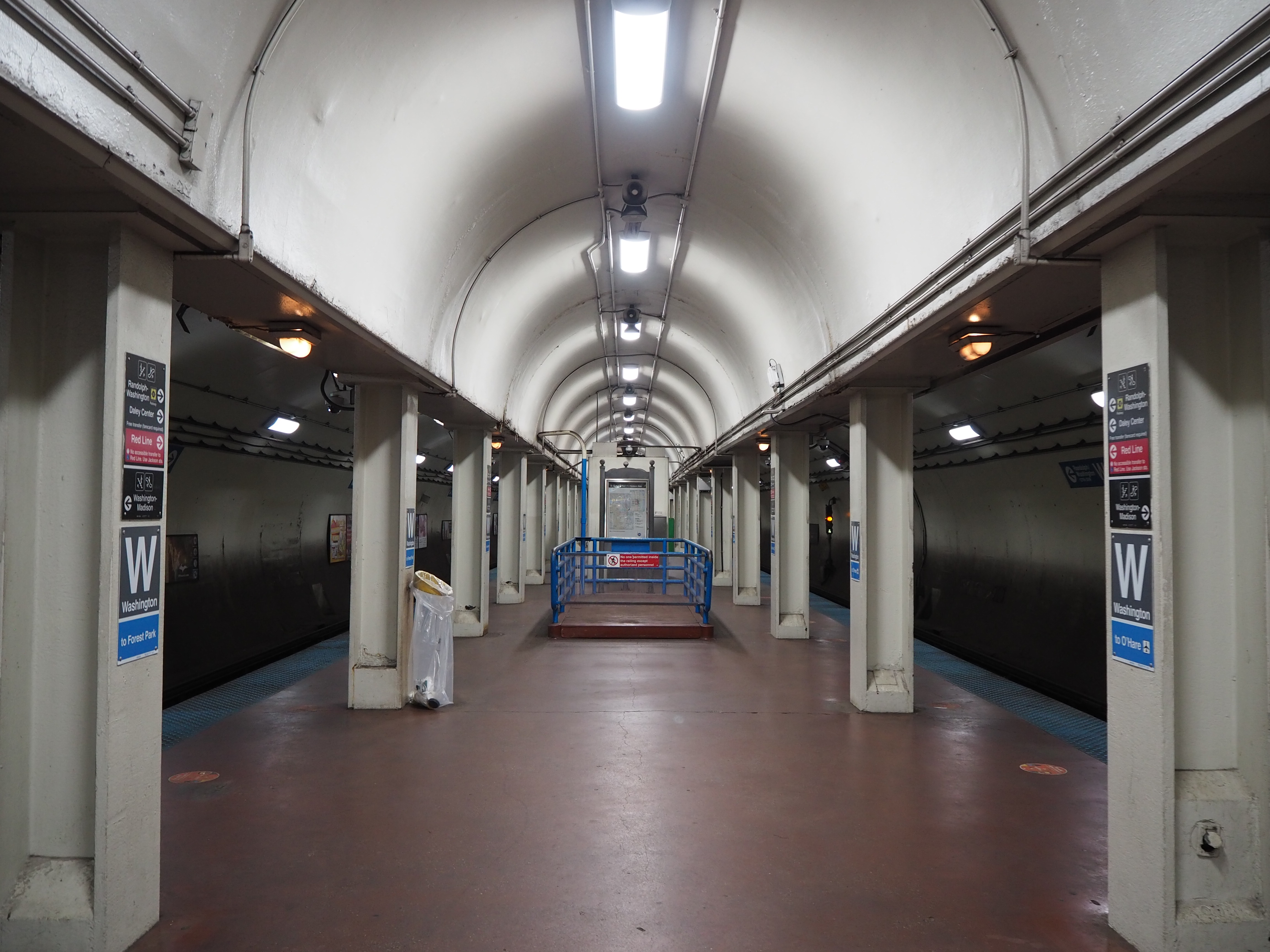

General information
- Location: 19 North Dearborn Street; Chicago, Illinois 60602
- Coordinates: 41.883164°N 87.62944°W
- Owner: City of Chicago
- Line: Milwaukee–Dearborn subway
- Platforms: 1 island platform
- Tracks: 2
- Connections: Red at Lake via The Pedway

Construction
- Structure type: Subway
- Depth: 45 feet (14 m)
- Accessible: No

History
- Opened: February 25, 1951; 75 years ago
- Rebuilt: 1982; 44 years ago (Randolph–Washington); 1983–1984; 42 years ago (Washington–Madison)

Passengers
- 2025: 2,531,556 ▲7.3%

Services
Preceding station	Chicago "L"	Following station
Clark/Lake toward O'Hare	Blue Line	Monroe toward Forest Park
Track layout
Location

Washington is an 'L' station on the CTA's Blue Line. It is situated between the Clark/Lake and Monroe stations in the Milwaukee-Dearborn subway and is near the Richard J. Daley Center.

== History ==
Washington opened on February 25, 1951, as part of the Milwaukee-Dearborn subway, the second of two subways to be constructed in Chicago. The station was entirely renovated from 1982 to 1984. As constructed, the station has two enclosed stairways to a lower level pedestrian transfer tunnel to the closed Washington station in the State Street subway. At midnight on October 23, 2006, the lower level transfer tunnel to the Red Line closed as part of the construction of a planned superstation under the Block 37 mall. On November 20, 2009, the pedway linking the Lake station's unpaid area to that of Washington reopened and beginning in May 2013, the CTA provided a farecard transfer through the pedway between the stations.

This is the northernmost of the three stations on one long continuous platform underneath Dearborn Street, with the stops at Monroe and Jackson being the other two.

== Service ==
Washington is part of the CTA's Blue Line, which runs from O'Hare to downtown Chicago and Forest Park. It is the second station in the Loop from O'Hare and the fourth from Forest Park. The station is situated between the Clark/Lake and Monroe stations. Blue Line trains serve Washington 24 hours a day every day; trains operate every 7 to 10 minutes during rush hour and midday operation, with longer headways of up to 15/20 minutes at night. 2,335,025 passengers boarded at Washington in 2010. There are two mezzanines for the station, Randolph-Washington, open 24 hours a day, providing a farecard transfer to the Red Line, and access to Daley Plaza. The second mezzanine is Washington-Madison, which is also open 24 hours a day.

== Bus connections ==
CTA

- J14 Jeffery Jump
- 20 Madison (Owl Service)
- 22 Clark (Owl Service)
- 24 Wentworth (weekdays only)
- 36 Broadway
- 56 Milwaukee
- 60 Blue Island/26th (Owl Service)
- 62 Archer (Owl Service)
- 124 Navy Pier
- 130 Museum Campus (summer service only)
- 157 Streeterville/Taylor (weekdays only)
