= Harrison station (CTA) =

Chicago "L" station

Harrison 600S 0E/0W
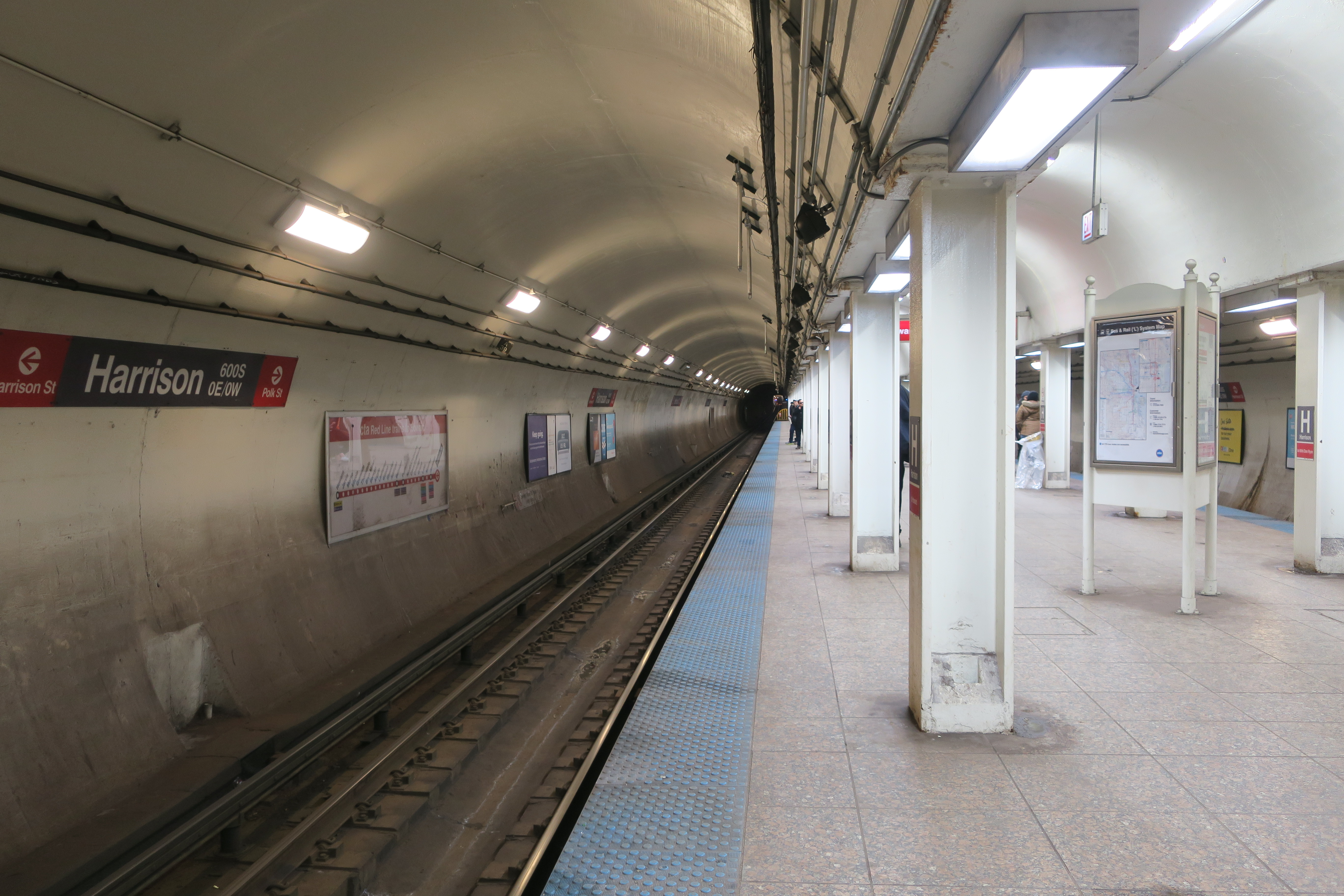

General information
- Location: 608 South State Street; Chicago, Illinois 60605
- Coordinates: 41.874039°N 87.627479°W
- Owner: City of Chicago
- Line: State Street subway
- Platforms: 1 island platform
- Tracks: 2

Construction
- Structure type: Subway
- Depth: 33 feet (10 m)
- Cycle facilities: Yes
- Accessible: No

History
- Opened: October 17, 1943; 82 years ago
- Rebuilt: 2014

Passengers
- 2025: 847,379 ▲4.8%

Services
Preceding station	Chicago "L"	Following station
Jackson toward Howard	Red Line	Roosevelt toward 95th/Dan Ryan
Track layout
Location

Harrison is an "L" subway station on the CTA's Red Line in Printer's Row, Chicago in the Loop.

== History ==
The station opened on October 17, 1943, as part of the State Street subway. The layout is typical of most stations from this section, with fare control on a mezzanine level between the street and platform. In 2006, the KDR standard signage at Harrison was replaced by the newer Current Graphic Standard signage. On February 9, 2009, an auxiliary entrance at Polk Street that was closed in 1968 was reopened due to an increase of both business and residents living in the South Loop neighborhood. On April 14, 2014, the Polk Street auxiliary entrance was temporarily closed, reopening on May 25, 2014. Later the same year, the main entrance closed on June 16 and reopened on July 28. The station entrance at Harrison is located directly in front of Jones College Prep High School.

== Bus connections ==
CTA

- 2 Hyde Park Express (weekday rush hours only)
- 6 Jackson Park Express (Southbound)
- 10 Obama Presidential Center/Museum Of Science & Industry Express
- 29 State
- 62 Archer (Owl Service)
- 130 Museum Campus (Memorial Day – Labor Day only)
- 146 Inner Lake Shore/Michigan Express
- 148 Clarendon/Michigan Express
