= Lake station (CTA) =

Chicago "L" station

Lake 200N 0E/0W

General information
- Location: 188 North State Street; Chicago, Illinois 60601
- Coordinates: 41.884809°N 87.627813°W
- Owner: City of Chicago
- Line: State Street subway
- Platforms: 1 Island platform
- Tracks: 2
- Connections: Blue at Washington via The Pedway; Brown Green Orange Pink Purple at Washington/Wabash (temporarily, during the closure of State/Lake until mid-2029)

Construction
- Structure type: Subway
- Depth: 35 feet (11 m)
- Cycle facilities: Yes (Randolph Entrance)
- Accessible: Yes

History
- Opened: October 17, 1943 (as part of Washington); June 2, 1996 (as temporary Washington-Lake station); November 18, 1997 (as permanent Lake station)
- Rebuilt: 1996–97 (Randolph-Washington mezzanine); 2004–05 (Lake-Randolph mezzanine and platform); 2026–29 (Elevator added at Lake-Randolph mezzanine)
- Former names: Washington (part of that station); Lake-Washington (as temporarily separate station stop)

Passengers
- 2025: 3,595,197 ▲5.7%
- Rank: 1 out of 143

Services
Preceding station	Chicago "L"	Following station
Grand toward Howard	Red Line	Monroe toward 95th/Dan Ryan
Former services
Preceding station	Chicago "L"	Following station
Grand toward Howard	Red Line	Washington Closed 2006 toward 95th/Dan Ryan
Track layout
Location

Lake is an "L" station on the CTA's Red Line in the Chicago Loop that is part of the State Street subway. Lake is a transfer station between the Red Line and the Brown, Green, Orange, Pink, and Purple Lines at the State/Lake station and the Blue Line at Washington via the Chicago Pedway. In 2019, Lake had an average of 19,364 weekday passenger entries, making it the busiest 'L' station.

Lake is linked to Millennium Station and Millennium Park via a Chicago Pedway connection that can be accessed at its Randolph–Washington exit.

On November 20, 2009, the Chicago Pedway, along with the Block 37 shopping mall, reopened, linking the free sections of Lake and Washington stations.

This station was originally part of the now-closed Washington station. The original station was physically separated on June 2, 1996, for the renovation of the Randolph-Washington mezzanine. Later, Lake became an independent station on November 18, 1997, to better facilitate transfers between the Red Line subway and the elevated State/Lake station.

In 2026, State/Lake closed for an extensive renovation, scheduled to be completed in mid-2029. During the closure, the CTA redirects passengers to transfer at Washington/Wabash.

== Bus connections ==
CTA

- 2 Hyde Park Express (weekday rush hours only)
- 6 Jackson Park Express
- 10 Obama Presidential Center/Museum of Science and Industry Express
- 29 State
- 36 Broadway
- 62 Archer (Owl Service)
- 146 Inner Lake Shore/Michigan Express
