= Monroe station (CTA Red Line) =

Chicago "L" station

Monroe 100S 0E/0W
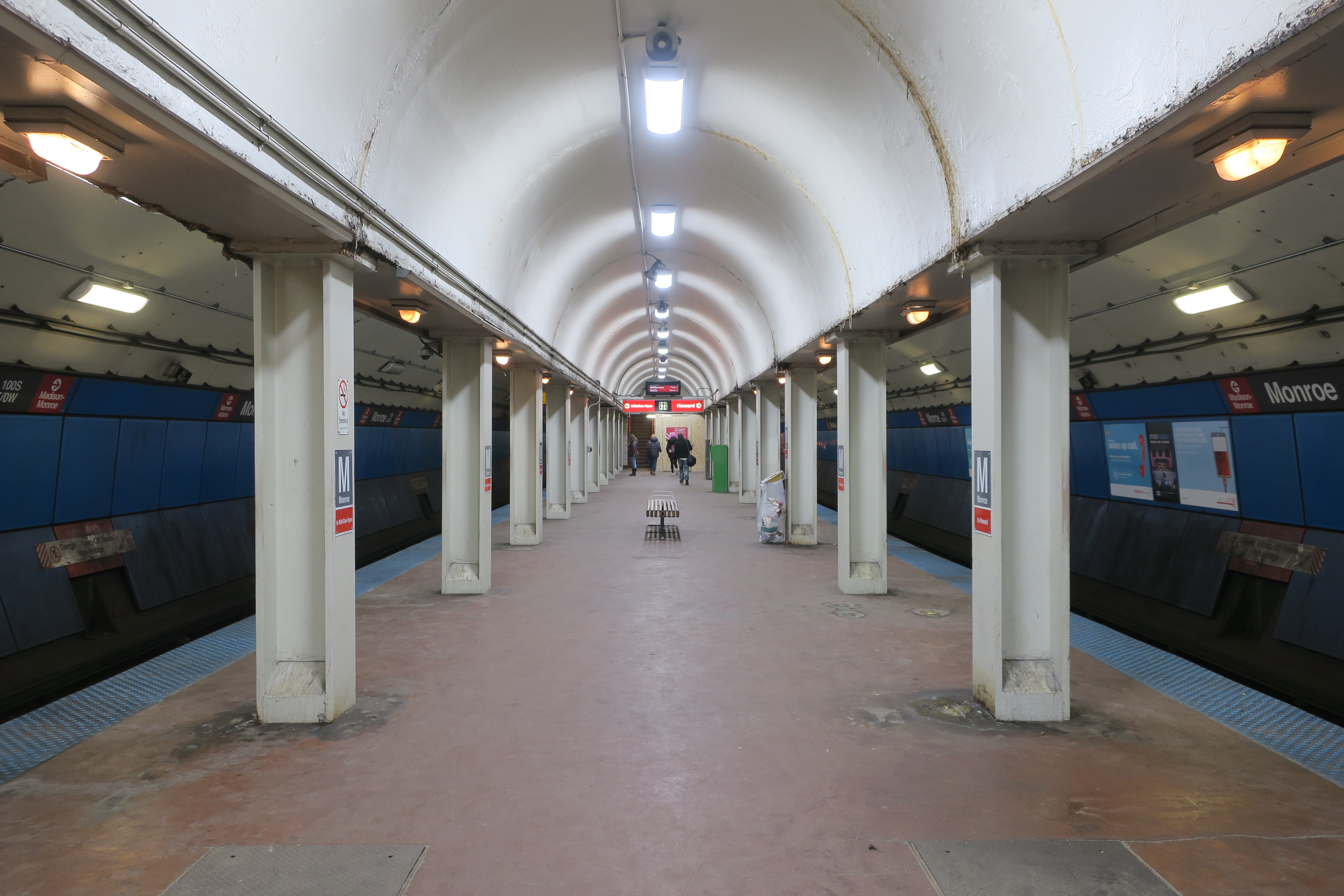

General information
- Location: 26 South State Street; Chicago, Illinois 60603
- Coordinates: 41.880745°N 87.627696°W
- Owner: City of Chicago
- Line: State Street subway
- Platforms: 1 island platform
- Tracks: 2

Construction
- Structure type: Subway
- Depth: 33 feet (10 m)
- Cycle facilities: Yes
- Accessible: No

History
- Opened: October 17, 1943; 82 years ago

Passengers
- 2025: 1,320,475 ▲5.8%

Services
Preceding station	Chicago "L"	Following station
Lake toward Howard	Red Line	Jackson toward 95th/Dan Ryan
Former services
Preceding station	Chicago "L"	Following station
Washington Closed 2006 toward Howard	Red Line	Jackson toward 95th/Dan Ryan
Track layout
Location

Monroe is an "L" station on the CTA's Red Line. The station opened on October 17, 1943, as part of the State Street subway. The station is located in the Chicago Loop, and is open 24/7.

== History ==
Monroe station has retained many of its original features from its opening in 1943, such as the officers' cabins, some auxiliary signaling and the Madison-Monroe mezzanine, which is named for the crossing of Madison Street and Monroe Street.

The station gives direct access to the adjacent Carson, Pirie, Scott and Company Building, a National Historic Landmark and Chicago Landmark, that is also part of the Loop Retail Historic District.

== Bus connections ==
CTA

- 2 Hyde Park Express (weekday rush hours only)
- 6 Jackson Park Express
- 10 Obama Presidential Center/Museum of Science and Industry Express
- 29 State
- 36 Broadway
- 62 Archer (Owl Service)
- 146 Inner Lake Shore/Michigan Express
- 147 Outer DuSable Lake Shore Express
- 151 Sheridan
