= Washington station (CTA Red Line) =

Closed subway station in Chicago

Washington 128N 1E/1W
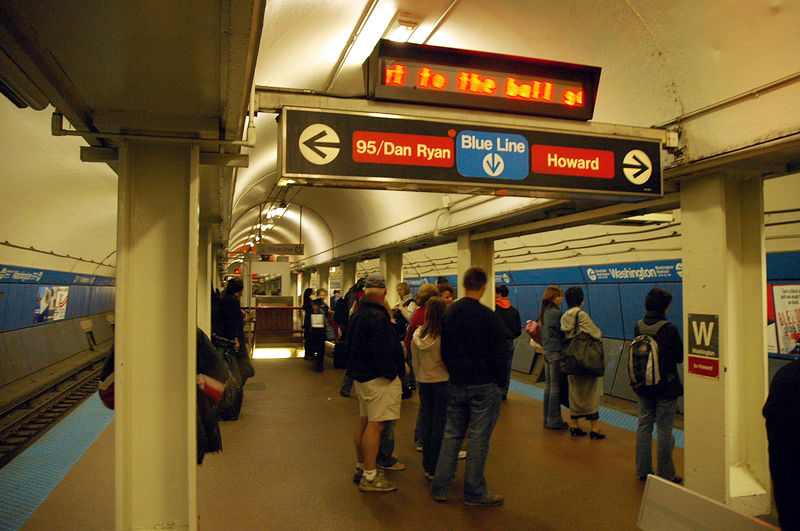
- Washington station in May 2005

General information
- Location: 128 North State Street; Chicago, Illinois 60602
- Coordinates: 41.8837°N 87.6278°W
- Owner: City of Chicago
- Line: State Street subway
- Platforms: 1 Island platform
- Tracks: 2
- Connections: (Formerly via Washington) Blue Line

Construction
- Structure type: Subway
- Accessible: Yes

History
- Opened: October 17, 1943
- Closed: October 23, 2006

Former services
Preceding station	Chicago "L"	Following station
Lake toward Howard	Red Line	Monroe toward 95th/Dan Ryan
Track layout
Location

Washington is a closed "L" station on the CTA's Red Line. It was a subway station in the State Street subway located at 128 North State Street in the Loop.

== History ==
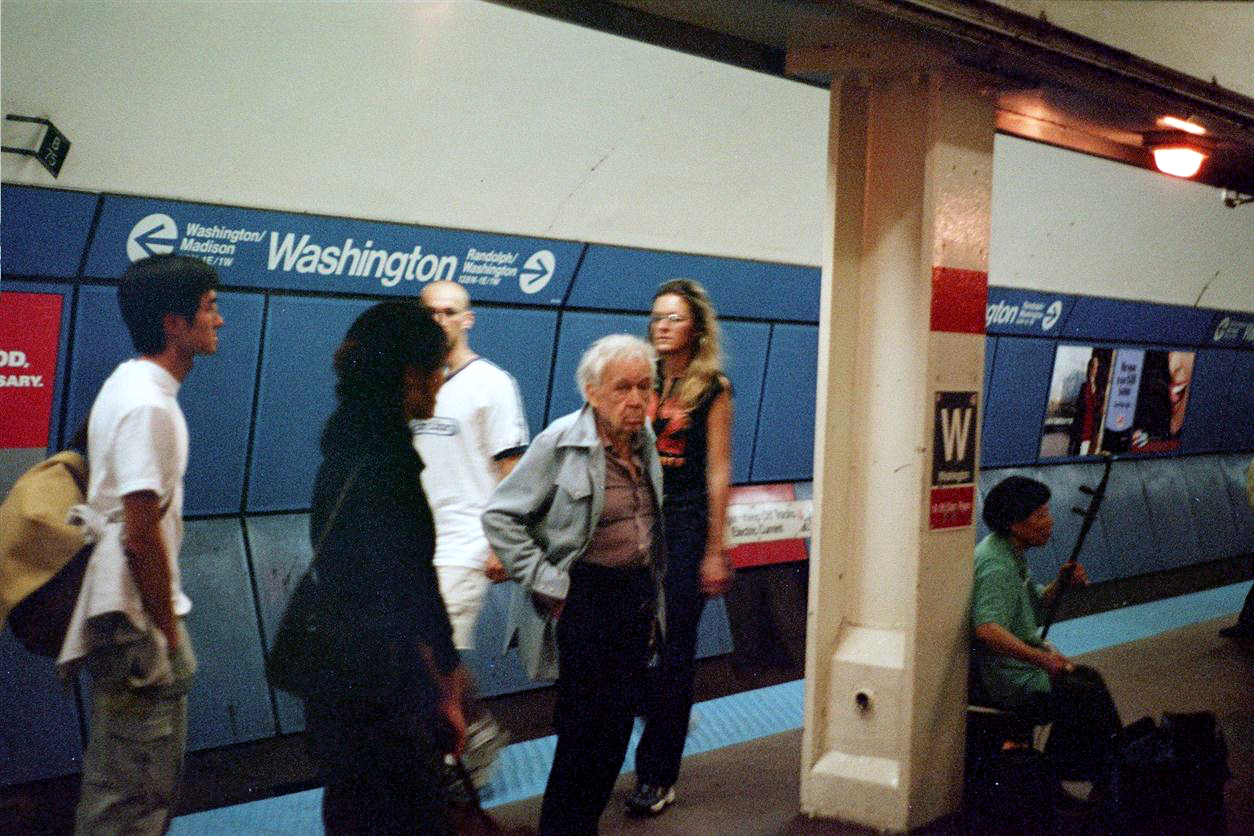
Washington station in July 2001

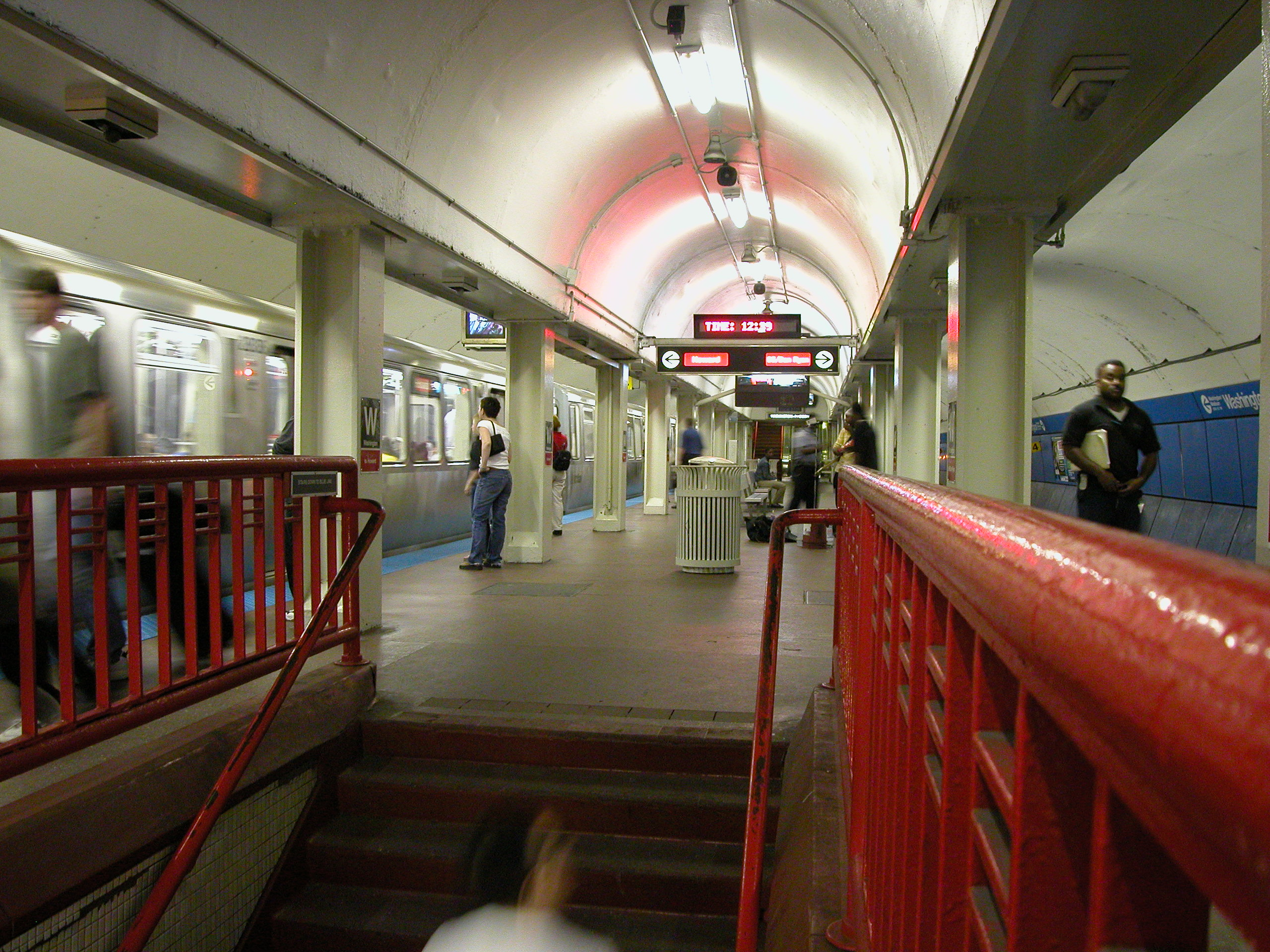
Stairs to the Washington Blue Line station that have since been sealed off.

The platform at Washington is part of a long continuous platform beneath State Street which runs from the Jackson station to the Lake station, making it the United States' longest continuous passenger platform. There are two mezzanines for the station, a northern at Randolph shared with the Lake station and a southern at Madison. There are stairs and escalators along State Street between Randolph and Madison to access both mezzanines. Additionally, Washington is equipped with an elevator to the Randolph mezzanine and was therefore accessible to people with disabilities. There is another elevator between that mezzanine and State Street, which is still in use for access to the Lake station.

There were two stairways on the platform to a lower level pedestrian tunnel that connected the Washington station to the Washington station in the Milwaukee–Dearborn subway, to allow transfers between the Red and Blue Lines. Lake station to the north of Washington and Washington station were originally a single station, but they were separated on June 2, 1996, due to the renovation project of the Randolph-Washington mezzanine and Lake became an independent station on November 18, 1997, in order to better facilitate transfers between the Red Line subway and the elevated State/Lake station.

=== Closure for Block 37 superstation ===
As part of the development of 108 North State Street (known as Block 37), The City of Chicago planned to construct a superstation located under the Block 37 mall. Washington/State station, and the lower level transfer tunnel to the Blue Line closed at midnight on October 23, 2006, for work related to the construction of this new station.

Following cost overruns of $100 million, the superstation was indefinitely mothballed in June 2008. The Block 37 superstation which had already been partially built, was left abandoned. The Washington/State station was still closed, and the station's platform reopened in February 2010. The station remained closed and trains never resumed stopping at the station.

=== Post closure ===
When the CTA closed the Washington/State station, the station was left intact. No work was performed to improve the Washington-Madison mezzanine in the case that a reopening was considered. The platform changed little except for the removal of its signage. Washington/State was removed from CTA rail maps in January 2009.

Due to its location, the Washington station is still easily accessible for pedestrian access via the Lake and Monroe stations.

As of January 2026, the CTA does not consider the station to have closed permanently, but there are currently no plans to reopen the station.
