= Milwaukee–Dearborn subway =

Segment of the Chicago "L"

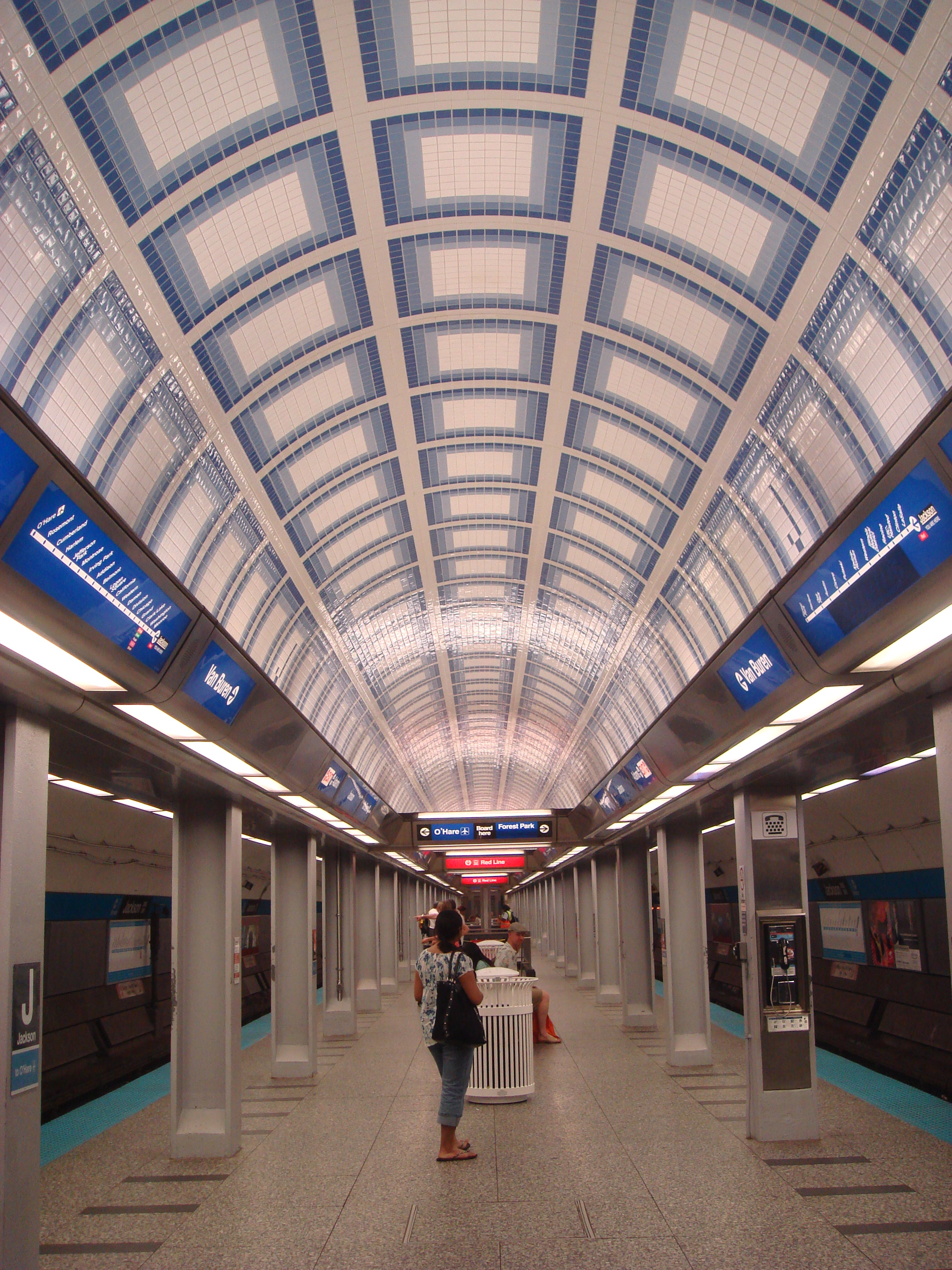
- Platform at Jackson/Dearborn

Overview
- Status: Operational
- Locale: Chicago, Illinois, United States
- Termini: Division; Clinton
- Stations: 9

Service
- Type: Rapid transit
- System: Chicago "L"
- Services: Blue
- Operator(s): Chicago Transit Authority
- Rolling stock: 2600-series, 3200-series, 7000-series
- Daily ridership: 47,917 (average weekday 2019)

History
- Opened: February 25, 1951; 75 years ago

Technical
- Line length: 3.85 mi (6.20 km)
- Character: Subway
- Track gauge: 4 ft 8 1/2 in (1,435 mm) standard gauge
- Electrification: Third rail, 600 V DC

The Milwaukee–Dearborn subway is an underground section of the Chicago "L" system in The Loop, Chicago, Illinois. It is 3.85 mi (6.20 km) long and forms the central part of the Blue Line. As of September 2025, the subway serves an average of 19,337 passengers each weekday. Since the subway is served by the Blue Line, it is open to passengers 24 hours a day and 365 days a year.

== History ==
The Milwaukee–Dearborn subway project was funded by New Deal programs established by Franklin D. Roosevelt during the Great Depression. In 1937, the city of Chicago successfully applied for a federal grant and loan from the Works Progress Administration to fund the construction of two subway tunnels, the first of which would be built beneath State Street and the second beneath Milwaukee Avenue and Dearborn Street. In March 1939, construction began on the Milwaukee–Dearborn subway. The tunnel was buried deep to enable the use of a tunnel boring machine throughout the construction of the subway. Only brief sections were built using the "cut-and-cover" method. Rationing imposed by World War II delayed completion of the subway due to a shortage of materials. Construction on the Milwaukee–Dearborn subway, which was 80% completed in 1942, was temporarily halted to allow for the scarce supply of labor and materials to be used to continue construction of the State Street subway, which was considered a priority. In December 1945, the city of Chicago resumed work on the Milwaukee–Dearborn subway.

The Milwaukee–Dearborn subway officially opened for passenger service on February 25, 1951. In 1958, the southern branch of the tunnel was extended under Congress Parkway, past its former terminus at LaSalle, to connect to the Congress Branch in the median of the Eisenhower Expressway. A new station was opened at this time at Clinton Street. On February 9, 1992, the Chicago Transit Authority closed the Grand/Milwaukee station due to budget cuts and low ridership. The station reopened on June 25, 1999 at 6:00 a.m. On April 13, 1992, the Milwaukee–Dearborn subway closed due to the great flood of Chicago.

The three neighboring stations in the Loop area, Washington, Monroe, and Jackson, form one long continuous platform that runs underneath Dearborn Street.

=== Incidents ===
On July 11, 2006, a train derailment caused a fire in the Milwaukee–Dearborn subway, causing the subway to be closed temporarily. 150 people were injured to varying degrees but there were no fatalities.

== Service ==
On February 21, 1993, the CTA color-coded the lines, making the Milwaukee–Dearborn subway part of the present day Blue Line. The Blue Line runs 24 hours a day/7 days a week, providing service between O'Hare and Forest Park.

== Station listing ==
Station	Location	Notes
Division	1200 N. Milwaukee Avenue, Chicago	
Chicago	800 N. Milwaukee Avenue, Chicago	
Grand	502 N. Milwaukee Avenue, Chicago	
Clark/Lake	124 W. Lake Street, Chicago	Originally Called Lake Transfer
Washington	127 N. Dearborn Street, Chicago	
Monroe	30 S. Dearborn Street, Chicago	
Jackson	312 S. Dearborn Street, Chicago	
LaSalle	150 W. Ida B. Wells Drive, Chicago	Originally Called Congress Terminal
Clinton	426 S. Clinton Street, Chicago	

== Image gallery ==
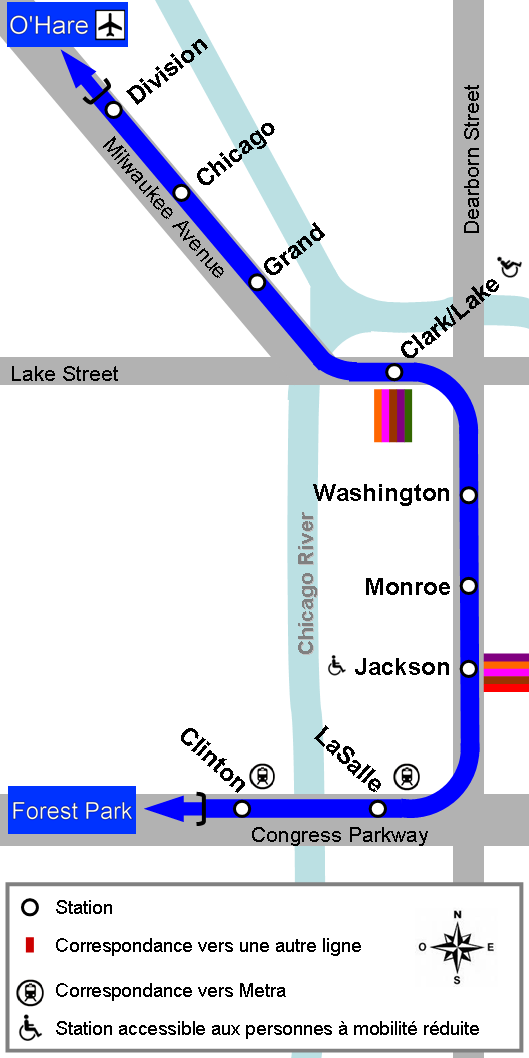
The route of the subway as it shows majority of the route in the Loop area

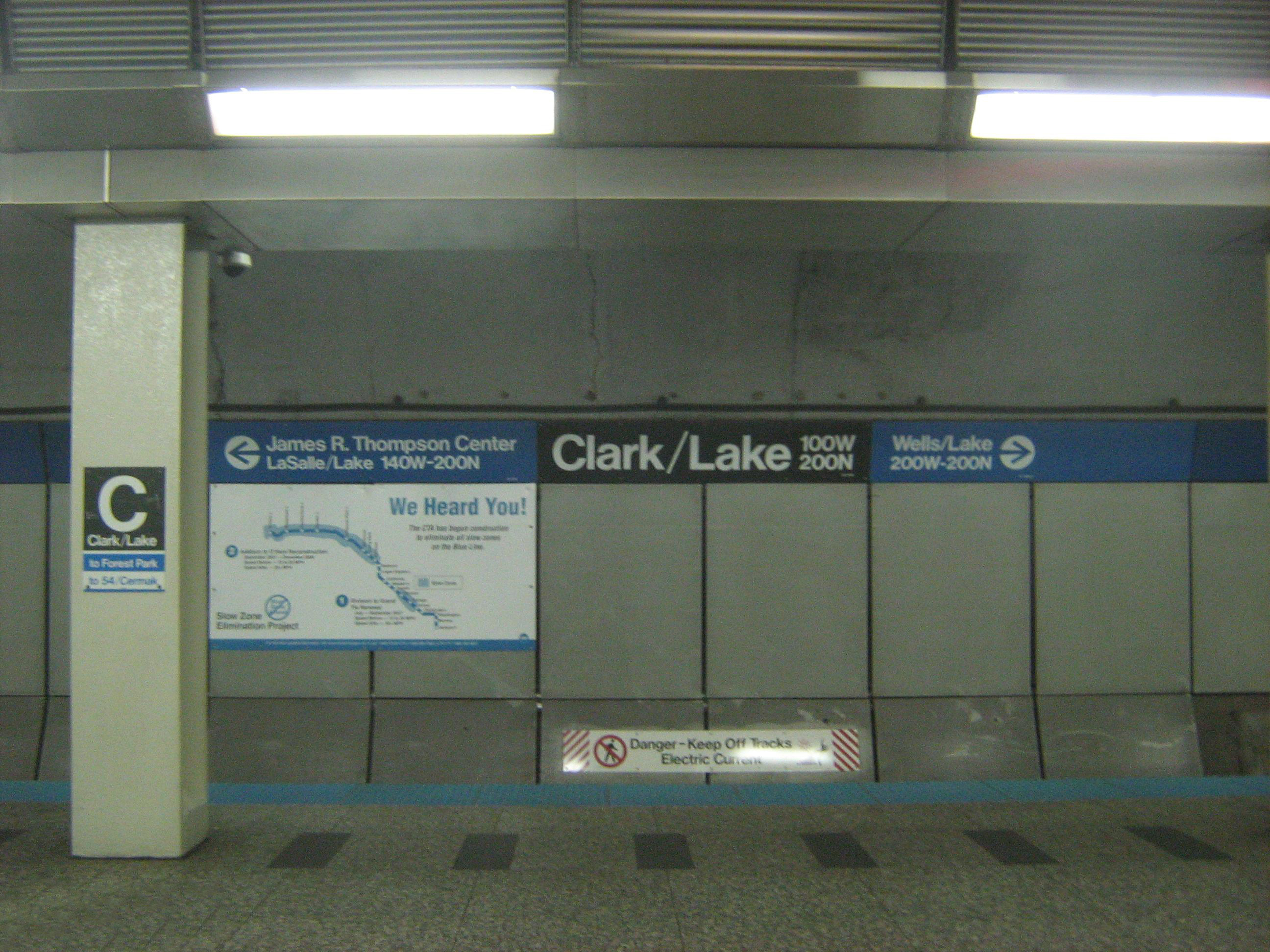
The subway platform at Clark/Lake, the network's busiest tri-level station

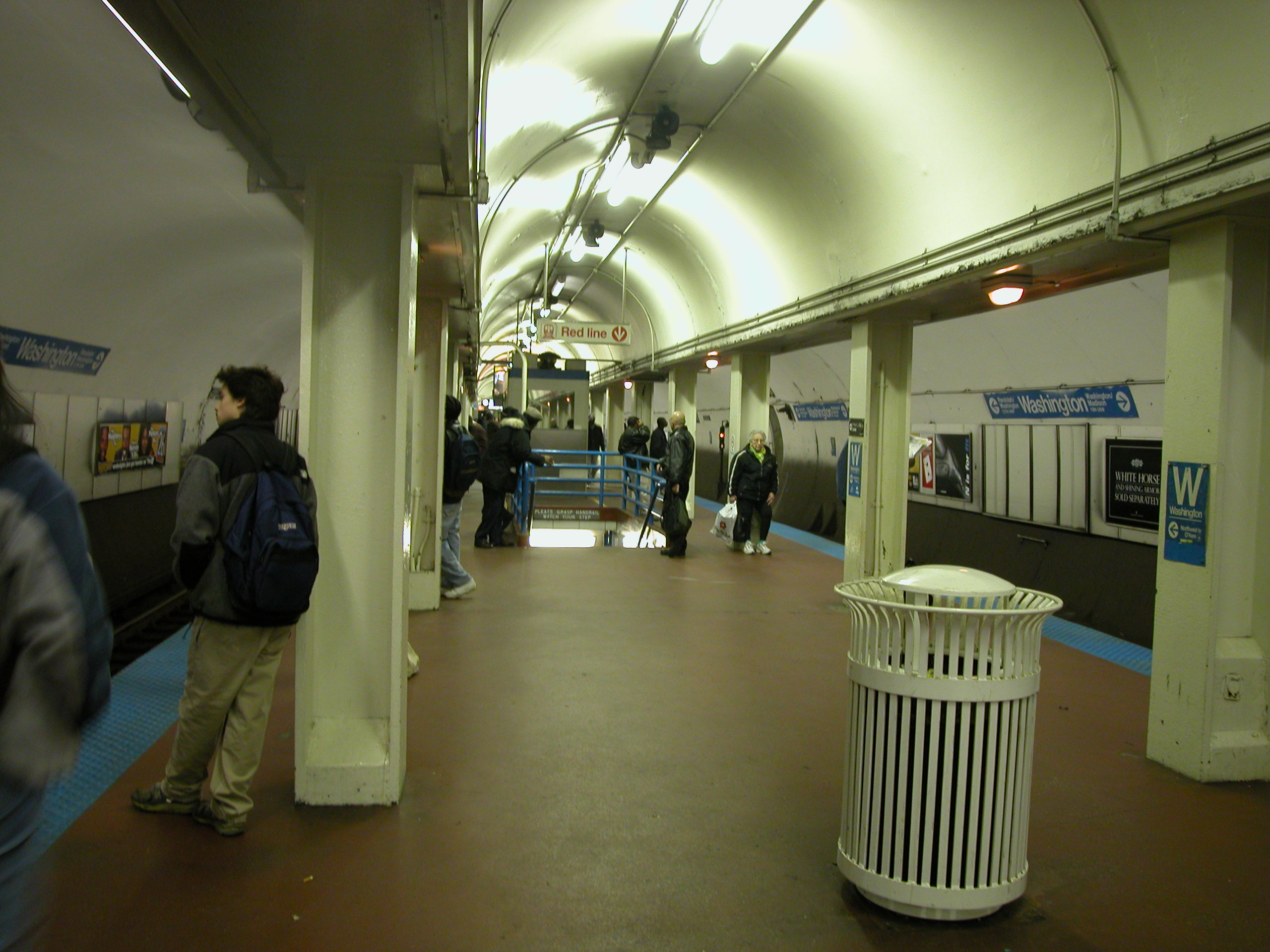
The Washington station used to have a former tunnel connection to the Red Line's closed Washington station
