= State Street subway =

Segment of the Chicago "L"

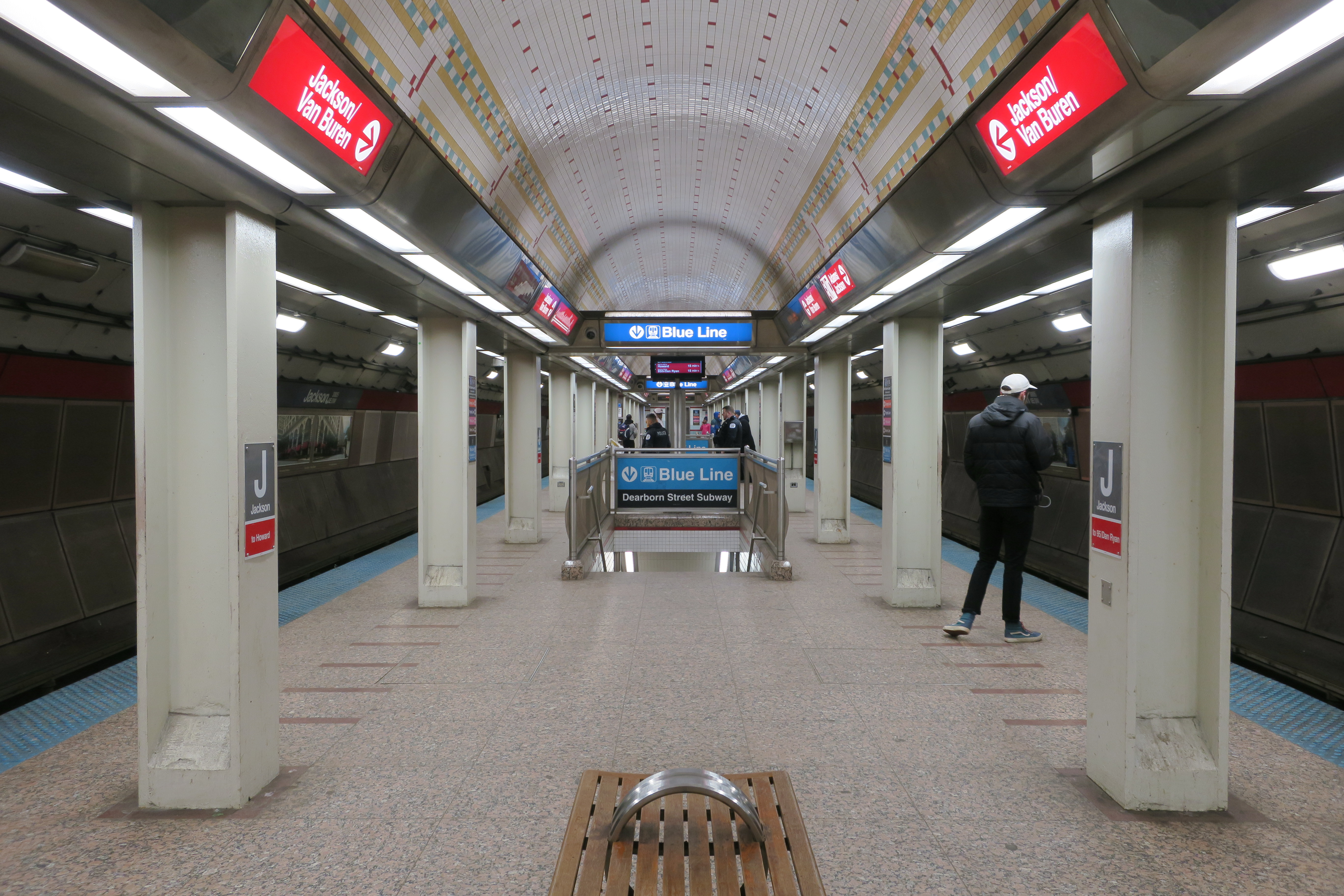
- Platform at Jackson/State

Overview
- Status: Operational
- Locale: Chicago, Illinois, United States
- Termini: North/Clybourn; Roosevelt
- Stations: 9

Service
- Type: Rapid transit
- System: Chicago "L"
- Services: Red
- Operator(s): Chicago Transit Authority (1947–present); Chicago Rapid Transit Company (1943–1947)
- Rolling stock: 5000-series
- Daily ridership: 52,664 (weekdays, August 2024) (Note: This figure is the sum of average weekday boardings at 9 Red Line stations from North/Clybourn to Roosevelt, as of August 2024. The CTA's statistics for Roosevelt station also include passengers boarding Green Line and Orange line trains.)

History
- Opened: October 17, 1943; 82 years ago

Technical
- Line length: 4.9 mi (7.9 km)
- Character: Subway
- Track gauge: 4 ft 8 1/2 in (1,435 mm) standard gauge
- Electrification: Third rail, 600 V DC

The State Street subway is an underground section of the Chicago "L" system, carrying the Red Line through the Chicago Loop. The subway is 4.9 mi (7.9 km) long, running underneath Clybourn Avenue, Division Street, and State Street. Red Line trains run through the State Street subway 24/7, with trains arriving every 4 to 15 minutes. As of August 2024, the subway's 9 stations serve 52,664 boardings per average weekday.

The subway's architecture is mostly in the Streamline Moderne style, and is similar to that of Chicago's second subway tunnel, the Milwaukee–Dearborn subway. Three of the subway's stations are located along a continuous platform, which is the longest subway platform in the world. The continuous platform connects Lake, Monroe, and Jackson stations, and is approximately 3,500 ft (1,100 m) long.

The State Street subway was constructed as part of the New Deal, and opened in 1943. It originally connected to the North Side main line at its north end and the South Side Elevated at its south end. Since 1990, it has also connected to the Dan Ryan branch at the south end. The current service pattern began in 1993, with Red Line trains running from the North Side main line through the subway to the Dan Ryan branch.

== History ==
The State Street subway project was funded by New Deal programs established by Franklin D. Roosevelt during the Great Depression. In 1937, the city of Chicago successfully applied for a federal grant and loan from the Works Progress Administration to fund the construction of two subway tunnels, the first of which would be built beneath State Street and the second beneath Milwaukee Avenue and Dearborn Street.

On December 17, 1938, the city of Chicago began construction of the State Street subway at the intersection of State Street and Chicago Avenue. The tunnel was buried deep to enable the use of a tunnel boring machine throughout the construction of the subway. Only brief sections were built using the "cut-and-cover" method. Unlike the Milwaukee–Dearborn subway, no delays occurred in construction and the subway opened for revenue service on October 17, 1943.

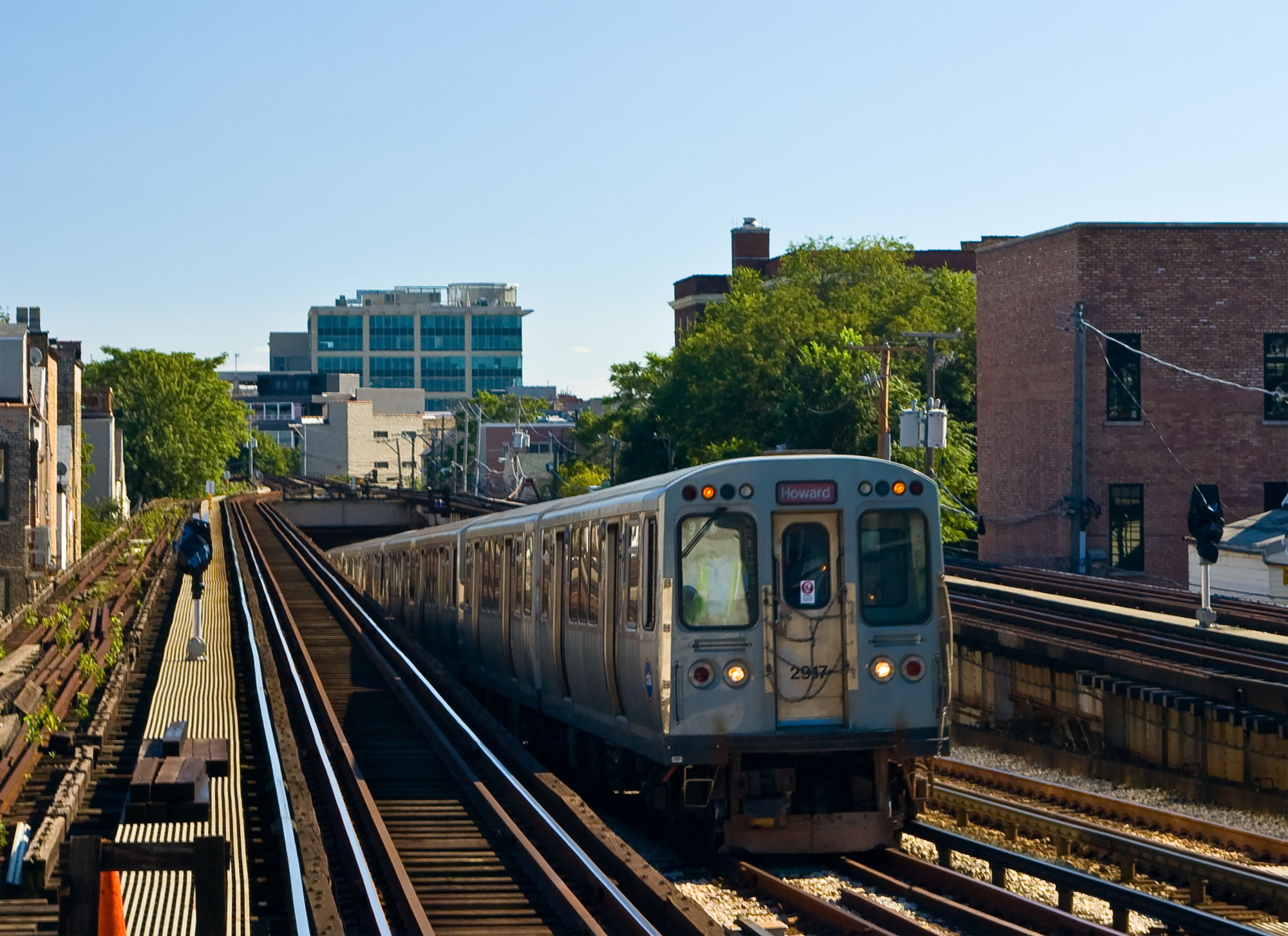
2600-series train exiting the north portal of the subway at Willow Street

In November 1985, work began to extend the State Street subway south from its original portal at 13th and State Street, where it connected to the South Side main Line, and the Englewood and Jackson Park branches, in order to connect the State Street subway to the Dan Ryan branch. The subway extension was completed by January 25, 1990, but did not immediately enter passenger service. On February 21, 1993, the CTA color-coded the lines and made the State Street subway and Dan Ryan Branch part of the present day Red Line. Trains were rerouted through the new subway extension to the Dan Ryan Branch which runs to 95th/Dan Ryan, while the South Side Elevated branch became part of the present day Green Line.

On April 13, 1992, during the Chicago flood 250,000,000 US gallons (950,000,000 L) of water poured into Chicago's subways and the basements of nearby buildings. Service through the State Street subway was stopped temporarily, while water was pumped out of the tunnels.

On November 18, 1997, the station at Lake permanently opened as an independent station, offering transfers to the elevated State/Lake station. Lake was originally part of the Washington station. On October 23, 2006, the Washington station closed due to the Block 37 project.

== Station listing ==
Station	Location	Notes
North/Clybourn	1599 N. Clybourn Avenue	
Clark/Division	1200 N. Clark Street	
Chicago	800 N. State Street	
Grand	521 N. State Street	
Lake	188 N. State Street	
Washington	128 N. State Street	Closed October 23, 2006
Monroe	26 S. State Street	
Jackson	230 S. State Street	
Harrison	608 S. State Street	
Roosevelt	1167 S. State Street	

== Image gallery ==
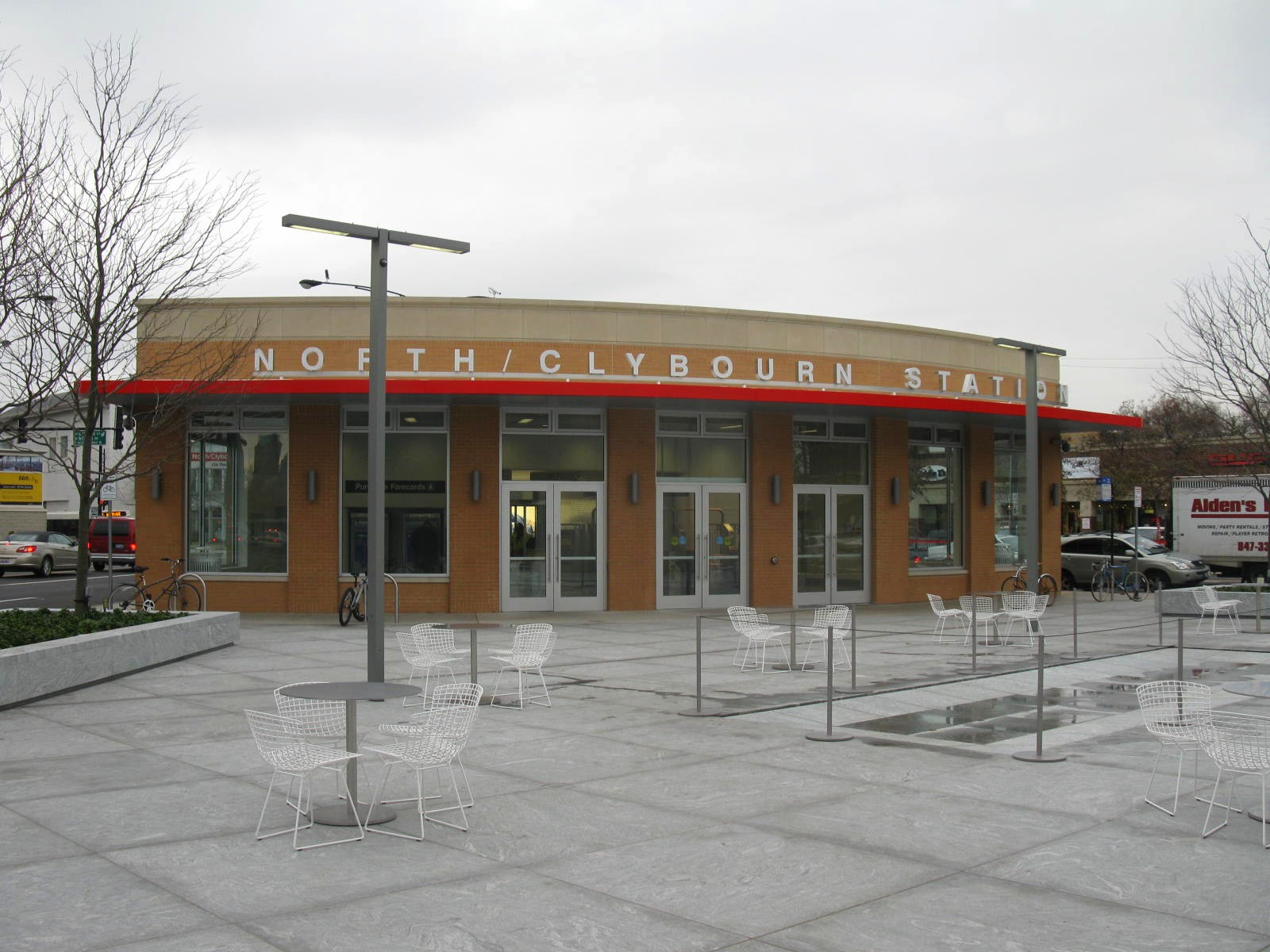
The renovated head house of North/Clybourn on November 29, 2010

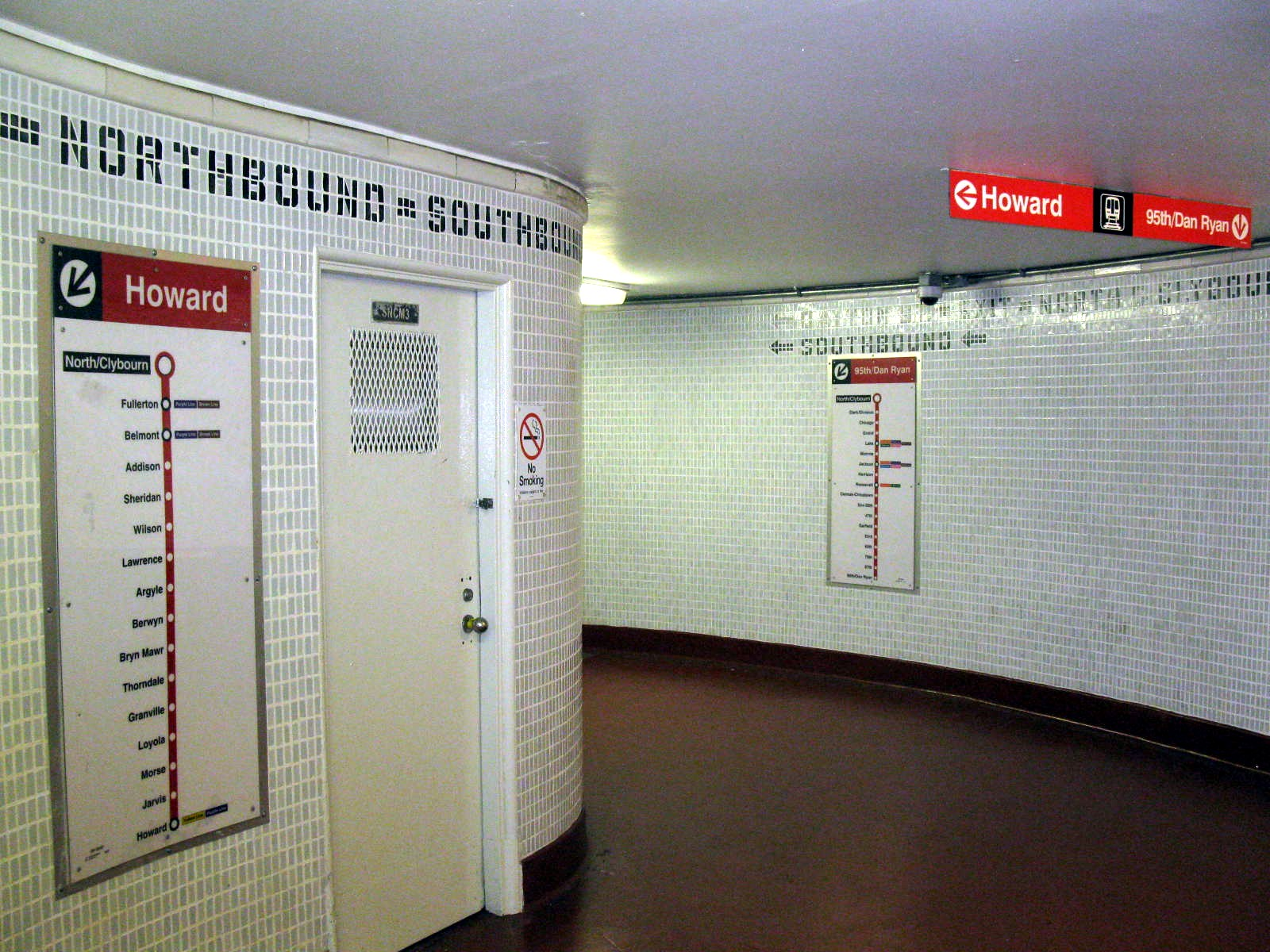
Inside the North/Clybourn station on November 29, 2010

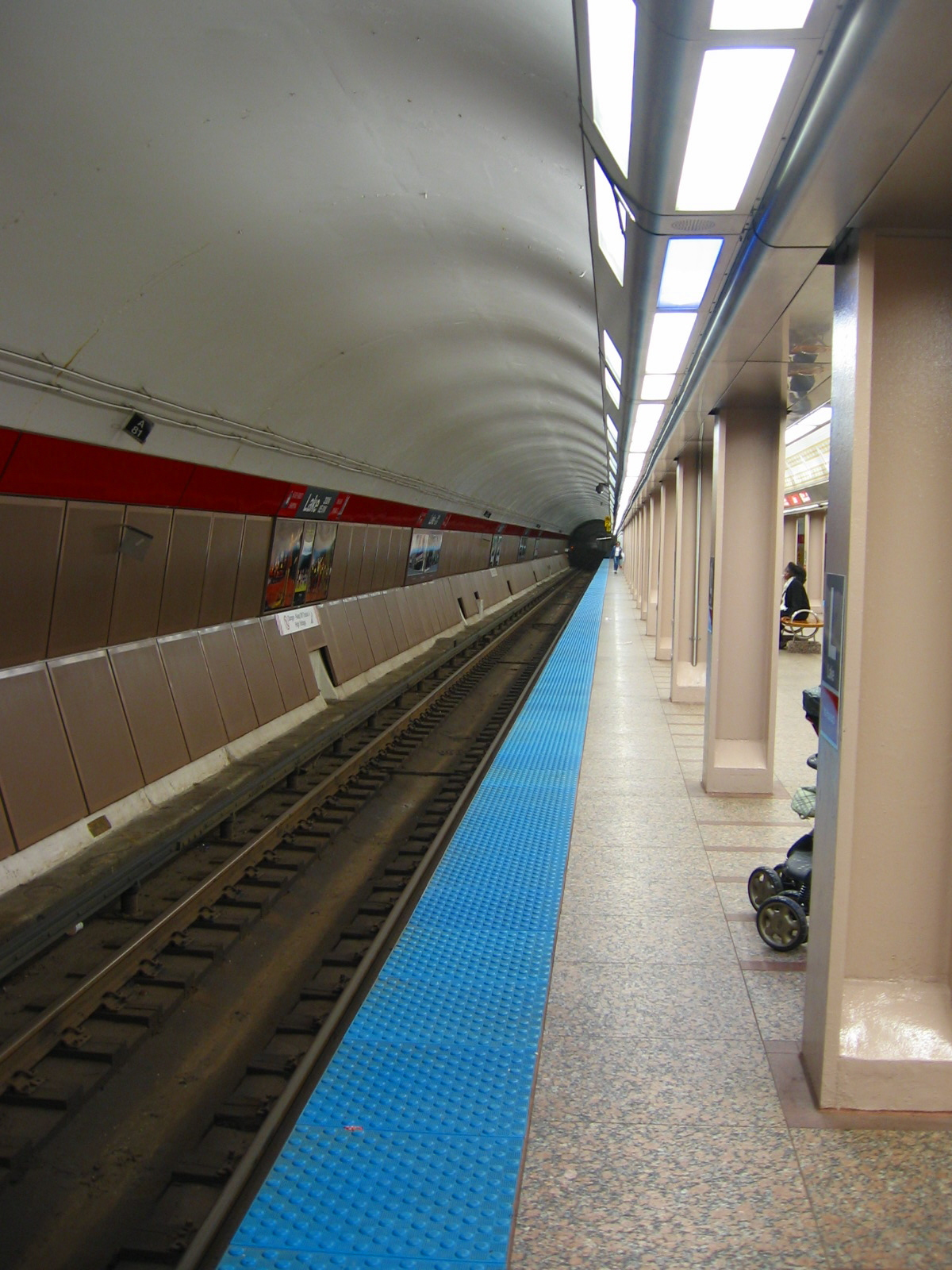
The Lake street platform, May 2006

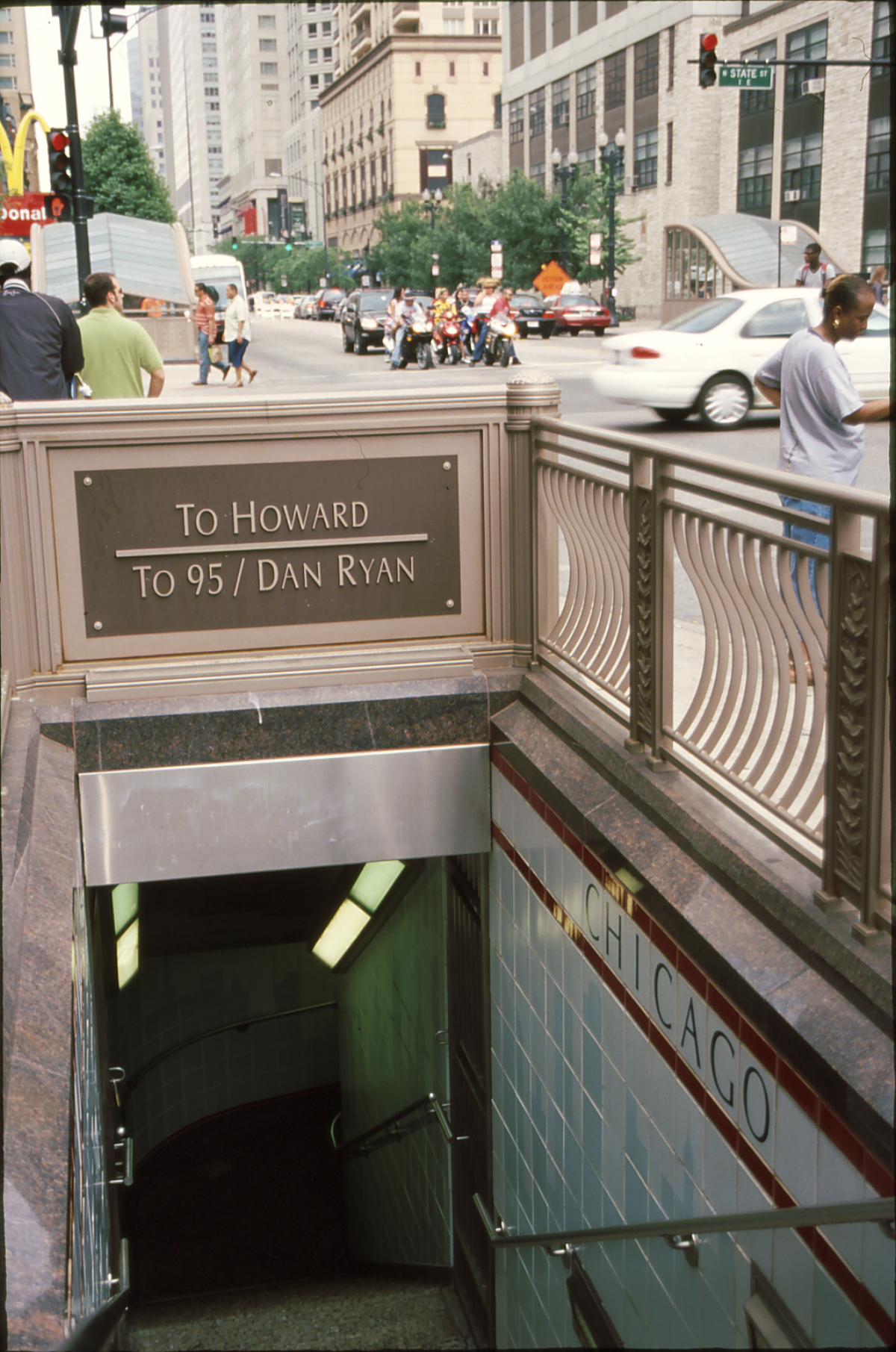
An entrance to the Chicago/State station, July 2007

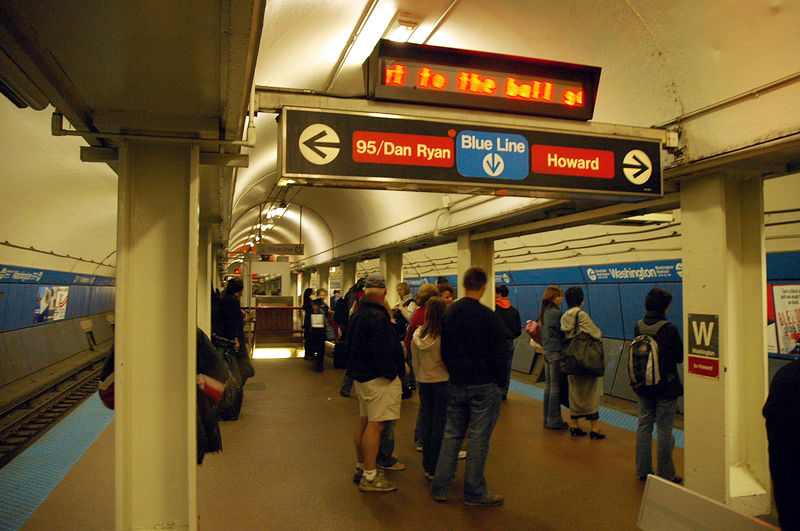
The Washington/State station, 2005
