= List of Chicago "L" stations =

Rapid transit stations in Chicago

A current map depicting the eight rapid transit lines of the Chicago "L" system. Map is not drawn to scale.

The Chicago "L" is a rapid transit system that serves the city of Chicago and seven of its surrounding suburbs. The system is operated by the Chicago Transit Authority (CTA). On an average weekday, 759,866 passengers ride the "L", making it the third-busiest rapid transit system in the United States, behind the New York City Subway and the Washington Metro.

The system began as three separate companies, which built lines traveling from Chicago's central business district to the south and the west. The first of these was the Chicago and South Side Rapid Transit Railroad which opened on June 6, 1892. The Lake Street Elevated Railroad opened the following year and the Metropolitan West Side Elevated Railroad followed in 1895. Initially, the "L" lines operated independently of each other, but in 1897, they were combined into one physically unified system with the completion of the Union Loop and connecting trackage. In 1900, the Northwestern Elevated Railroad entered operation, finalizing the basic structure of the system: a hub and spoke distribution paradigm radiating north, west, and south from downtown Chicago. The system expanded outward from this with new branches or line extensions until 1930.

Due to the ruined financial state of the privately owned Chicago Rapid Transit Company and the Chicago Surface Lines, a public agency (the CTA) was created in 1947 to take over and save the rapid transit and streetcar systems. Starting in 1948, the CTA began systematically shutting down many stations and lines that saw little use in order to improve service and reduce costs. Expansion resumed in September 1969, with the opening of a new line in the median of the Dan Ryan Expressway and continued until October 31, 1993, with the opening of the Orange Line. The newest line is the Pink Line, which opened on June 25, 2006, was created by rerouting the Blue Line's Douglas branch into a separate service.

As of August 2024, the system has 146 stations on eight lines operating on 224.1 miles (360.7 km) of track. A total of 108 stations are compliant with the Americans with Disabilities Act of 1990 and are accessible to passengers with disabilities. The majority of "L" stations are named for the streets or intersections on which they are located; others are named for neighborhoods, suburbs, destinations, or a combination of these. The newest station is Damen on the Green Line, which opened on August 5, 2024.

== Lines ==
Chicago "L" lines
Line	Stations	Termini	Weekday ridership (as of May 2026)
Blue	33	O'Hare (north); Rosemont (north, weekday rush hour service); Jefferson Park (north, weekday rush hour service); Forest Park (south); UIC–Halsted (south, weekday rush hour service)	90,525
Brown	27	Kimball (north); The Loop (south)	40,640
Green	31	Harlem/Lake (north); Cottage Grove (south via East 63rd branch); Ashland/63rd (south via Ashland branch)	29,021
Orange	16	The Loop; Midway (south)	18,541
Pink	22	54th/Cermak (west); The Loop (east)	12,036
Purple	26	Linden (north); Howard (south, shuttle service); The Loop (south, weekday rush hour express service)	6,525
Red	33	Howard (north); 95th/Dan Ryan (south)	141,578
Yellow	3	Dempster–Skokie (west); Howard (east)	1,517

== Stations ==
Key for Chicago "L" stations and planned stations
Symbol	Meaning
Ⓣ	Designated transfer stations within the Chicago "L" system
Metra or South Shore connection	Transfer stations for Metra or South Shore Line
Ⓣ	Transfer stations for Chicago "L", Metra, and South Shore Line
†	Terminal station
Ⓣ † †	Transfer stations and terminals
Disabled access	Accessible
Airport interchange	Airport connection

Key for Metra and South Shore lines
Symbol	Line
BNSF Line	BNSF Line
Heritage Corridor	Heritage Corridor
Metra Electric	Metra Electric District
Milwaukee District North	Milwaukee District North Line
Milwaukee District West	Milwaukee District West Line
North Central Service	North Central Service
Rock Island District	Rock Island District
SouthWest Service	SouthWest Service
Union Pacific North Line	Union Pacific North Line
Union Pacific Northwest Line	Union Pacific Northwest Line
Union Pacific West Line	Union Pacific West Line
	South Shore Line

Rapid transit stations on the Chicago "L"
Station	Lines	Transfers/connections	Location	Opened	Structure	Avg. weekday ridership (May 2026)
18th	Pink	—N/a	Pilsen	April 28, 1896	Elevated	1,335
35th–Bronzeville–IIT	Green	Metra: (at 35th Street)	Bronzeville	June 6, 1892	Elevated	1,191
35th/Archer	Orange	—N/a	McKinley Park	October 31, 1993	Elevated	1,882
43rd	Green	—N/a	Grand Boulevard	August 15, 1892	Elevated	687
47th	Green	—N/a	Legends South	August 15, 1892	Elevated	725
47th	Red	—N/a	Fuller Park	September 28, 1969	Expressway median	2,076
51st	Green	—N/a	Grand Boulevard/ Washington Park	August 28, 1892	Elevated	669
54th/Cermak †	Pink	—N/a	Cicero	August 1, 1912	At-grade	1,778
63rd	Red	—N/a	Englewood	September 28, 1969	Expressway median	1,933
69th	Red	—N/a	Greater Grand Crossing	September 28, 1969	Expressway median	2,994
79th	Red	—N/a	Chatham	September 28, 1969	Expressway median	3,838
87th	Red	—N/a	Garden Homes	September 28, 1969	Expressway median	2,216
95th/Dan Ryan †	Red	—N/a	Roseland	September 28, 1969	Expressway median	6,307
Adams/Wabash Ⓣ	Brown Green Orange Pink Purple	Metra: (at Van Buren Street); SSL: (at Van Buren Street)	The Loop	November 8, 1896	Elevated	5,168
Addison	Blue	—N/a	Avondale/Irving Park	February 1, 1970	Expressway median	2,013
Addison	Brown	—N/a	North Center	May 18, 1907	Elevated	1,436
Addison	Red	—N/a	Wrigleyville	June 6, 1900	Elevated	7,474
Argyle	Red	—N/a	Little Vietnam	May 16, 1908^{[a]}	Elevated	2,136
Armitage	Brown Purple	—N/a	Lincoln Park	June 9, 1900	Elevated	3,430
Ashland	Green Pink	—N/a	Near West Side	November 6, 1893	Elevated	1,914
Ashland/63rd †	Green	—N/a	West Englewood	May 6, 1969	Elevated	724
Ashland	Orange	—N/a	McKinley Park/Lower West Side	October 31, 1993	Elevated	1,289
Austin	Blue	—N/a	Oak Park	March 20, 1960	Cutting	715
Austin	Green	—N/a	Austin	April 15, 1899	Elevated	934
Belmont	Blue	—N/a	Avondale	February 1, 1970	Underground	3,671
Belmont Ⓣ	Brown Purple Red	—N/a	Lake View	May 31, 1900	Elevated	7,999
Berwyn	Red	—N/a	Summerdale	1916	Elevated	1,952
Bryn Mawr	Red	—N/a	Edgewater	May 16, 1908^{[a]}	Elevated	2,836
California	Blue	—N/a	Palmer Square	May 25, 1895	Elevated	3,630
California	Green	—N/a	Smith Park	November 6, 1893	Elevated	790
California	Pink	—N/a	Little Village	March 10, 1902	Elevated	1,033
Central	Green	—N/a	Austin	April 15, 1899	Elevated	1,260
Central	Purple	—N/a	Evanston	May 16, 1908^{[a]}	Elevated	554
Central Park	Pink	—N/a	North Lawndale	December 9, 1951	Elevated	804
Cermak–Chinatown	Red	—N/a	Chinatown	September 28, 1969	Elevated	5,176
Cermak–McCormick Place	Green	—N/a	McCormick Place	June 6, 1892	Elevated	1,725
Chicago	Blue	—N/a	Ukrainian Village	February 25, 1951	Underground	2,105
Chicago	Brown Purple	—N/a	Cabrini Green	May 31, 1900	Elevated	4,314
Chicago	Red	—N/a	Magnificent Mile	October 17, 1943	Underground	7,756
Cicero	Blue	—N/a	Austin	June 22, 1958	Expressway median	592
Cicero	Green	—N/a	Austin	March 3, 1894	Elevated	696
Cicero	Pink	—N/a	Cicero	December 16, 1907	At-grade	775
Clark/Division	Red	—N/a	Gold Coast	October 17, 1943	Underground	5,572
Clark/Lake Ⓣ	Blue Brown Green Orange Pink Purple	—N/a	City Hall	September 22, 1895/ February 25, 1951	Elevated/underground	13,232
Clinton	Blue	Metra: (at Union)	Union Station	June 22, 1958	Underground	2,087
Clinton Ⓣ	Green Pink	Metra: (at Ogilvie TC)	West Loop	October 16, 1909	Elevated	2,861
Conservatory–Central Park Drive	Green	—N/a	East Garfield Park	June 30, 2001	Elevated	572
Cottage Grove †	Green	—N/a	Woodlawn	April 23, 1893	Elevated	794
Cumberland	Blue	—N/a	Schorsch Forest View	February 27, 1983	Expressway median	2,441
Damen	Blue	—N/a	Wicker Park	May 6, 1895	Elevated	4,481
Damen	Brown	Metra: (at Ravenswood)	Ravenswood	May 18, 1907	Elevated	1,792
Damen	Green	–	Near West Side	August 5, 2024	Elevated	933
Damen	Pink	—N/a	Heart of Chicago	September 7, 1896	Elevated	1,303
Davis	Purple	Metra: (at Davis Street/Evanston); Pace Pulse: ■ Dempster Line	Evanston	May 16, 1908^{[a]}	Elevated	2,250
Dempster	Purple	—N/a	Evanston	May 16, 1908^{[a]}	Elevated	537
Dempster–Skokie †	Yellow	Pace Pulse: ■ Dempster Line	Skokie	March 28, 1925	At-grade	1,027
Diversey	Brown Purple	—N/a	Lincoln Park	June 9, 1900	Elevated	3,673
Division	Blue	—N/a	Pulaski Park	February 25, 1951	Underground	4,297
Forest Park †	Blue	—N/a	Forest Park	March 11, 1905 ^{[c]}	Elevated	1,175
Foster	Purple	—N/a	Evanston	January 6, 1909	Elevated	592
Francisco	Brown	—N/a	Albany Park	December 14, 1907	At-grade	990
Fullerton Ⓣ	Brown Purple Red	—N/a	Lincoln Park	May 31, 1900	Elevated	9,793
Garfield Ⓣ	Green	—N/a	Washington Park	October 12, 1892	Elevated	895
Garfield	Red	—N/a	Canaryville	September 28, 1969	Expressway median	2,395
Grand	Blue	—N/a	West Town	February 25, 1951	Underground	2,790
Grand	Red	—N/a	River North	October 17, 1943	Underground	6,957
Granville	Red	—N/a	Granville Homes	May 16, 1908^{[a]}	Elevated	2,268
Halsted	Green	—N/a	Englewood	December 24, 1906	Elevated	390
Halsted	Orange	—N/a	Bridgeport	October 31, 1993	Elevated	1,589
Harlem	Blue	—N/a	Forest Park	March 20, 1960	Cutting	398
Harlem	Blue	—N/a	Norwood Park	February 27, 1983	Expressway median	1,697
Harlem/Lake †	Green	Metra: (at Oak Park)	Oak Park	October 28, 1962	Elevated	2,262
Harold Washington Library State/Van Buren Ⓣ	Brown Orange Pink Purple	Blue (at Jackson); Red (at Jackson); Metra: (at Van Buren Street); SSL: (at Van Buren Street)	The Loop	June 22, 1997	Elevated	2,640
Harrison	Red	—N/a	South Loop	October 17, 1943	Underground	2,358
Howard Ⓣ †	Red Purple Yellow	—N/a	Dubkin Park	May 16, 1908	Elevated	3,516
Illinois Medical District	Blue	—N/a	Near West Side	June 22, 1958	Expressway median	1,461
Indiana	Green	—N/a	Grand Boulevard	August 15, 1892	Elevated	529
Irving Park	Blue	Metra: (at Irving Park)	Irving Park	February 1, 1970	Expressway median	2,896
Irving Park	Brown	—N/a	North Center	May 18, 1907	Elevated	1,862
Jackson Ⓣ	Blue	Red (at Jackson); Brown Orange Pink Purple (at Library)	The Loop	February 25, 1951	Underground	4,353
Jackson Ⓣ	Red	Blue (at Jackson); Brown Orange Pink Purple (at Library)	Printers Row	October 17, 1943	Underground	4,969
Jarvis	Red	—N/a	Rogers Park	May 16, 1908^{[a]}	Elevated	1,117
Jefferson Park	Blue	Metra: Pace Pulse: ■ Milwaukee Line	Jefferson Park	February 1, 1970	Expressway median	4,687
Kedzie	Brown	—N/a	Albany Park	December 14, 1907	At-grade	1,472
Kedzie	Green	Metra: (at Kedzie)	East Garfield Park	November 6, 1893	Elevated	774
Kedzie	Orange	—N/a	Brighton Park	October 31, 1993	Elevated	2,399
Kedzie	Pink	—N/a	North Lawndale	March 10, 1902	Elevated	822
Kedzie–Homan	Blue	—N/a	East Garfield Park	June 22, 1958	Expressway median	896
Kimball †	Brown	—N/a	Budlong Woods	December 14, 1907	At-grade	2,524
King Drive	Green	—N/a	Woodlawn	May 1, 1893	Elevated	330
Kostner	Pink	—N/a	North Lawndale	May 22, 1907	At-grade	297
Lake Ⓣ	Red	Blue (at Washington); Brown Green Orange Pink Purple (at State/Lake)	The Loop	November 18, 1997	Underground	10,841
Laramie	Green	—N/a	Austin	April 23, 1894	Elevated	697
LaSalle	Blue	Metra: (at LaSalle Street)	The Loop	February 25, 1951	Underground	1,720
LaSalle/Van Buren	Brown Orange Pink Purple	Metra: (at LaSalle Street)	The Loop	October 3, 1897	Elevated	2,047
Lawrence	Red	—N/a	Uptown	February 27, 1923	Elevated	2,041
Linden †	Purple	—N/a	Wilmette	April 2, 1912	At-grade	708
Logan Square	Blue	—N/a	Logan Square	February 1, 1970	Underground	4,950
Loyola	Red	—N/a	Loyola University	May 16, 1908^{[a]}	Elevated	3,066
Main	Purple	Metra: (at Main Street/Evanston)	Evanston	May 16, 1908^{[a]}	Elevated	716
Merchandise Mart Ⓣ	Brown Purple	—N/a	Near North Side	December 5, 1930	Elevated	5,303
Midway †	Orange	—N/a	Garfield Ridge	October 31, 1993	At-grade	5,381
Monroe	Blue	—N/a	The Loop	February 25, 1951	Underground	3,874
Monroe	Red	—N/a	The Loop	October 17, 1943	Underground	4,410
Montrose	Blue	Metra: (at Mayfair)	Irving Park/Portage Park	February 1, 1970	Expressway median	1,700
Montrose	Brown	—N/a	Ravenswood	May 18, 1907	Elevated	1,634
Morgan	Green Pink	—N/a	Near West Side	November 6, 1893	Elevated	4,095
Morse	Red	—N/a	Touhy Park	May 16, 1908^{[a]}	Elevated	2,810
North/Clybourn	Red	—N/a	Goose Island	October 17, 1943	Underground	3,543
Noyes	Purple	—N/a	Evanston	May 16, 1908^{[a]}	Elevated	708
O'Hare †	Blue	O'Hare: ATS Airport Transit System	O'Hare	September 3, 1984	Underground	10,375
Oak Park	Blue	—N/a	Oak Park	March 20, 1960	Cutting	641
Oak Park	Green	—N/a	Oak Park	January 25, 1901	Elevated	802
Oakton–Skokie	Yellow	—N/a	Skokie	March 28, 1925	At-grade	490
Paulina	Brown	—N/a	Roscoe Village	May 18, 1907	Elevated	1,842
Polk	Pink	—N/a	Illinois Medical District	April 28, 1896	Elevated	2,249
Pulaski	Blue	—N/a	West Garfield Park	June 22, 1958	Expressway median	630
Pulaski	Green	—N/a	West Garfield Park	March 1894	Elevated	910
Pulaski	Orange	—N/a	Archer Heights/ West Elsdon	October 31, 1993	Elevated	3,365
Pulaski	Pink	—N/a	North Lawndale	June 16, 1902	Elevated	733
Quincy	Brown Orange Pink Purple	Metra: (at Union)	The Loop	October 3, 1897	Elevated	5,410
Racine	Blue	—N/a	Near West Side	June 22, 1958	Expressway median	882
Ridgeland	Green	—N/a	Oak Park	January 25, 1901	Elevated	862
Rockwell	Brown	—N/a	Lincoln Square	December 14, 1907	At-grade	1,141
Roosevelt Ⓣ	Green Orange Red	—N/a	Near South Side	June 6, 1892/October 17, 1943	Elevated/underground	7,535
Rosemont	Blue	—N/a	Rosemont	February 27, 1983	Expressway median	4,102
Sedgwick	Brown Purple	—N/a	Old Town	May 31, 1900	Elevated	2,800
Sheridan	Red	—N/a	Buena Park	May 31, 1900	Elevated	2,918
South Boulevard	Purple	—N/a	Evanston	July 1, 1931	Elevated	460
Southport	Brown	—N/a	Lake View	May 18, 1907	Elevated	2,420
Sox–35th	Red	Metra: (at 35th Street)	Armour Square	September 28, 1969	Expressway median	4,176
State/Lake Ⓣ	Brown Green Orange Pink Purple	Red (at Lake)	Millennium Park	September 22, 1895	Elevated	0
Thorndale	Red	—N/a	Winchester Hood	February 14, 1915	Elevated	1,841
UIC–Halsted	Blue	—N/a	Greektown	June 22, 1958	Expressway median	2,435
Washington Ⓣ	Blue	Red (at Lake)	The Loop	February 25, 1951	Underground	8,563
Washington/Wabash	Brown Green Orange Pink Purple	Metra: (at Millennium Station); SSL: (at Millennium Station)	The Loop	August 31, 2017	Elevated	10,448
Washington/Wells Ⓣ	Brown Orange Pink Purple	Metra: (at Ogilvie TC)	The Loop	July 17, 1995	Elevated	5,712
Wellington	Brown Purple	—N/a	Lake View	May 31, 1900	Elevated	2,127
Western	Blue	—N/a	Bucktown	May 25, 1895	Elevated	3,657
Western	Blue	—N/a	Tri-Taylor	June 22, 1958	Expressway median	611
Western	Brown	—N/a	Lincoln Square	May 18, 1907	Elevated	1,880
Western	Orange	—N/a	Brighton Park/ Gage Park/New City	October 31, 1993	Elevated	2,636
Western	Pink	—N/a	Lower West Side	September 7, 1896	Elevated	907
Wilson Ⓣ	Purple Red	—N/a	Montrose Beach	May 31, 1900	Elevated	4,759

=== Gallery ===
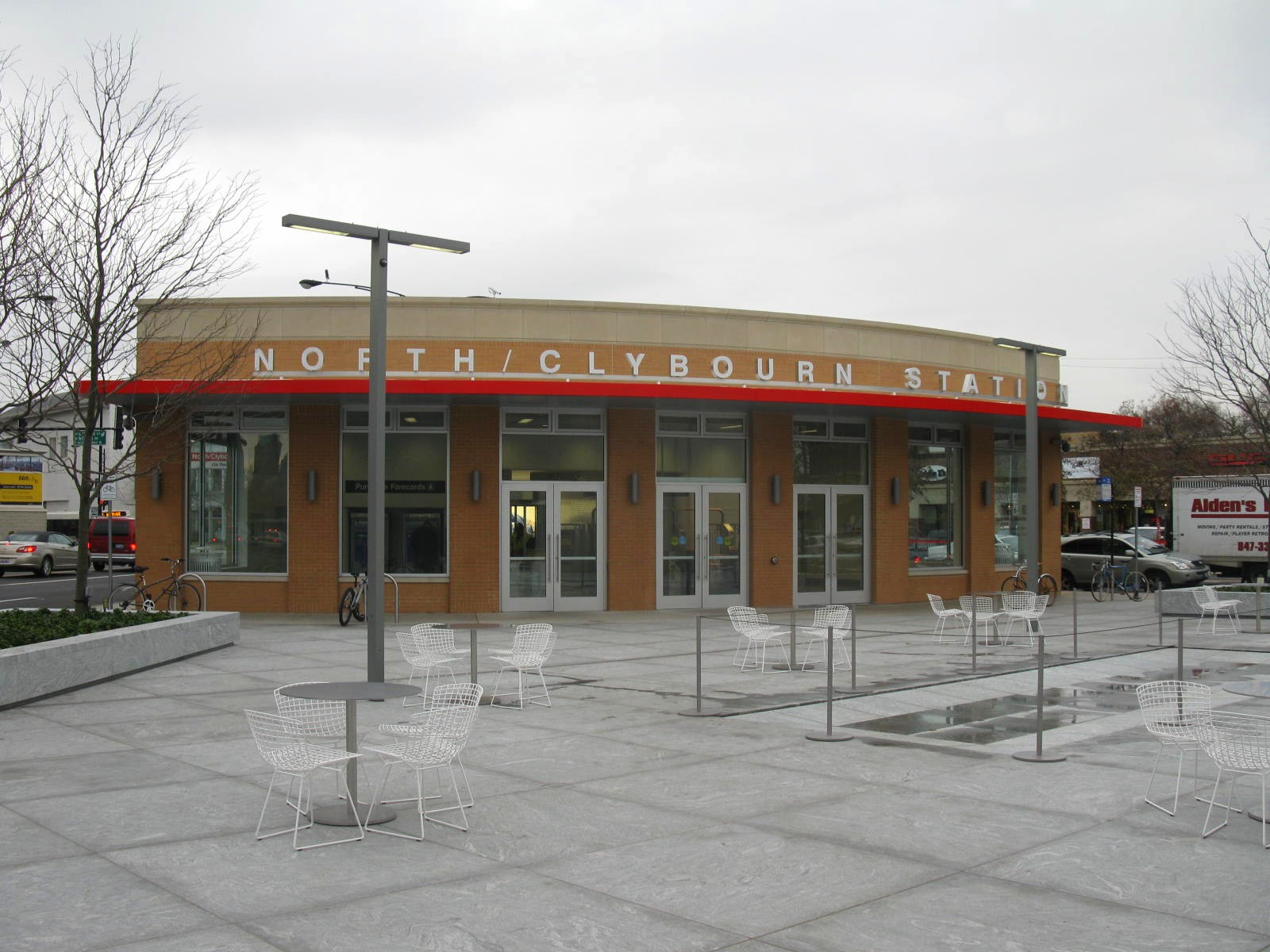
North/Clybourn is the only station on the Red Line's subway component with fare controls above ground

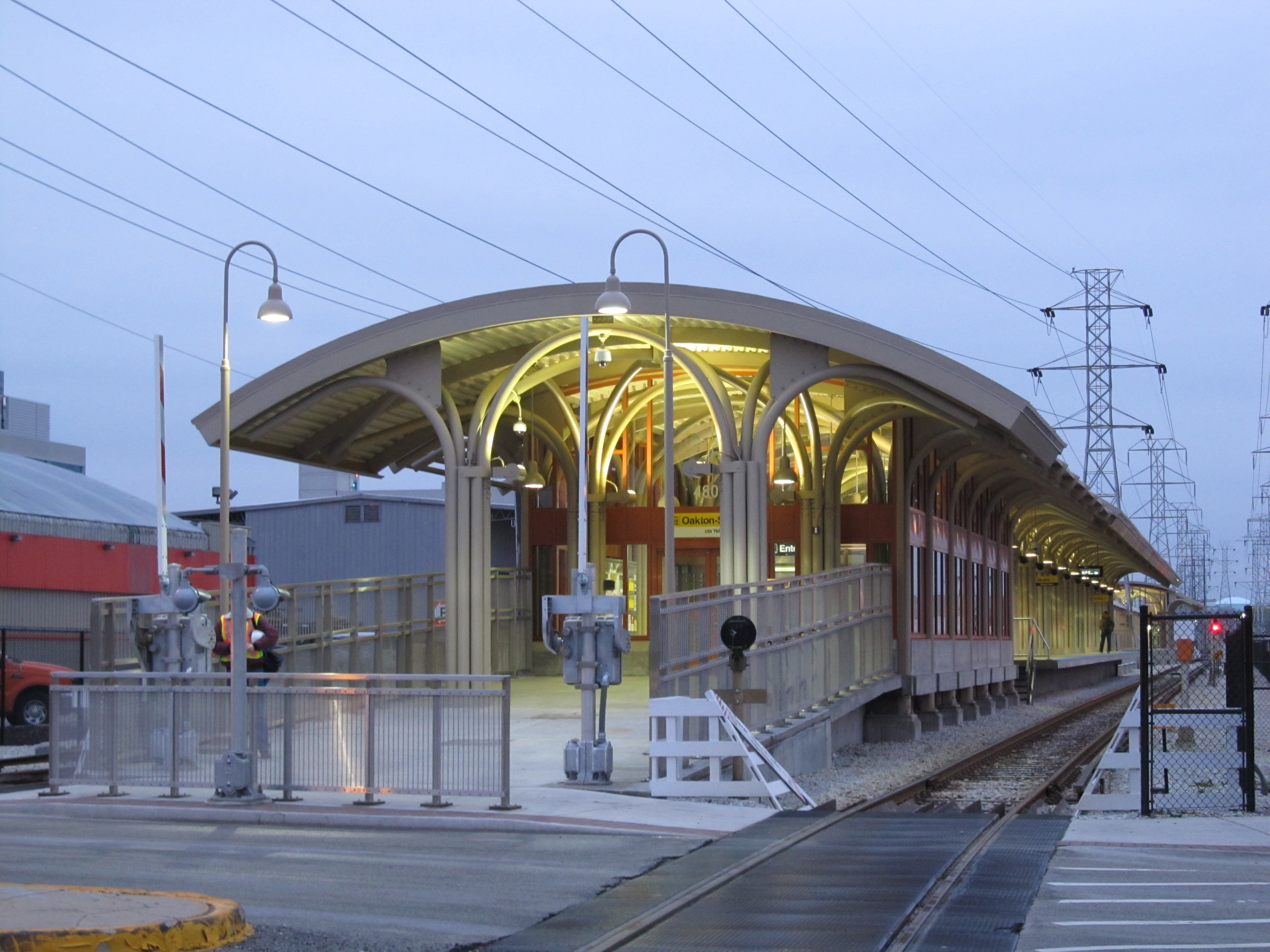
One of several stations built on ground level, Oakton–Skokie has head houses built at each end

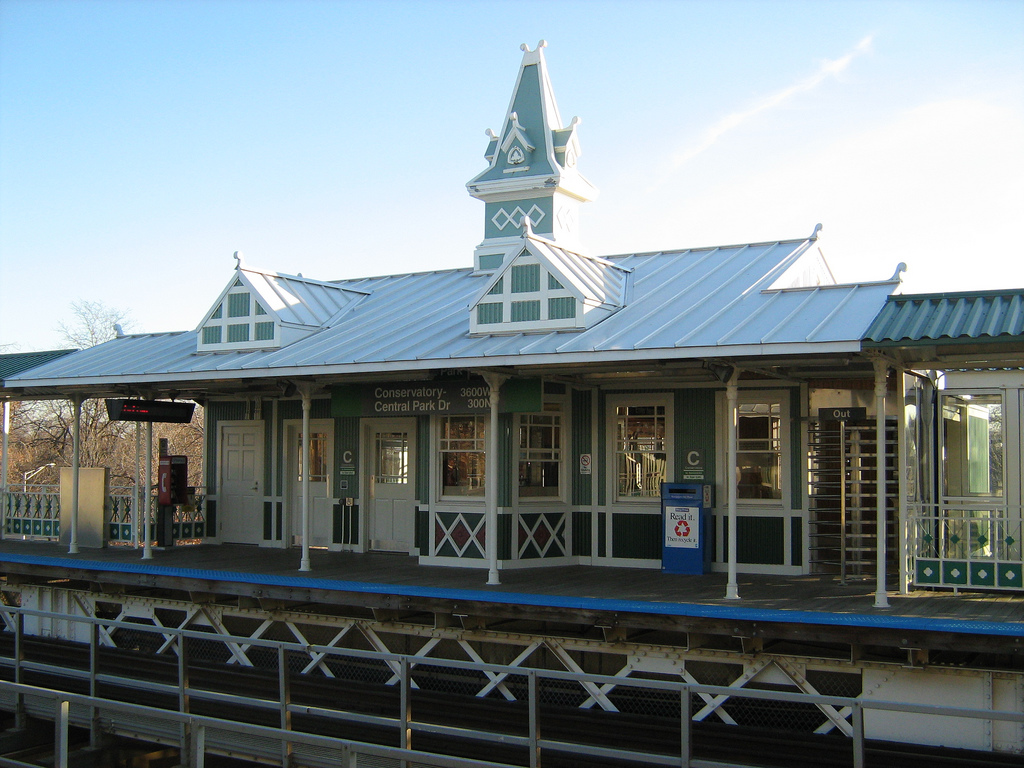
The twin head houses of Conservatory–Central Park Drive date back to 1894

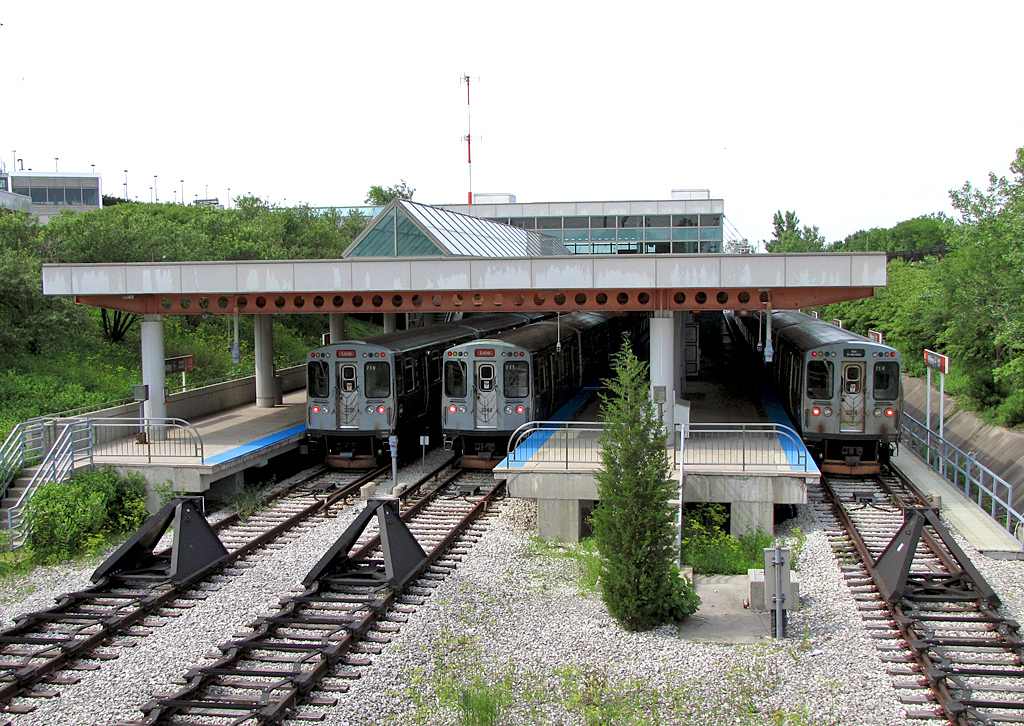
The Midway terminal features both an island platform and a side platform

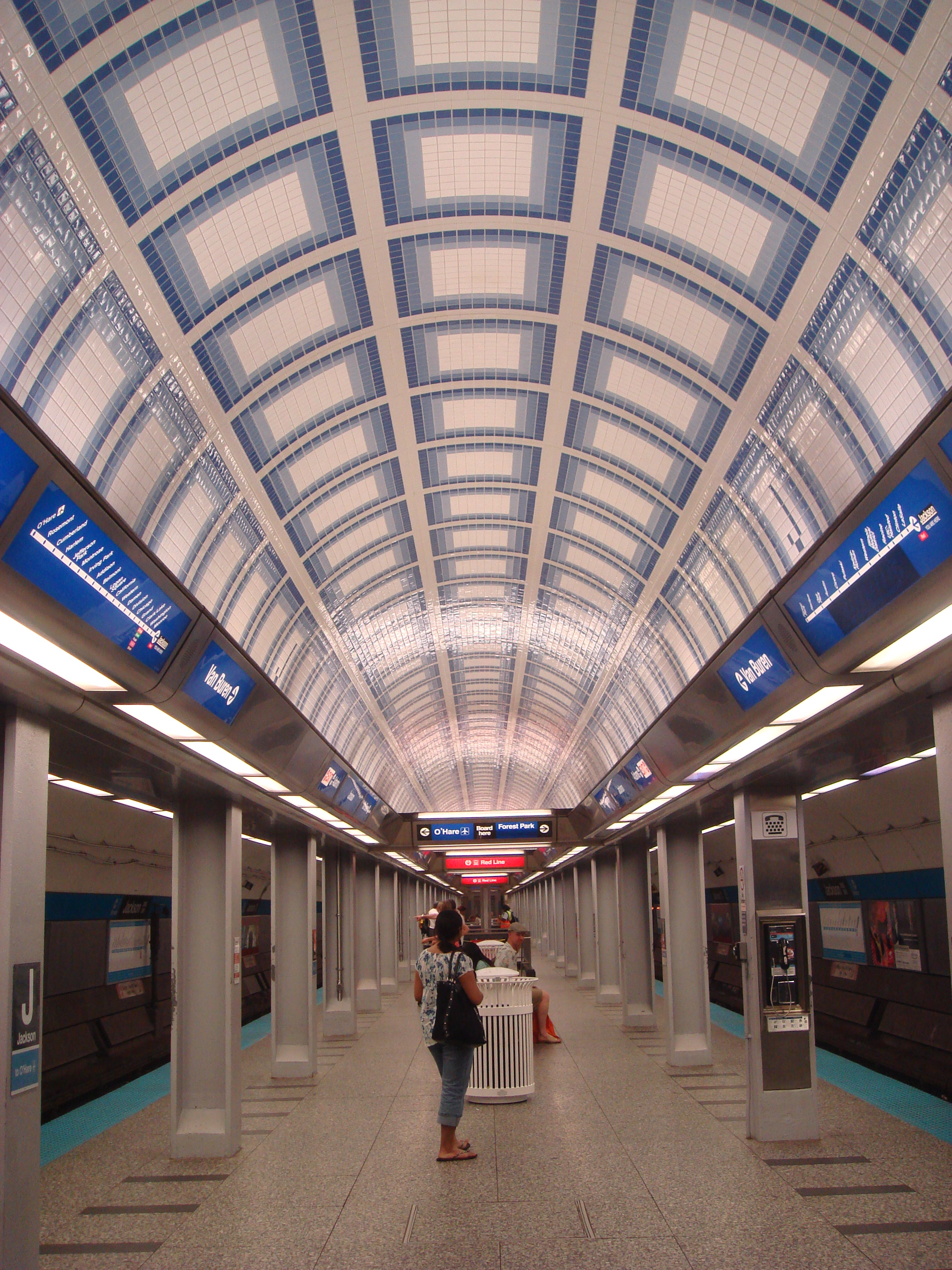
The island platform at Jackson conforms to the same structure that all the subway platforms in the Loop have

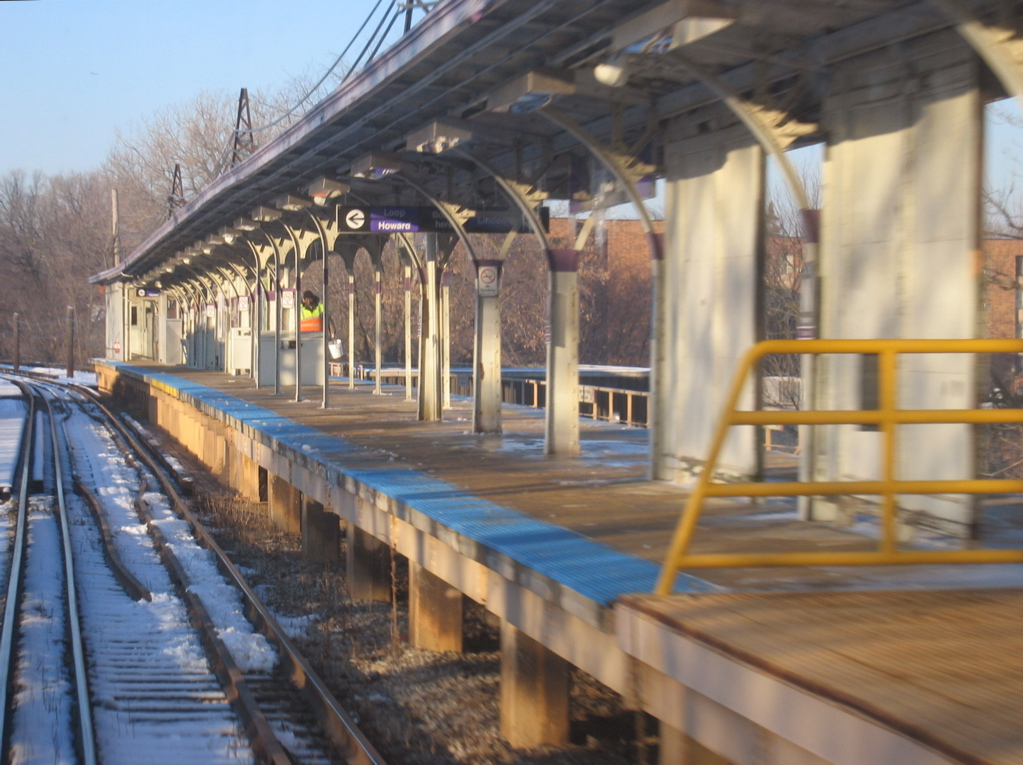
Noyes, unlike most stations, has a platform that is only long enough for six cars instead of the usual eight

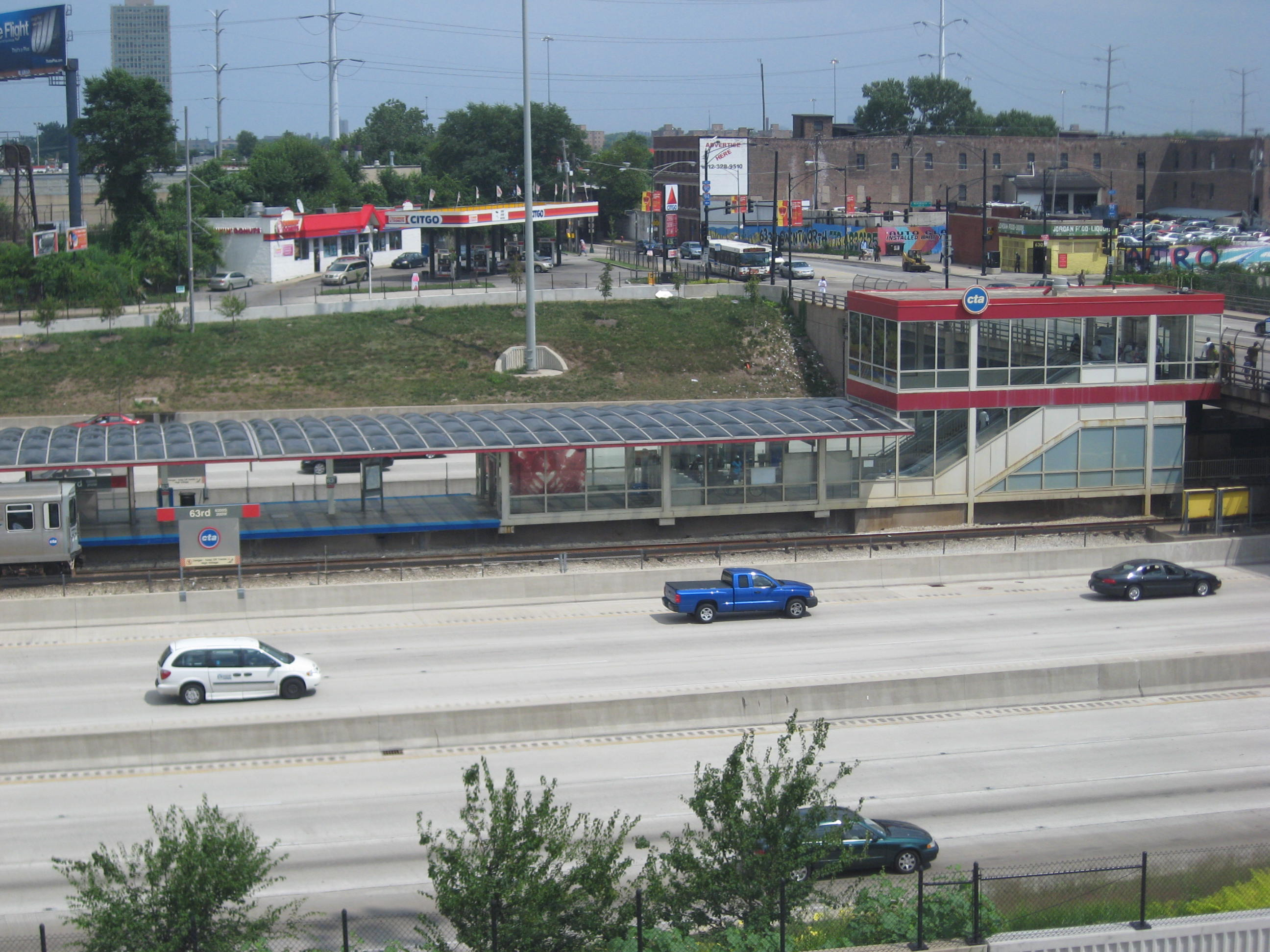
Pedestrian access to 63rd is from the bridge spanning the Dan Ryan expressway. Most stations built in highway medians on the Chicago "L" are reached in this way

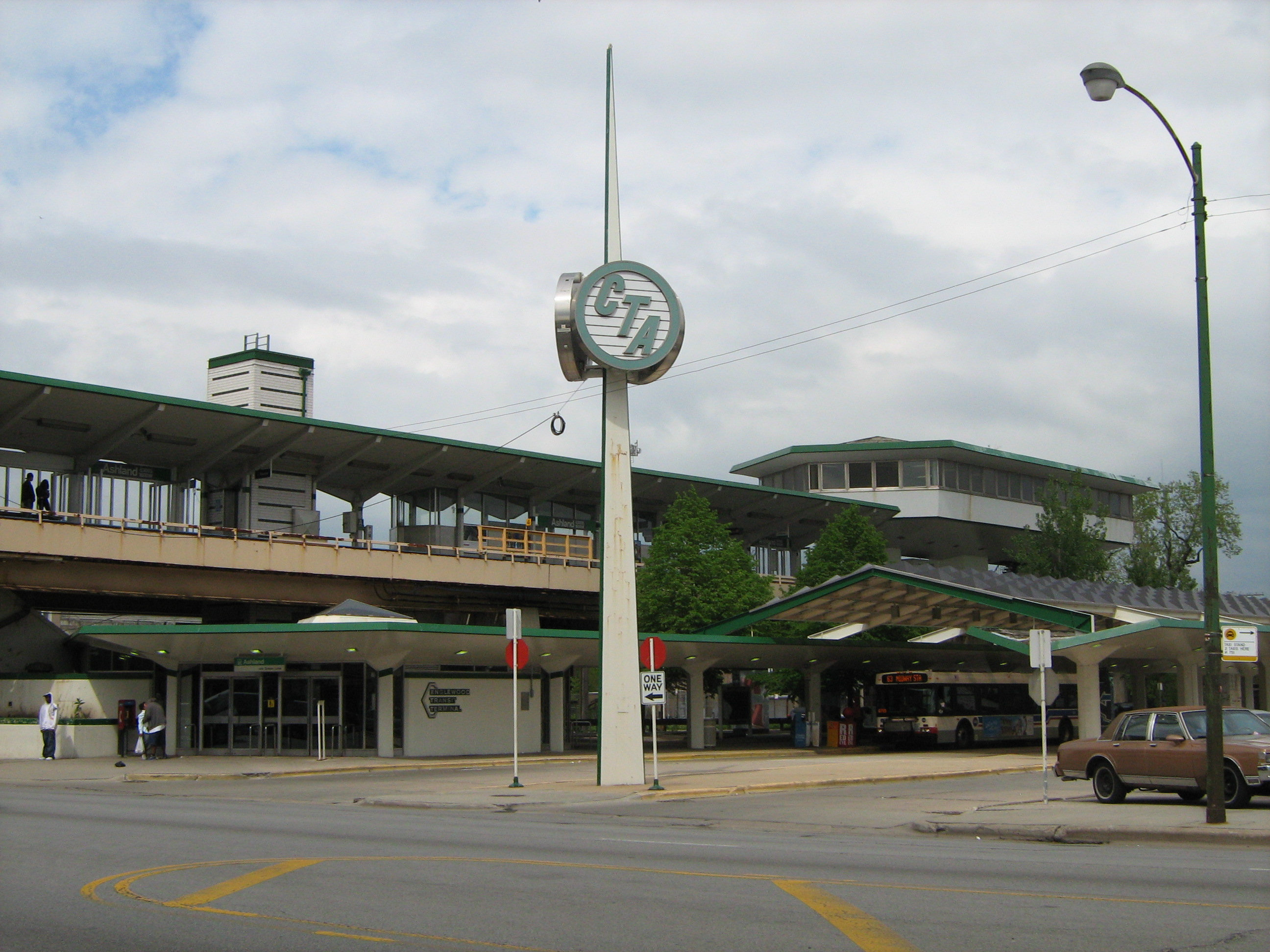
Like many stations, Ashland/63rd is an elevated station. Accessibility is provided via an elevator to the station's platform

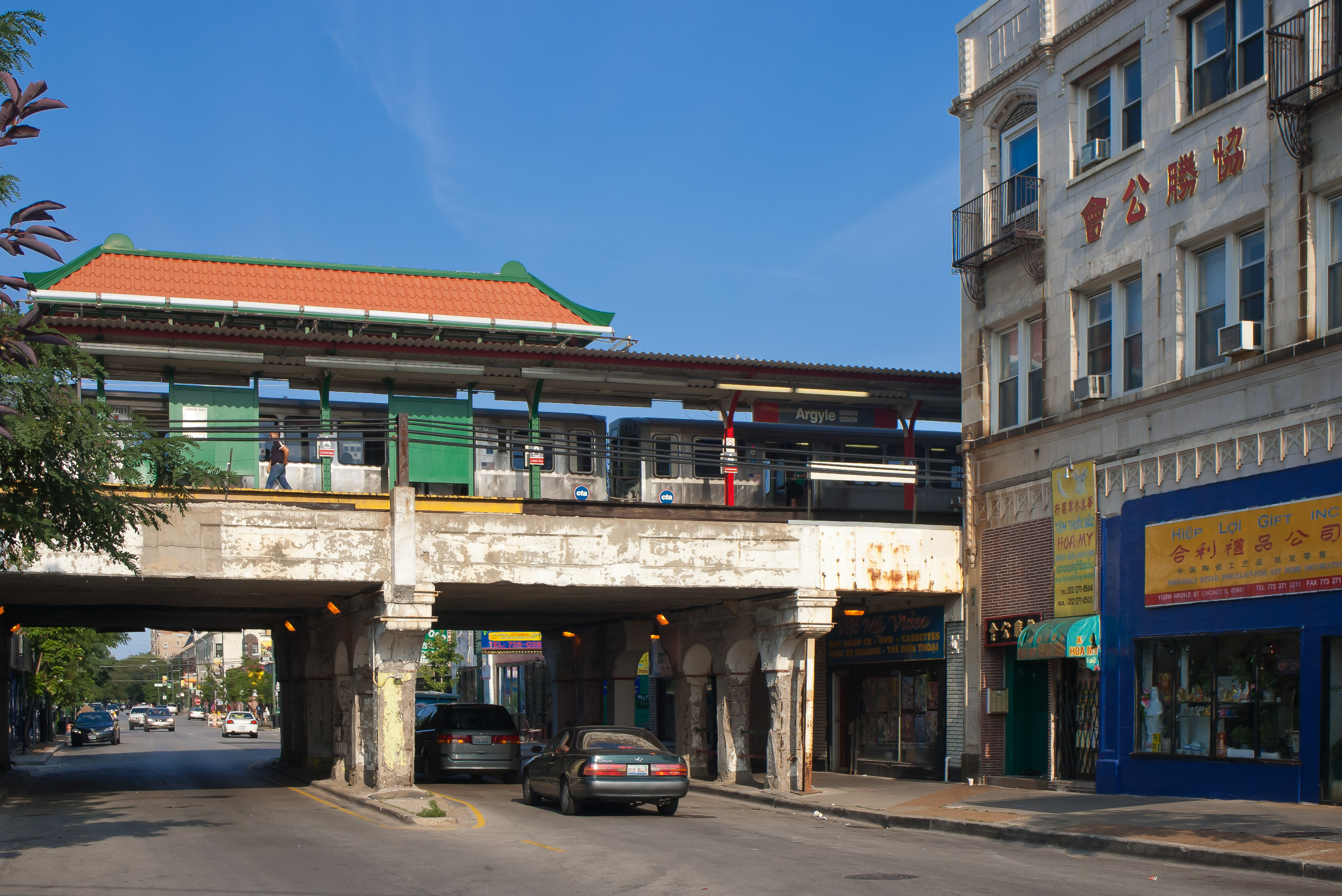
Argyle was one of several stations built on a concrete embankment. The station was torn down and rebuilt with a modern concrete viaduct in 2025

== Planned stations ==
Planned rapid transit stations on the Chicago "L"
Station	Lines	Transfers/ Connections	Location	Opening	Structure
103rd	Red	—N/a	Roseland/Washington Heights	2030	Elevated
111th	Red	—N/a	Roseland	2030	Elevated
Michigan	Red	—N/a	West Pullman	2030	Elevated
130th †	Red	—N/a	Riverdale	2030	At-grade
Central	Blue	—N/a	Austin	2031	Elevated
Racine	Green	—N/a	Englewood	2031	Elevated

== Notes ==
- ^{a} On May 16, 1908, the Northwestern Elevated Railroad's rapid transit service replaced the service of the Milwaukee Road's Evanston branch north of Sheridan Park (Wilson Avenue). Stations noted existed prior to the start of "L" service.
- ^{b} Clark/Lake is listed twice because the elevated and subway sections opened as separate stations in 1895 and 1951, respectively.
- ^{c} Forest Park existed as an interurban station on the Aurora Elgin and Chicago Railway prior to the start of "L" service. March 11, 1905, is the day the Metropolitan West Side Elevated Railroad began operating over the tracks of the AE&C and "L" service began.
