= 14th Place station =

Rapid transit station in Chicago, 1896–1951

14TH PL. 1400S 1700W

General information
- Coordinates: 41.862288°N 87.669321°W
- Line: Douglas Park branch
- Platforms: 2 side platforms
- Tracks: 2

Construction
- Structure type: Elevated

History
- Opened: April 28, 1896
- Closed: December 9, 1951

Passengers
- 1950: 57,484 ▼42.47% (CTA)

Former services
Preceding station	Chicago "L"	Following station
18th toward Oak Park	Douglas branch	Roosevelt toward Marshfield
Location

14th Place was a rapid transit station on the Chicago "L"'s Douglas Park branch between 1896 and 1951. Constructed by the Metropolitan West Side Elevated Railroad, it was one of the first stations opened on the branch in April 1896.

== History ==
The Douglas Park branch opened on April 28, 1896, significantly later than the other branches of the Metropolitan West Side Elevated Railroad. One of its stations was located on 14th Place.

Douglas service was significantly streamlined on December 9, 1951, part of the Chicago Transit Authority (CTA)'s broader overhaul of the Metropolitan's lines. Skip-stop was instituted on the Douglas and Garfield branches, and several low-performing stations on the Douglas branch were closed, including 14th Place.

=== Accidents and incidents ===
On the night of March 13, 1897, two men attempted to kill Thomas H. Tyrrell, the station agent at 14th Place. They fired a bullet at Tyrrell's head, but a wire in the agent booth's screen caught and split it. Tyrrell survived, but the bullet cut his left ear and the left side of his face was powder burned. This incident was thought to be retaliation for an incident two days prior, in which one of the assailants demanded money from Tyrrell but fled when Tyrrell produced a revolver.

== Station details ==
=== Design and infrastructure ===
The 14th Place station was similar to other stations on the Douglas branch, with a brick Craftsman-style station house at street level. It had two wooden side platforms with cast-iron canopies with hipped roofs of corrugated, in common with the other stations on the Metropolitan's lines.

=== Ridership ===
Ridership at 14th Place peaked at 467,877 passengers in 1907, a year that also saw the peak of every stations' ridership between 12th and Hoyne, inclusive. Ridership last exceeded 400,000 passengers in 1911, 300,000 in 1926, 200,000 in 1930, and 100,000 in 1948.

In its last full year of operation, 1950, 14th Place served 57,484 riders, a decline of 42.47 percent from the 99,926 in 1949. For the part of 1951 it was open, the station had a ridership of 40,752. Its 1951 performance made it the lowest-ridership station on the branch except for Central Park, which opened on December 9 alongside the station's closure, and Kenton, which had no direct street access and served a railway instead of an actual street.

== Works cited ==
- CTA Rail Entrance, Annual Traffic, 1900–1979 (Report). Chicago: Chicago Transit Authority. October 1, 1979.
