= 50th Avenue station =

Chicago rapid transit station, 1910–1978

50TH AVENUE 2200S 5000W
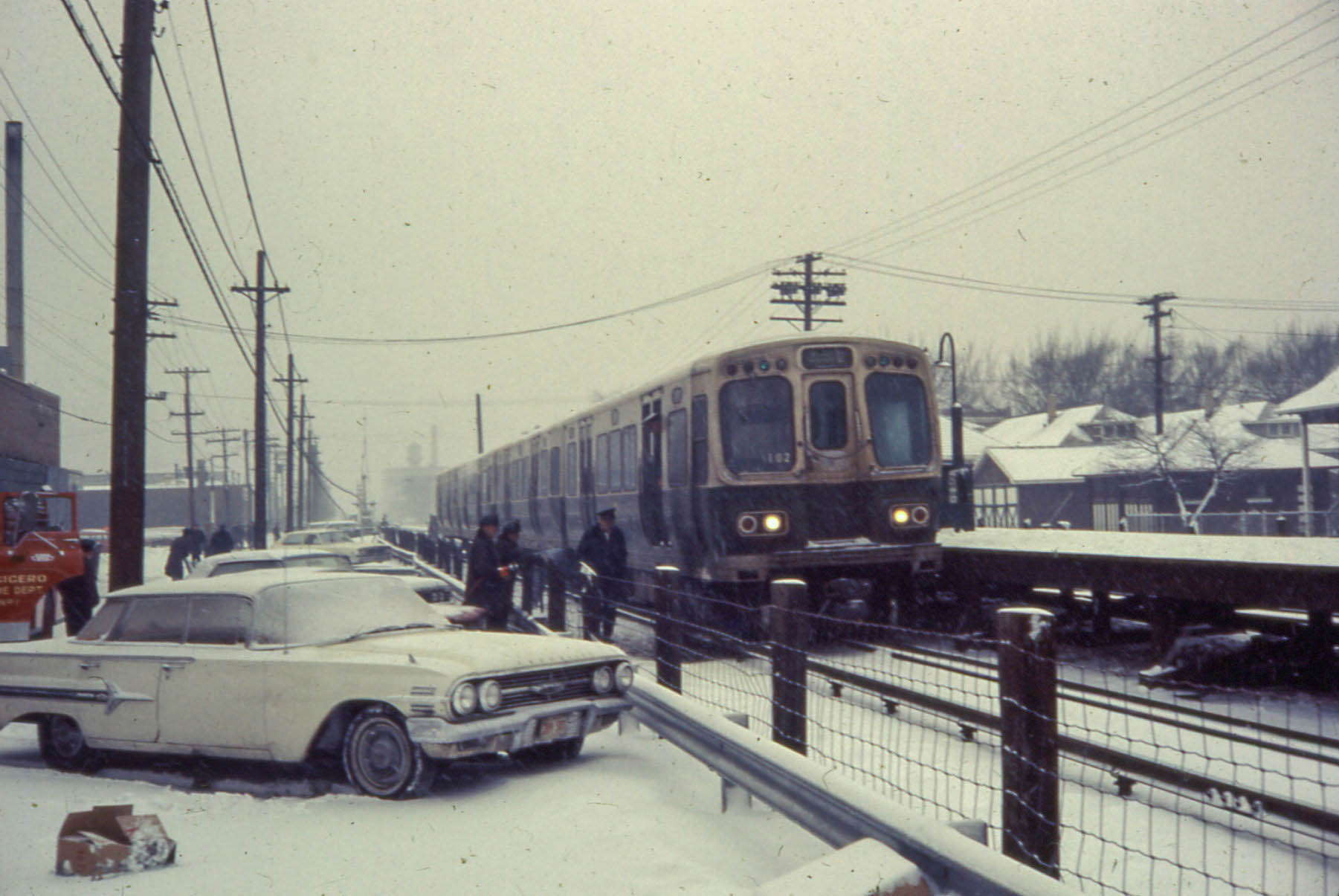
- A train of 2000 series cars at the 50th Avenue station in 1968

General information
- Location: 50th Avenue and 21st Place; Cicero, Illinois
- Coordinates: 41.851879°N 87.749195°W
- Owner: Chicago Transit Authority
- Line: Douglas Branch
- Platforms: 1 island platform
- Tracks: 2 tracks

Construction
- Structure type: At-grade

History
- Opened: August 16, 1910
- Closed: 1978

Former services
Preceding station	Chicago "L"	Following station
Laramie toward Oak Park	Douglas branch	Cicero toward Marshfield
Location

50th Avenue was a Chicago 'L' station on the Douglas branch of the Chicago Transit Authority's West-Northwest Route, currently known as the Pink Line. The station was located at 50th Avenue and 21st Place in west suburban Cicero. It opened on August 16, 1910, as part of an extension of service of the Metropolitan West Side Elevated Railroad to Laramie. The station closed in 1978 and the structure was moved to the Illinois Railway Museum where it is preserved.
