= Laramie station (CTA Douglas branch) =

Laramie 5200W 2200S
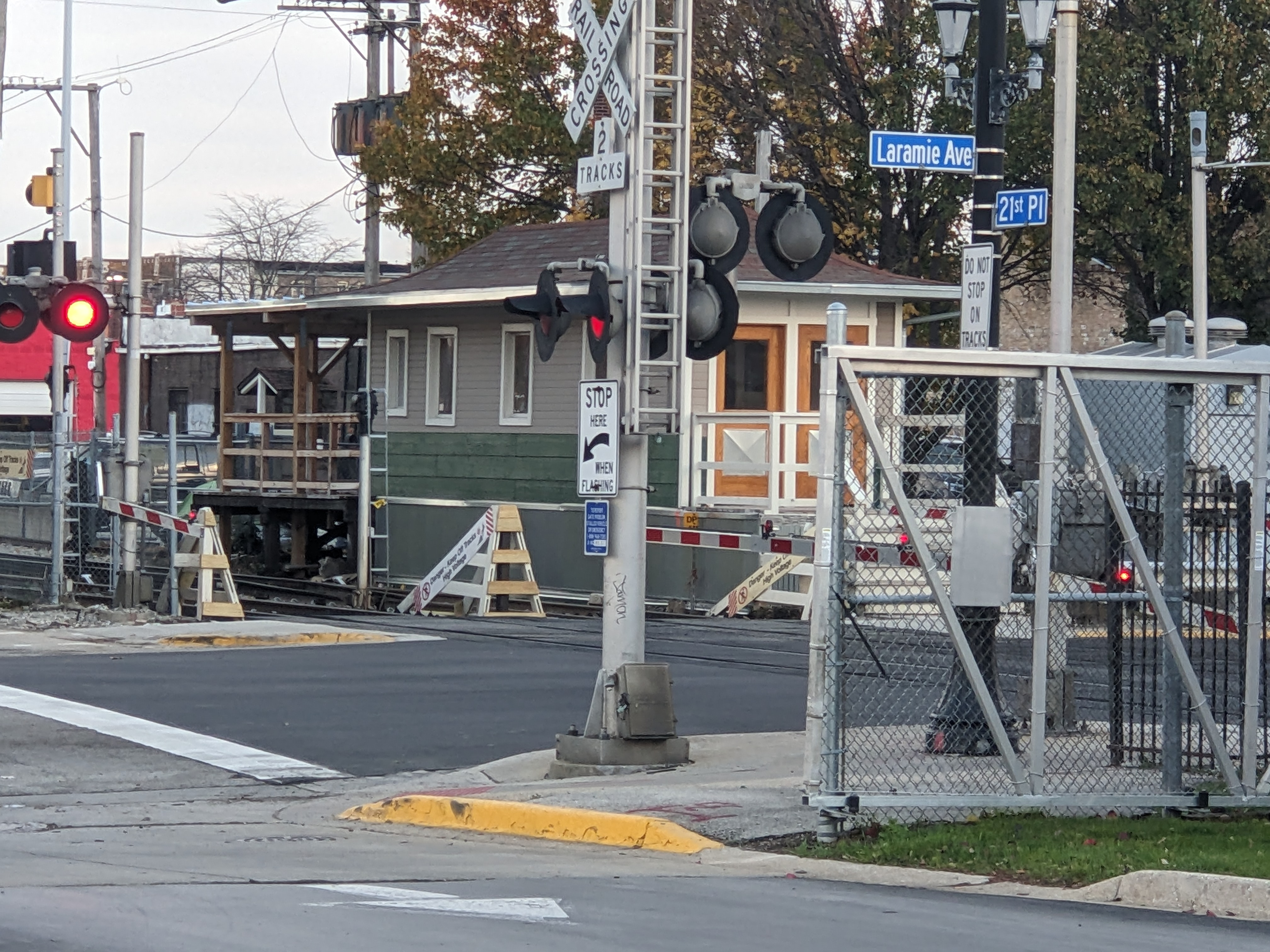
- Laramie's station house in 2024

General information
- Location: 2130 South Laramie Avenue; Cicero, Illinois 60804
- Coordinates: 41.8518°N 87.7538°W
- Owner: Chicago Transit Authority
- Line: Douglas Branch
- Platforms: 1 island platform
- Tracks: 2

Construction
- Structure type: Street Level

History
- Opened: August 16, 1910; February 25, 2002 (Reopened as temporary terminal)
- Closed: February 9, 1992 (Removed from service); August 16, 2003 (Abandoned)
- Former names: 52nd Avenue

Former services
| Preceding station | Chicago "L" | Following station |
|---|---|---|
| 54th/Cermak toward Oak Park | Douglas branch | 50th Avenue Closed 1978 toward Marshfield |
as a temporary terminal station (2002–2003)
| Terminus | Blue Line Cermak branch | Cicero toward O'Hare |
Location

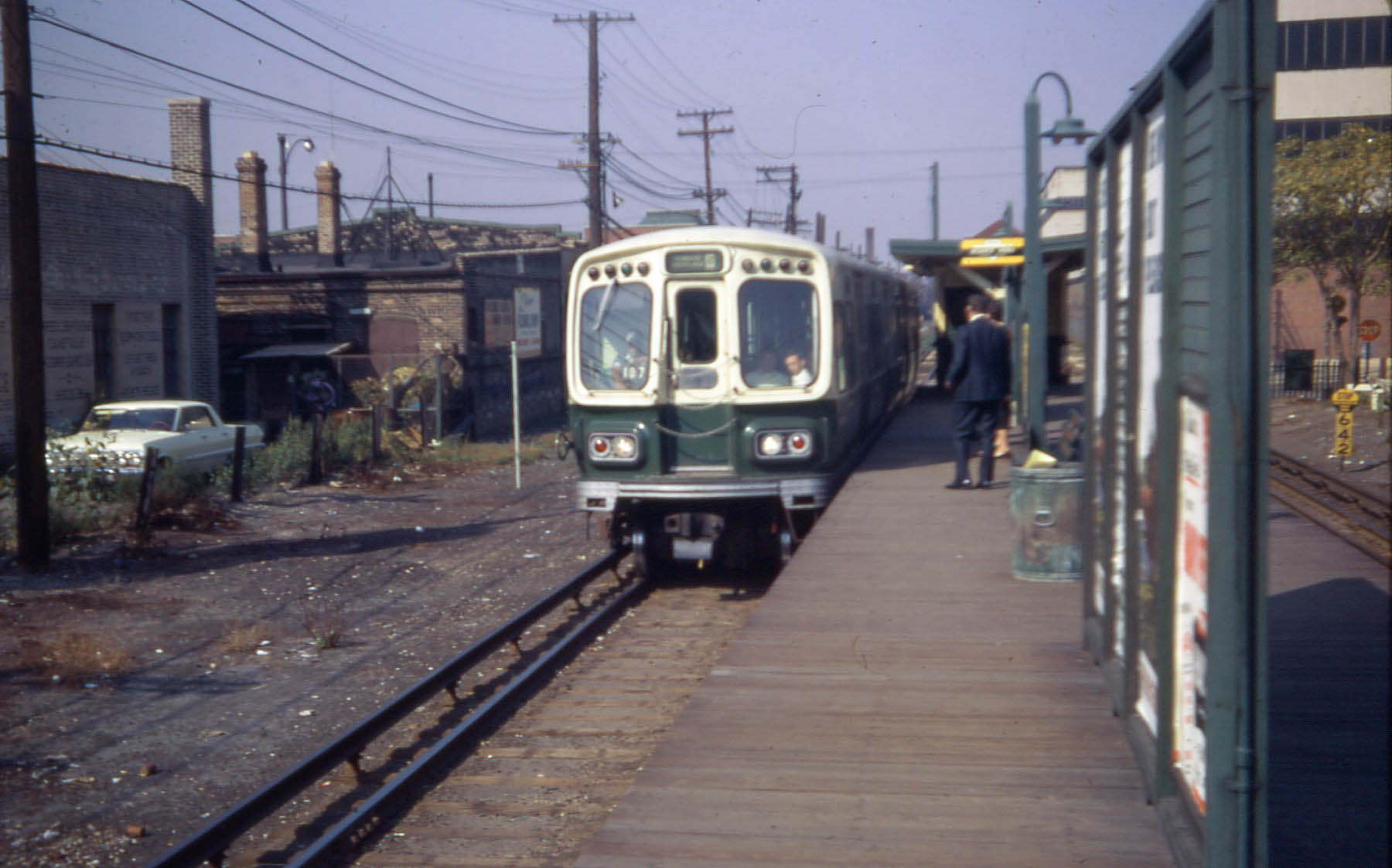
The station in 1967

Laramie is a former station on the Chicago Transit Authority's "L" system on the Douglas Branch while it was a branch of the West-Northwest Line. The station closed on February 9, 1992, because of service cuts that resulted from budget problems. The station was temporarily put back into service on February 25, 2002, for the Douglas Rehabilitation Project while the terminal at 54th/Cermak station was being rebuilt and relocated from the west side of 54th Avenue to the east side. The station was closed again on August 16, 2003, before the new station at 54th/Cermak opened two days later on August 18, 2003. However, the station was never demolished because it was considered historic. Today, Laramie Avenue is serviced by the Pink Line at 54th/Cermak station.
