= 18th station =

Rapid transit station in Chicago

18th 1800S 1700W
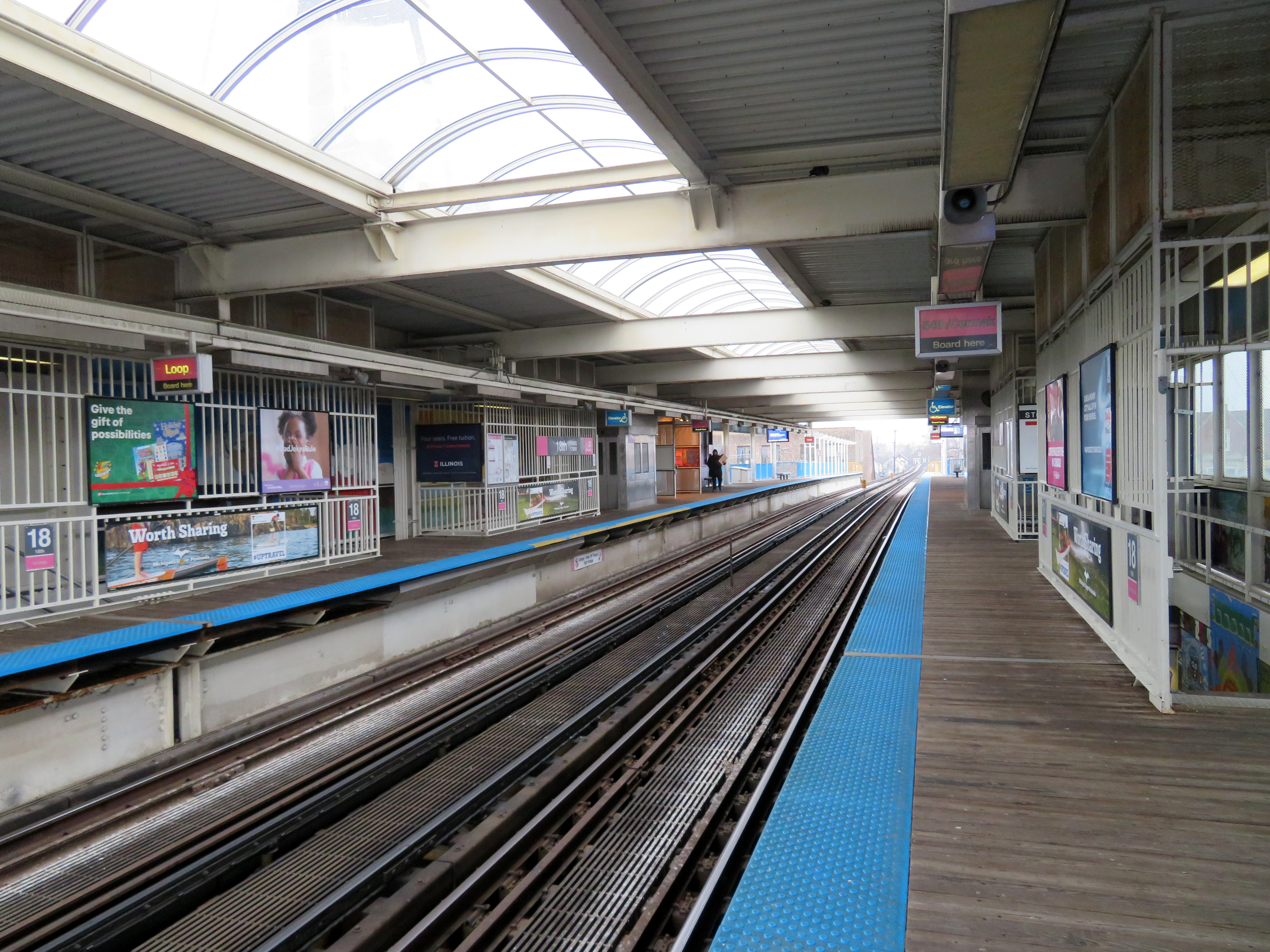

General information
- Location: 1710 West 18th Street; Chicago, Illinois 60608
- Coordinates: 41.857955°N 87.669178°W
- Owner: Chicago Transit Authority
- Line: Cermak Branch
- Platforms: 2 side platforms
- Tracks: 2

Construction
- Structure type: Elevated
- Cycle facilities: Yes
- Accessible: Yes

History
- Opened: April 28, 1896; 130 years ago
- Rebuilt: 1991–1993; 33 years ago

Passengers
- 2025: 443,250 ▲1.1%

Services
Preceding station	Chicago "L"	Following station
Damen toward 54th/Cermak	Pink Line	Polk toward Loop (Clark/Lake)
Former services
Preceding station	Chicago "L"	Following station
Damen toward 54th/Cermak	Blue Line Cermak branch	Polk toward O'Hare
Wood Closed 1957 toward Oak Park	Douglas branch	14th Place Closed 1951 toward Marshfield
Track layout
Location

18th is an 'L' station on the CTA's Pink Line located at 1710 West 18th Street in the Pilsen neighborhood of Chicago, Illinois. The station is decorated with colorful murals painted by local artists from Pilsen.

== History ==
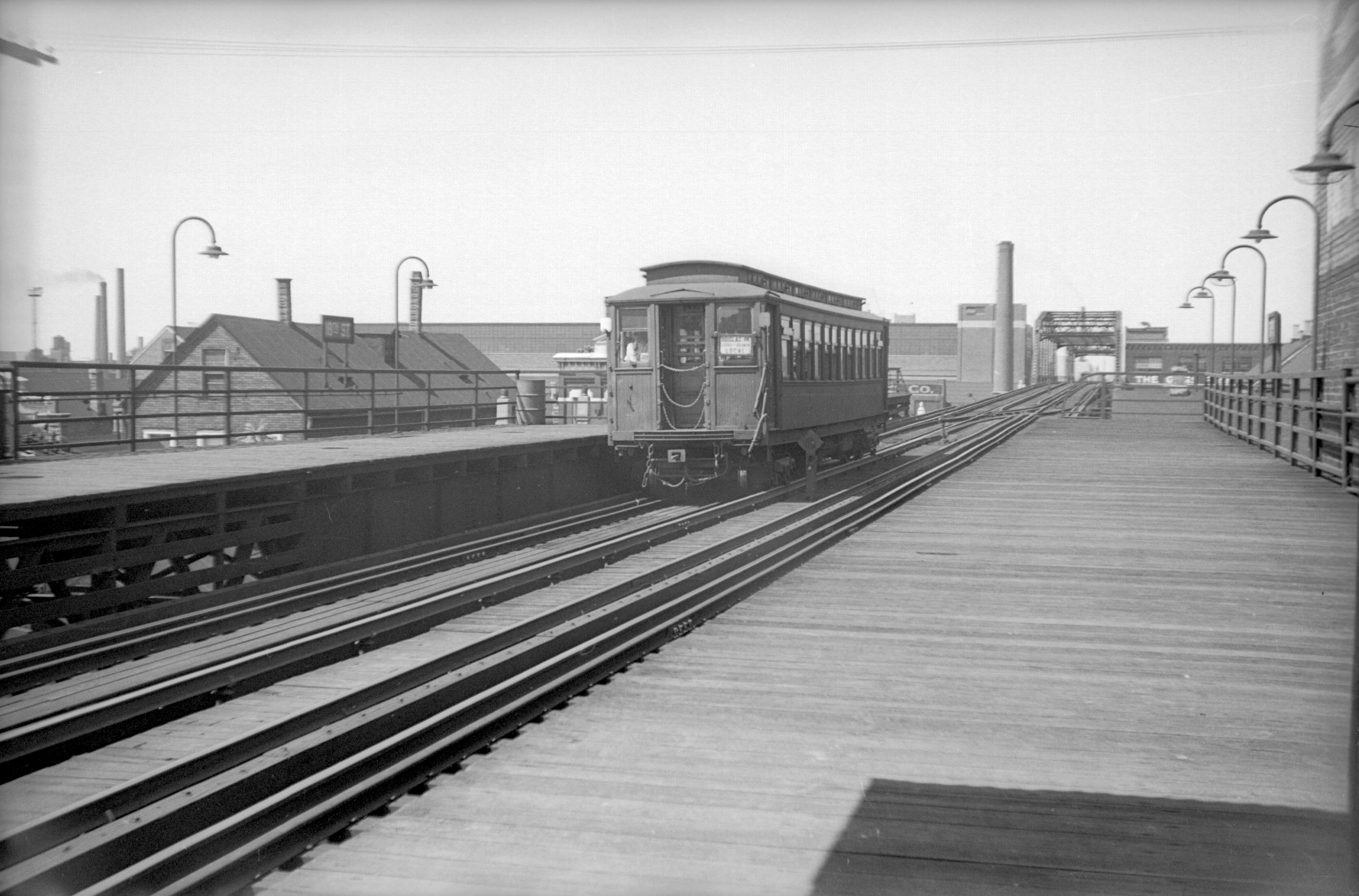
18th station in 1951

18th station opened on April 28, 1896, as part of the Metropolitan West Side Elevated Railroad's Douglas Park branch. From May 1991 until March 1993, the original station was demolished and rebuilt. On June 25, 2006, the 18th station, along with all other stations on the 54th/Cermak branch of the Blue Line, became part of the Pink Line. Rather than continuing east on the Blue Line through the Dearborn subway to O'Hare north of the Polk station, trains run north over a section of track on Paulina Avenue and then run on the same tracks as the Green Line west of the Ashland station before circling clockwise around the Loop and returning to 54th/Cermak via the same route.

In 2016, the Chicago Central Area Commission's proposed the construction of the Connector Transitway which would terminate at 18th.

In 2020, parts of the 1998 murals created by local artists were removed after they had been vandalised, after which the CTA has worked with the local community to restore the murals.

== Bus connections ==
CTA

- 18 16th/18th
