= Kedzie station (CTA Pink Line) =

Chicago rapid transit station, 1895–1954

Kedzie 3200W 2100S
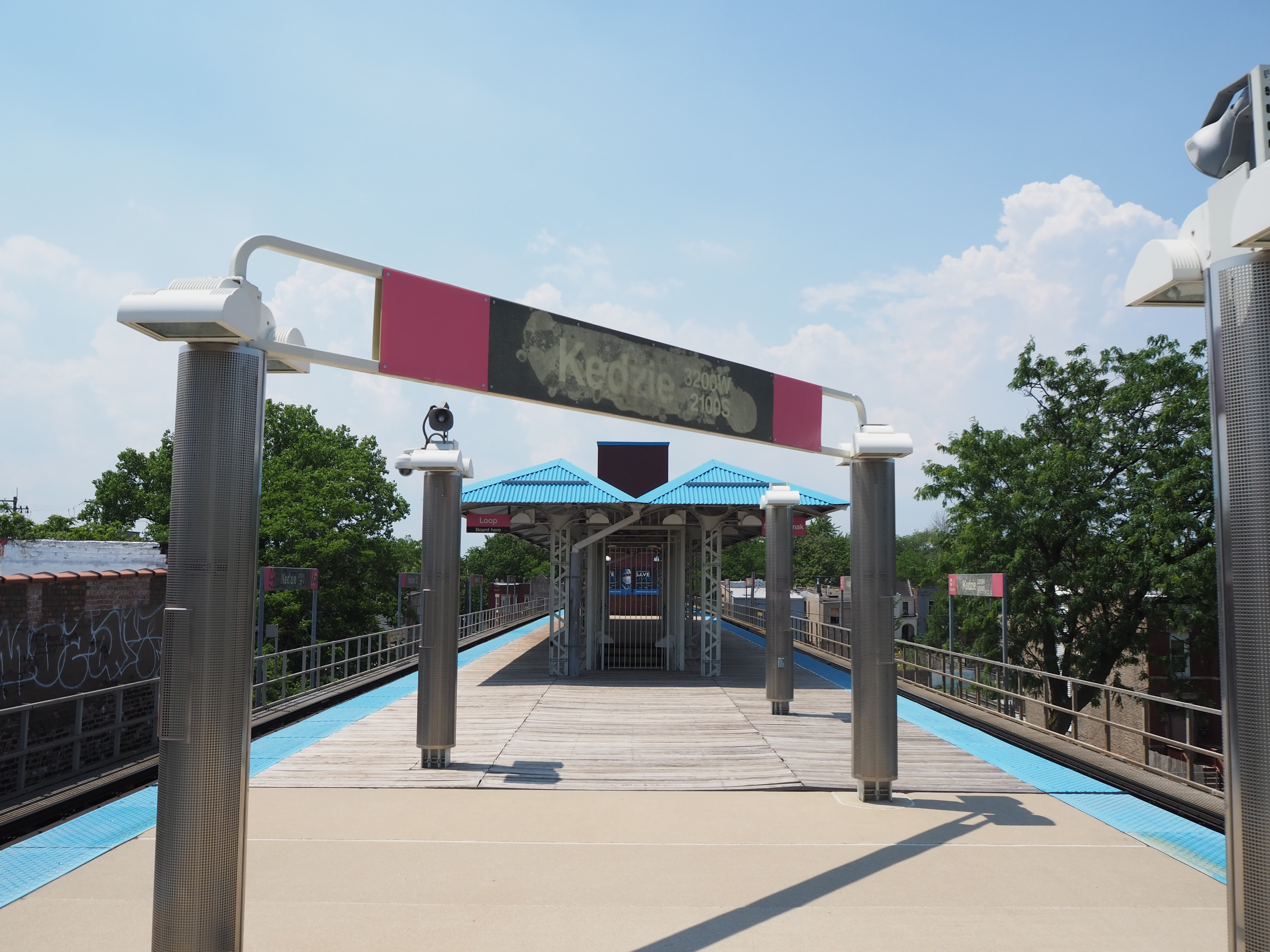

General information
- Location: 1944 South Kedzie Avenue; Chicago, Illinois 60623
- Coordinates: 41.853964°N 87.705408°W
- Owner: Chicago Transit Authority
- Line: Cermak branch
- Platforms: 1 island platform
- Tracks: 2
- Connections: CTA Buses

Construction
- Structure type: Elevated
- Cycle facilities: Yes
- Accessible: Yes

History
- Opened: March 10, 1902; 124 years ago
- Rebuilt: 2002–2004; 22 years ago

Passengers
- 2025: 264,779 ▼2%

Services
Preceding station	Chicago "L"	Following station
Central Park toward 54th/Cermak	Pink Line	California toward Loop (Clark/Lake)
Former services
Preceding station	Chicago "L"	Following station
Central Park toward 54th/Cermak	Blue Line Cermak branch	California toward O'Hare
Homan Closed 1951 toward Oak Park	Douglas branch	Douglas Park Closed 1952 toward Marshfield
Track layout
Location

Kedzie is a station on the Chicago Transit Authority's 'L' system, serving the Pink Line and the Lawndale neighborhood. It opened on March 10, 1902, as part of the Metropolitan West Side Elevated Railroad's Douglas Park branch. It was renovated between 2002 and 2004.

== Structure ==
The station consists of a single elevated island platform. The main accessible full-service entrance with ticket vending machines and an elevator is located on the west side of Kedzie Avenue, while there is a secondary non-accessible farecard-only entrance on the east side of Kedzie Avenue. The platform is mostly made of concrete, but unlike the other Pink Line stations, there is a short section where the platform crosses Kedzie Avenue that is made of wood and has an older non-renovated shelter.

== Bus connections ==
CTA

- 52 Kedzie
