= Laramie station =

Laramie station could refer to:

- Laramie station (CTA Green Line), Chicago "L" station in Austin, Chicago
- Laramie station (CTA Douglas branch), former Chicago "L" station
- Laramie station (CTA Garfield Park branch), former Chicago "L" station
- Laramie station (Wyoming), former Amtrak and Union Pacific passenger depot
