= California station (CTA Pink Line) =

Chicago rapid transit station

California 2100S 2800W
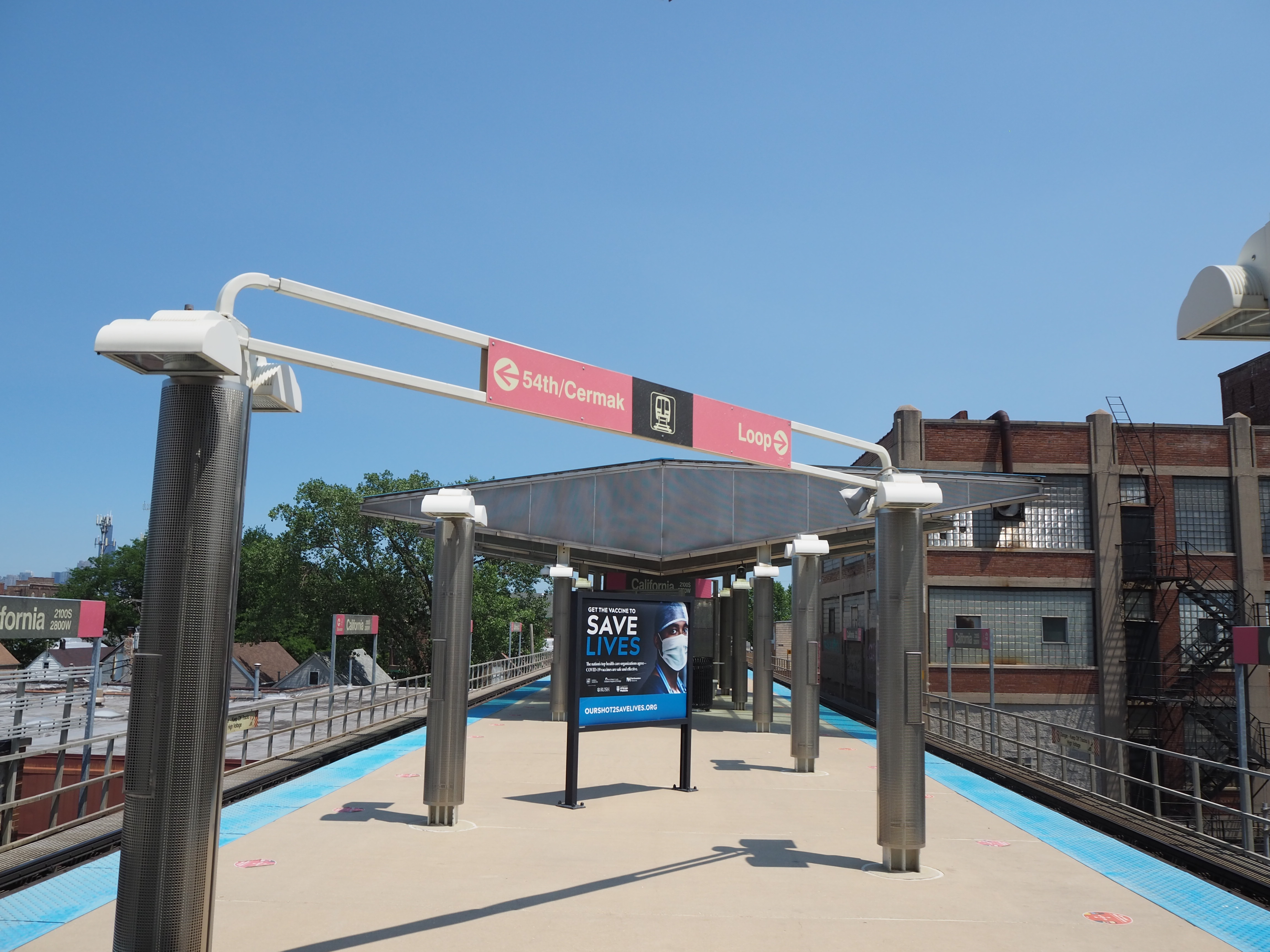

General information
- Location: 2011 South California Avenue; Chicago, Illinois 60608
- Coordinates: 41.854109°N 87.694774°W
- Owner: Chicago Transit Authority
- Line: Cermak Branch
- Platforms: 1 island platform
- Tracks: 2

Construction
- Structure type: Elevated
- Cycle facilities: Yes
- Accessible: Yes

History
- Opened: March 10, 1902; 124 years ago
- Rebuilt: 2002–2004; 22 years ago

Passengers
- 2025: 333,506 ▼2.6%

Services
Preceding station	Chicago "L"	Following station
Kedzie toward 54th/Cermak	Pink Line	Western toward Loop (Clark/Lake)
Former services
Preceding station	Chicago "L"	Following station
Kedzie toward 54th/Cermak	Blue Line Cermak branch	Western toward O'Hare
Douglas Park Closed 1952 toward Oak Park	Douglas branch	Western toward Marshfield
Track layout
Location

California is a station on the Chicago Transit Authority's 'L' system, serving the Pink Line and the Little Village neighborhood. The station opened on March 10, 1902, as part of the Metropolitan West Side Elevated Railroad's Douglas Park branch. It is the closest station to Cook County Jail.

== Structure ==
The station consists of a single elevated island platform with two entrances: a primary accessible full-service entrance with ticket vending machines on the east side of California Avenue, and a secondary farecard-only non-accessible entrance on the west side of California Avenue. Immediately to the west of the station, the tracks ramp up to cross over the BNSF Railway and associated Metra line.

== Bus connections ==
CTA

- 94 California
