= Western station (CTA Pink Line) =

Chicago rapid transit station

Western 2100S 2400W
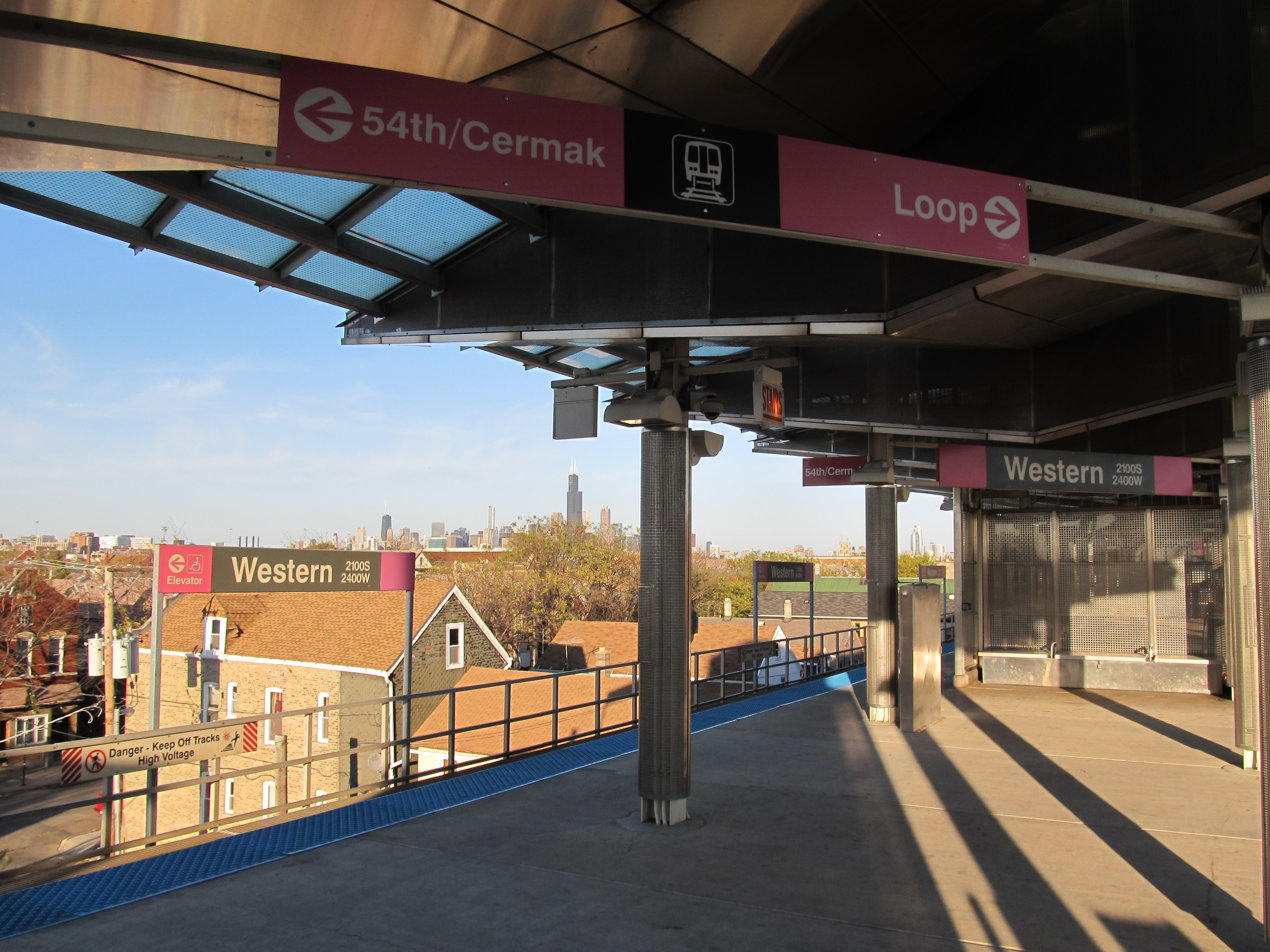

General information
- Location: 2009 South Western Avenue; Chicago, Illinois 60608
- Coordinates: 41.854225°N 87.685129°W
- Owner: Chicago Transit Authority
- Line: Cermak Branch
- Platforms: 1 island platform
- Tracks: 2
- Connections: at Western Avenue; CTA Buses

Construction
- Structure type: Elevated
- Accessible: Yes

History
- Opened: September 7, 1896; 130 years ago
- Rebuilt: 2002–2004; 22 years ago

Passengers
- 2025: 274,238 ▼2.5%

Services
| Preceding station | Chicago "L" | Following station |
|---|---|---|
| California toward 54th/Cermak | Pink Line | Damen toward Loop (Clark/Lake) |
Former services
| Preceding station | Chicago "L" | Following station |
|---|---|---|
| California toward 54th/Cermak | Blue Line Cermak branch | Damen toward O'Hare |
Track layout
Location

Western is a station on the Chicago Transit Authority's 'L' system, serving the Pink Line. It is located in the Heart of Chicago and Heart of Italy neighborhoods in the Lower West Side community area. The station was originally built in 1896 as part of the Metropolitan West Side Elevated Railroad's Douglas Park branch. It was rebuilt around 1935, and again between 2002 and 2004. It is located near Metra's Western Avenue & 18th Place station on the BNSF Line.

== Bus connections ==
CTA

- 49 Western (Owl Service)
- X49 Western Express (weekday rush hours only)
