= Damen station (CTA Pink Line) =

Chicago rapid transit station

Damen 2100S 2000W
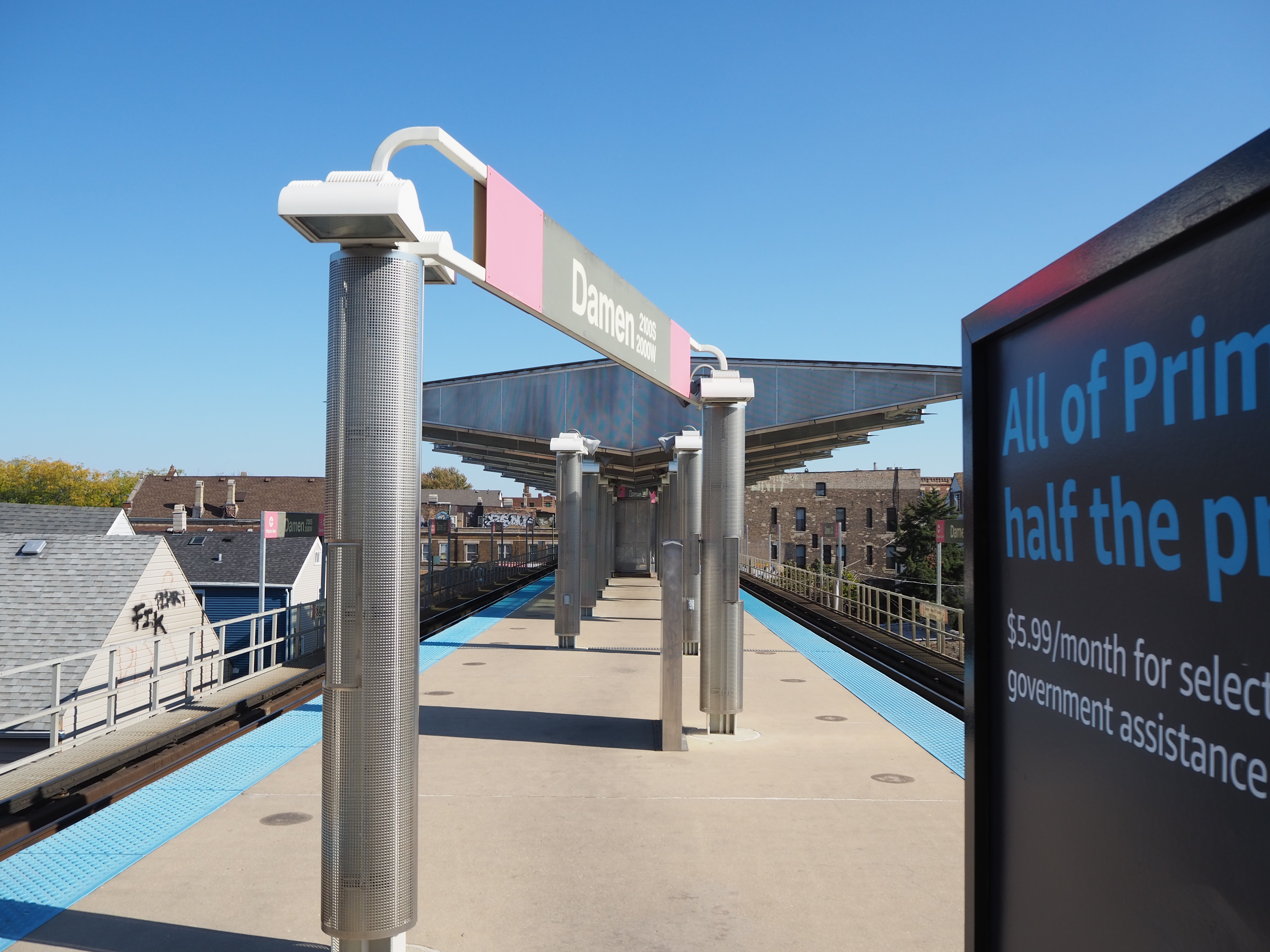

General information
- Location: 2010 South Damen Avenue; Chicago, Illinois 60608
- Coordinates: 41.854517°N 87.675975°W
- Owner: Chicago Transit Authority
- Line: Cermak Branch
- Platforms: 1 island platform
- Tracks: 2

Construction
- Structure type: Elevated
- Cycle facilities: Yes
- Accessible: Yes

History
- Opened: September 7, 1896; 130 years ago
- Rebuilt: 2002–2004; 22 years ago
- Former names: Hoyne

Passengers
- 2025: 380,074 ▲5.6%

Services
Preceding station	Chicago "L"	Following station
Western toward 54th/Cermak	Pink Line	18th toward Loop (Clark/Lake)
Former services
Preceding station	Chicago "L"	Following station
Western toward 54th/Cermak	Blue Line Cermak branch	18th toward O'Hare
Western toward Oak Park	Douglas branch	Wood Closed 1957 toward Marshfield
Track layout
Location

Damen is a station on the Chicago Transit Authority's 'L' system, serving the Pink Line and the Pilsen neighborhood.

== History ==
Damen station opened in 1896 as part of the Metropolitan West Side Elevated's Douglas Park branch. At the time the entrance was on Hoyne Avenue. Like the Kostner station to the west, during reconstruction of the Douglas branch in 2003, Damen Avenue (the block east of Hoyne) was made the site of the main entrance for better connection with the CTA route 50 Damen. At this time the name of the station was changed to "Damen" and Hoyne became an auxiliary entrance.

== Bus connections ==
CTA

- 50 Damen

Pace

- 755 Plainfield–IMD–West Loop Express (weekday rush hours only)
