= Cermak branch =

Segment of the Chicago "L"

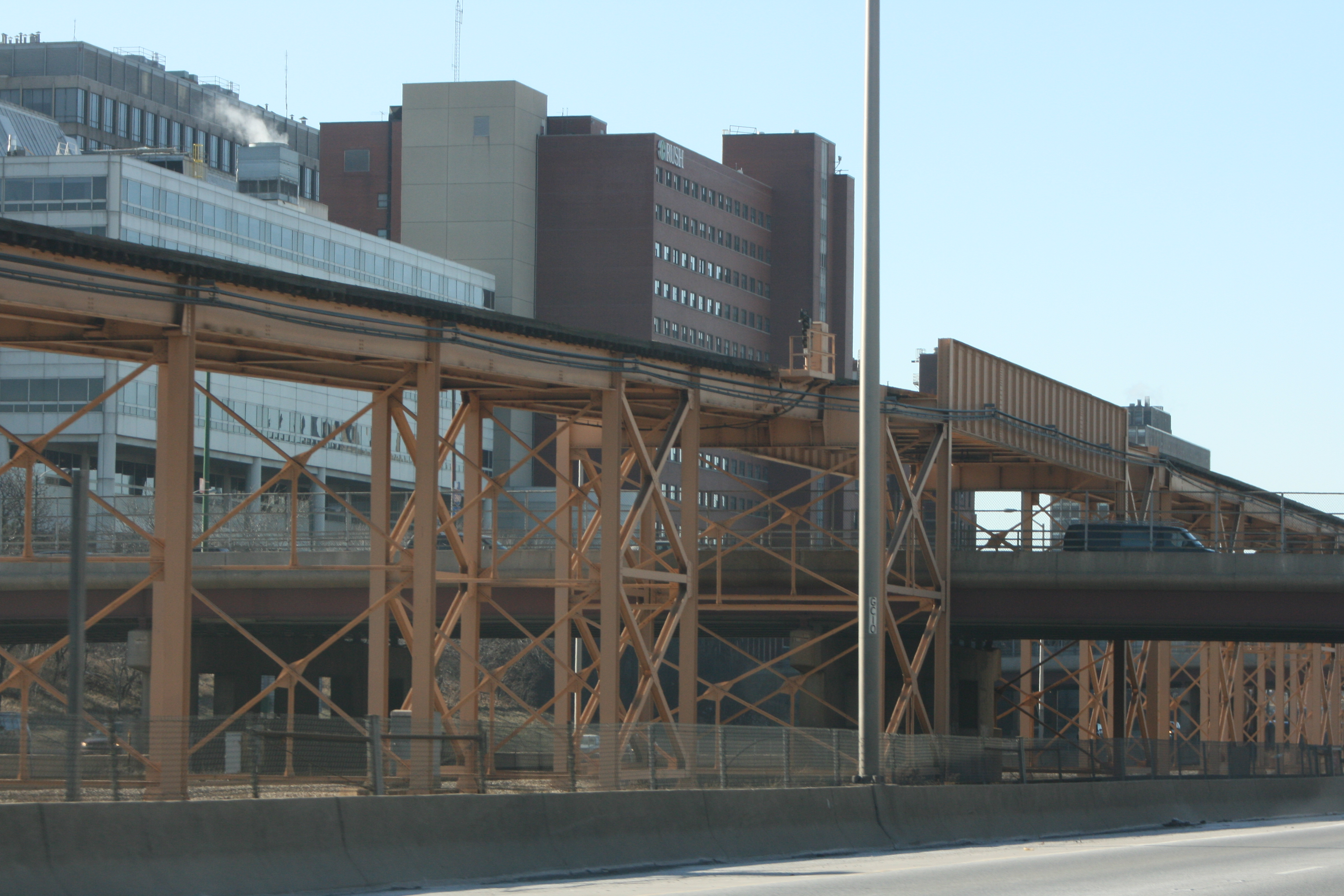
- The non-revenue Loomis Junction between the Cermak and Congress branch that used to serve Blue Line trains.

Overview
- Status: Operational
- Locale: Chicago, Illinois, United States; Cicero, Illinois
- Termini: 54th/Cermak; Polk
- Stations: 11

Service
- Type: Rapid transit
- System: Chicago "L"
- Services: Pink
- Operator(s): Chicago Transit Authority(1947–present); Chicago Rapid Transit Company (1924–1947); Metropolitan West Side Elevated Railroad (1896–1924)
- Rolling stock: 5000-series
- Daily ridership: 17,474 (average weekday February 2013)

History
- Opened: April 28, 1896; 130 years ago

Technical
- Line length: 6.6 mi (10.6 km)
- Character: Elevated, At-grade level
- Track gauge: 4 ft 8 1/2 in (1,435 mm) standard gauge
- Electrification: Third rail, 600 V DC

The Cermak branch, formerly known (and still internally referred to) as the Douglas branch, is a 6.6 mi (10.6 km) long section of the Pink Line of the Chicago "L" system in Chicago, Illinois. It was built by the Metropolitan West Side Elevated west of the Loop. As of February 2013, it serves an average of 17,474 passengers every weekday. The branch serves the Near West Side, Pilsen, Lower West Side, South Lawndale, and North Lawndale neighborhoods of Chicago, and the west suburb Cicero, Illinois. The branch operates from 4:05 a.m. to 1:25 a.m., weekdays, and Saturdays from 5:05 a.m. to 1:25 a.m., and Sundays from 5:00 a.m. to 1:25 a.m., including holidays.

== History ==
Initially known as the Douglas Park branch, construction began in June 1893 and the line was inaugurated on April 28, 1896, between Marshfield Avenue and 18th Street. The branch started off with four stations and was the shortest of the Metropolitan West Side Elevated. Construction time was longer than in other sections. On August 7, 1896, the Douglas Park branch was extended to Western.

On June 29, 1900, the City of Chicago approved an extension of the branch to Pulaski (then 40th Avenue) and construction took place in mid-June 1901. On March 10, 1902, the Douglas Park branch was extended to Lawndale Avenue, which allowed the opening of four new stations: California, Kedzie, Homan, and Clifton Park (Drake).

On May 22, 1907, the Douglas Park branch was extended to 46th Avenue (Kenton Avenue), which is the Chicago city limits. The station was a few meters from the Hawthorne plant of the Western Electric which was one of the largest employers in the area of Chicago at the time. On December 16, 1907, the Douglas Park branch was extended to Cicero (then 48th Avenue), extending service to the town of Cicero, Illinois.

Grand opening celebration on the Douglas Park branch extension to Oak Park Avenue, 1924

On August 20, 1910, the Douglas Park branch was extended to Laramie (then 52nd Avenue). On August 1, 1912, service was extended to 56th Avenue (Central Avenue) and extended again to Lombard Avenue exactly three years later. The final stretch on the branch was to Oak Park Avenue, in Berwyn, which opened on March 16, 1924.

On December 9, 1951, during the establishment of skip/stop A/B, the Chicago Transit Authority, which had taken over operation of the "L" system in 1947, streamlined service on the line and shut down five stations: 14th Place, Homan, Drake, Lawndale and Kenton, while opening a station at Central Park. On February 3, 1952, service on the Douglas line was suspended to all stations west of 54th/Cermak. Service to these areas was replaced by a bus route.

The stations at Roosevelt and Douglas Park were closed three months later. On June 22, 1958, Douglas trains were rerouted to the West-Northwest route, the Congress branch, the new line in the middle of the Eisenhower Expressway and connecting routes to the Milwaukee–Dearborn subway, heading north to Logan Square. The new system changed the service and it was decided that all stations on the Douglas branch would now be "B" and the Congress branch would now be "A". In 1973, due to budget cuts, the 50th Avenue station closed.

=== Renovations ===
In 1983, Polk and Cicero were rebuilt to make them ADA accessible for passengers with disabilities. The poorly utilized Laramie station was closed to accelerate service the following year. In 1993, 18th was rebuilt to provide access for passengers with disabilities and the CTA color-coded the lines, placing the Douglas branch as part of the Blue Line. In 1995, the A/B service was abandoned and all trains stop at every station, which does not affect the service of the stations on the Douglas branch. In 1996, the CTA changed the name of the branch to the Cermak branch, although Chicagoans still use the name "Douglas" to refer to the line. In 1998, the branch lost its 24/7 service, along with the Purple and Green Lines. On September 10, 2001, the CTA began a $363 million renovation project of the branch. From 2002 to 2003, Laramie was temporarily reopened during the rebuilding of the new 54th/Cermak terminal. The entire project was completed on January 8, 2005. As of today, all eleven stations on the branch are ADA accessible.

=== Current ===
The current Pink Line route was assigned to the Douglas branch on June 25, 2006. The new route connected the Douglas Branch to the Loop via the Paulina Connector and the Lake Street Elevated. Blue Line service on the Douglas branch was reduced to running only during rush hour. The CTA ended Blue Line service on the Douglas branch on April 25, 2008.

== Station listing ==
Station	Location	Notes
Oak Park	Oak Park Avenue and 22nd Street	Closed February 3, 1952; demolished
Ridgeland	Ridgeland Avenue and 21st Street	Closed February 3, 1952; demolished
Lombard	Lombard Avenue and 21st Street	Closed February 3, 1952; demolished
Austin	Austin Boulevard and 21st Street	Closed February 3, 1952; demolished
58th Avenue	58th Avenue and 21st Street	Closed February 3, 1952; demolished
Central	Central Avenue and Cermak Road	Closed February 3, 1952; demolished Originally known as 56th Avenue
54th/Cermak	2151 South 54th Avenue, Cicero, Illinois	Auxiliary entrance at Laramie Avenue
Laramie	2130 South Laramie Avenue, Cicero, Illinois	Closed February 9, 1992; reopened in December 2001 during Douglas branch renovation and closed on August 16, 2003 Originally known as 52nd Avenue
50th Avenue	2133 South 50th Avenue, Cicero, Illinois	Closed 1978; deconstructed, reassembled, and preserved in Illinois Railway Museum
Cicero	2134 South Cicero Avenue, Cicero, Illinois	Originally known as 48th Avenue
Kenton	Cermak Road west of Kilbourn Avenue	Closed December 9, 1951; demolished
Kostner	2019 South Kostner Avenue	Originally known as Kildare (one block east of Kostner) until 2002; became Kostner July 17, 2003 and Kildare was converted into an auxiliary entrance
Pulaski	2021 South Pulaski Road	Originally known as 40th Avenue Terminal and later Crawford Avenue.
Lawndale	Lawndale Avenue and 21st Street	Closed December 9, 1951; demolished
Central Park	1944 South Central Park Avenue	South Lawndale, Little Village
Drake	Drake Avenue and 21st Street	Closed December 9, 1951; demolished
Homan	Homan Avenue and 21st Street	Closed December 9, 1951; demolished
Kedzie	1944 South Kedzie Avenue	
Douglas Park	2008 South Marshall Boulevard	Closed May 3, 1952; demolished
California	2010 South California Avenue	
Western	2010 South Western Avenue	
Damen	2010 South Damen Avenue	Originally known as Hoyne (one block west of Damen) until 2002; became Damen on July 22, 2004 and Hoyne was converted into an auxiliary entrance
Wood	Wood Street and 21st Street	Closed May 19, 1957; demolished
18th	1710 West 18th Street	
14th Place	14th Place and Paulina Street	Closed December 9, 1951; demolished
Roosevelt	Roosevelt Road and Paulina Street	Closed May 3, 1952; demolished Originally known as 12th Street
Polk	1713 West Polk Street	

== Image gallery ==
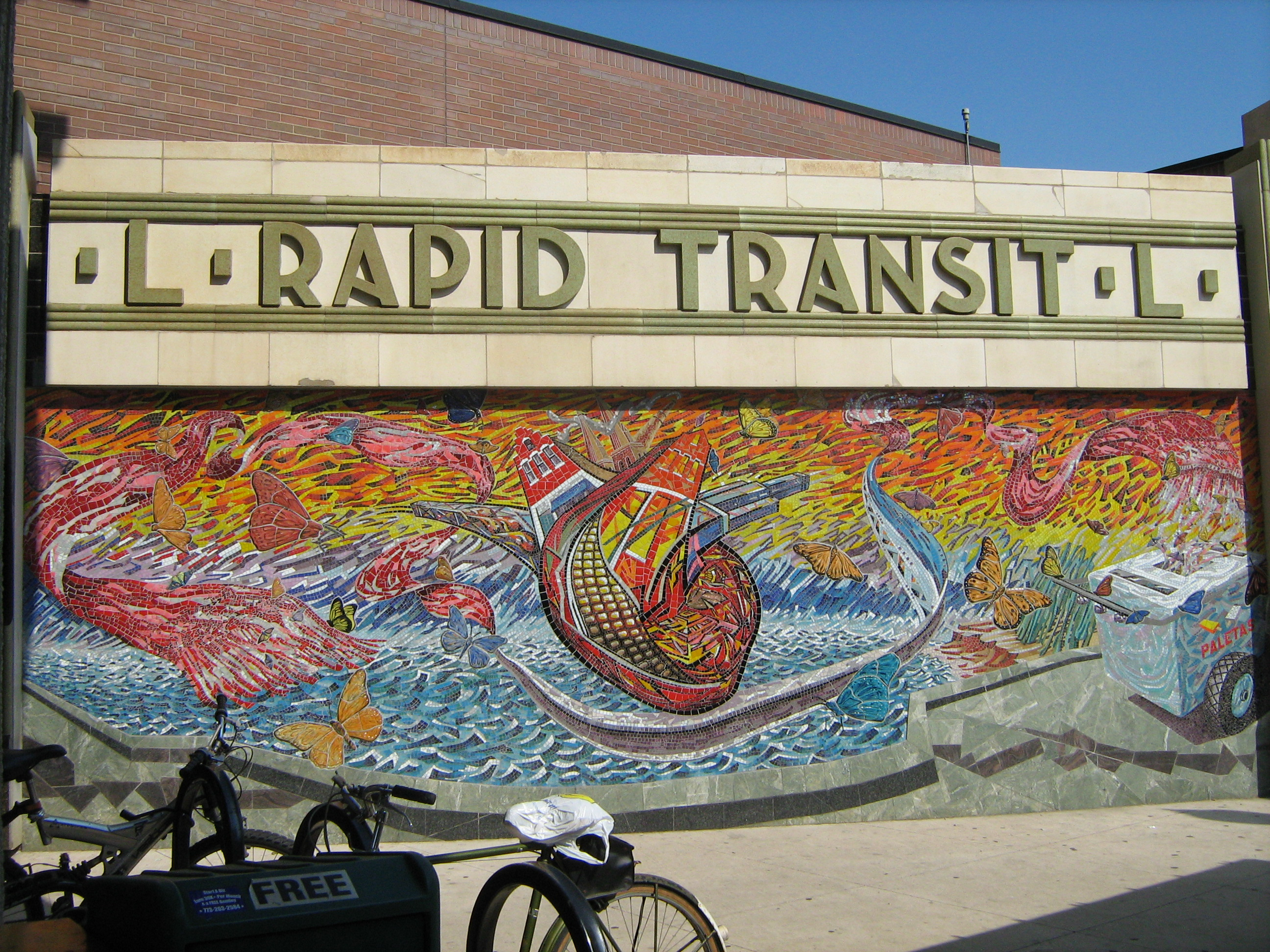
An art wall sitting just outside the entrance at Western

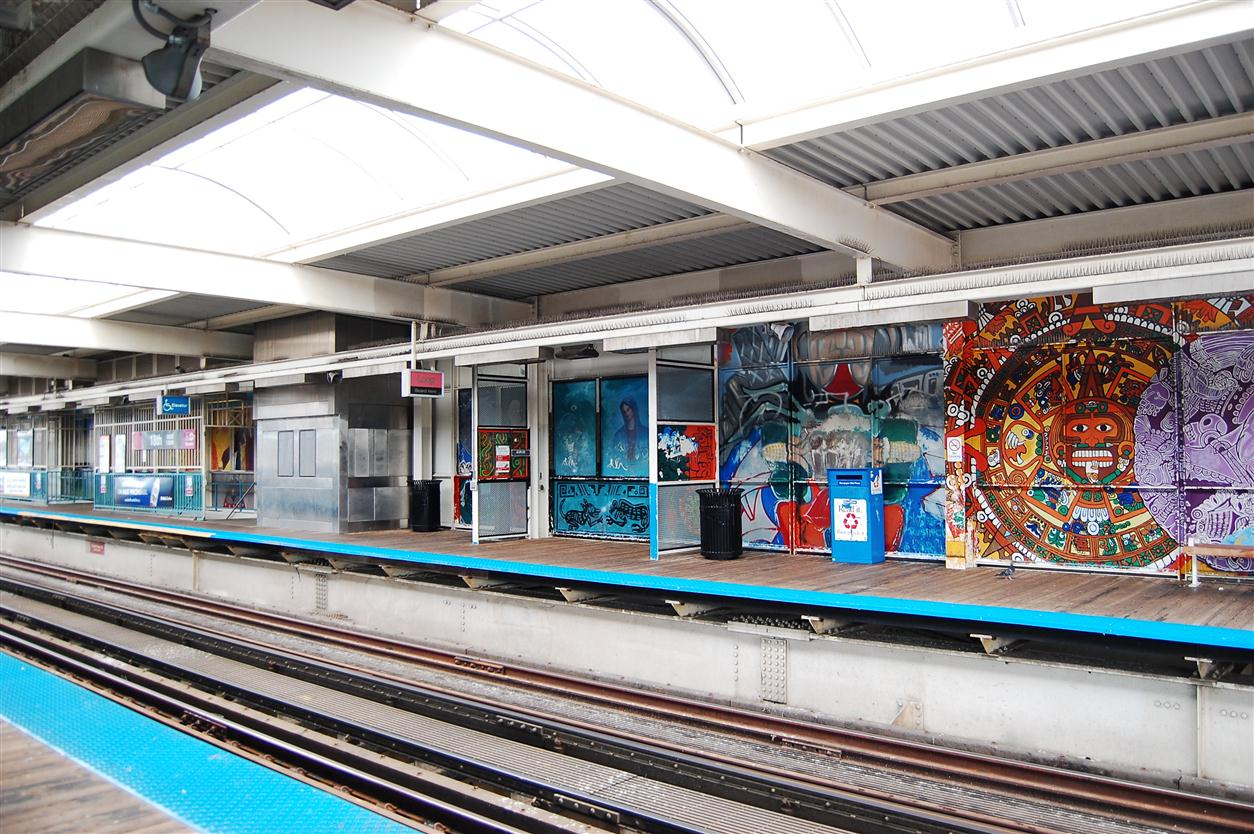
The 18th station is built with art walls and structures

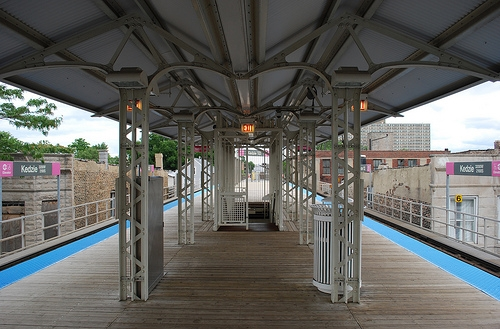
The Kedzie station has a wide-wooden platform with passenger shelters

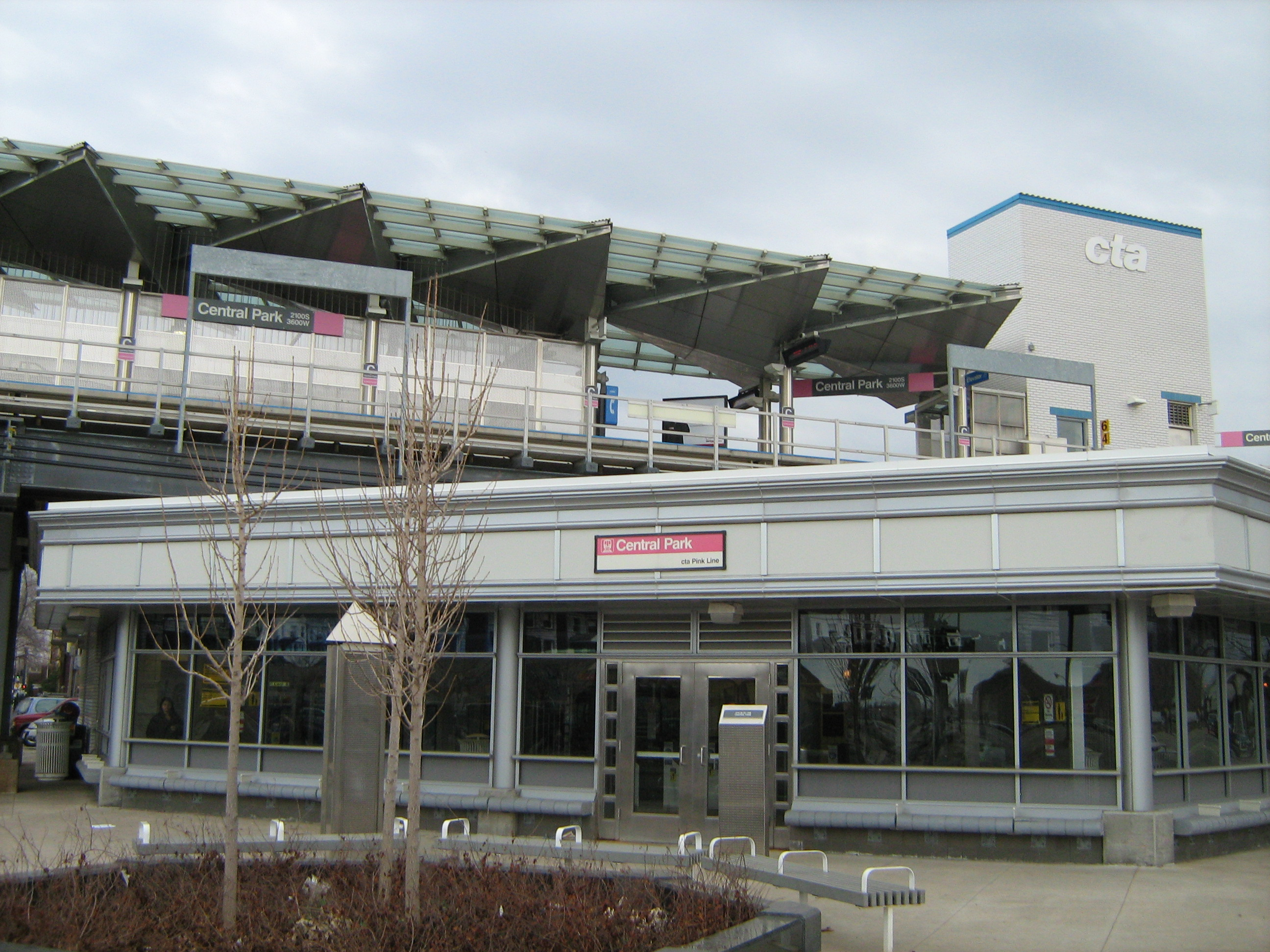
The side entrance and small plaza at Central Park.
