= Powder burn =

Burn caused by exposure to gases from firing gun

A powder burn is a type of burn caused by exposure to the combustion gases which are expelled from the muzzle of a firearm as it is fired. Powder burns only occur when the individual is close to the discharging firearm, as the gases quickly dissipate. This can be an indicator on a corpse of whether the person was shot at point-blank range or not.
