= Pink Line (CTA) =

Chicago "L" rapid transit line

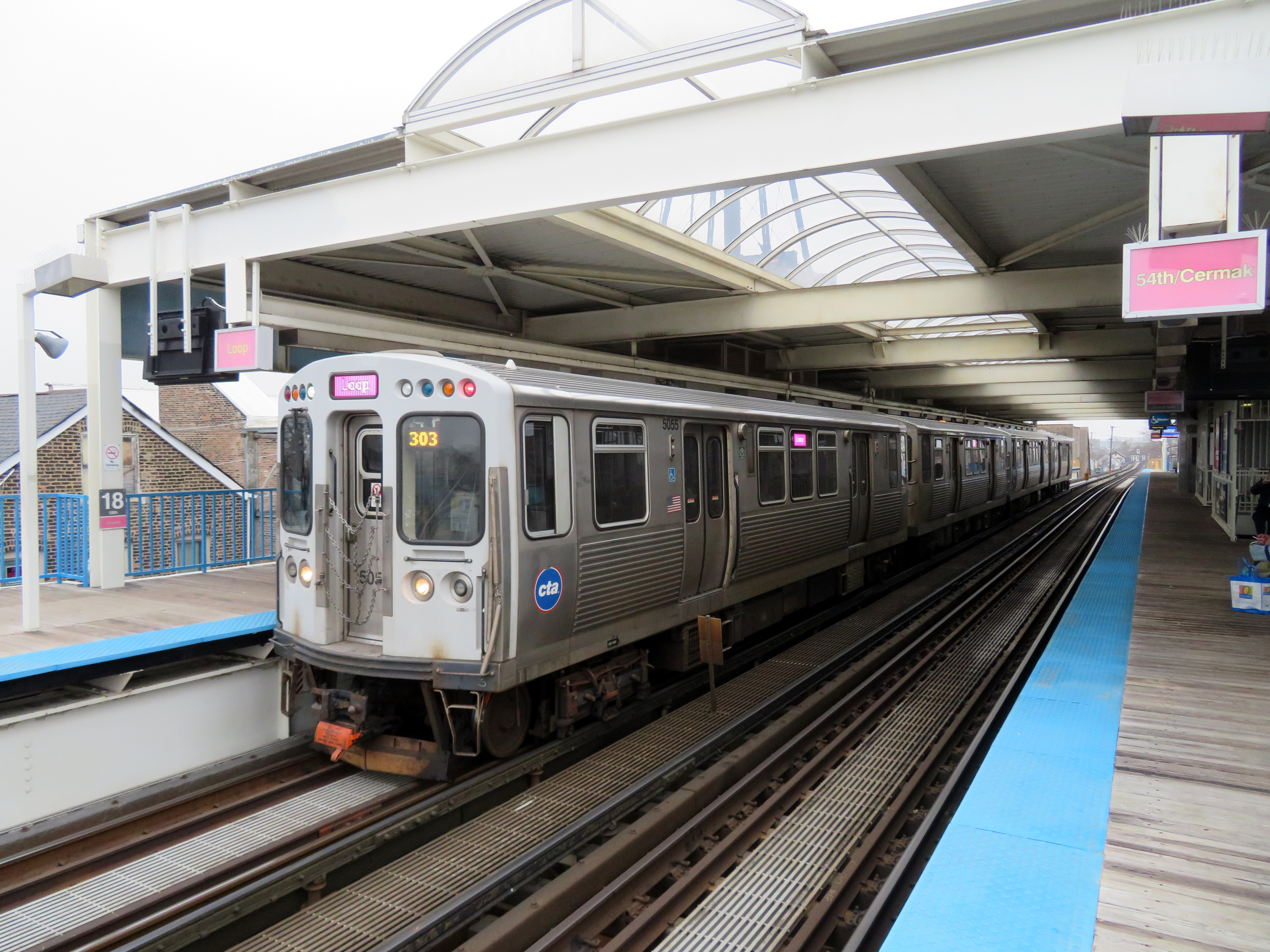
- A Pink Line train of 5000-series cars at 18th

Overview
- Status: Operational
- Locale: Chicago and Cicero, Illinois, United States
- Termini: 54th/Cermak; The Loop
- Stations: 22

Service
- Type: Rapid transit
- System: Chicago "L"
- Operator: Chicago Transit Authority
- Depot: 54th Yard
- Rolling stock: 5000-series 4-car trains (typical); maximum 8 cars
- Daily ridership: 11,761 (avg. weekday 2024)

History
- Opened: June 25, 2006; 20 years ago

Technical
- Line length: 11.2 mi (18.0 km)
- Character: Elevated and at-grade
- Track gauge: 4 ft 8 1/2 in (1,435 mm) standard gauge
- Minimum radius: 90 feet (27 m)
- Electrification: Third rail, 600 V DC
Route map
Pink Line highlighted in pink
Key

The Pink Line is an 11.2 mi (18.0 km) rapid transit line in Chicago, run by the Chicago Transit Authority (CTA) as part of the Chicago "L" system. It is the CTA's newest rail line and began operation for a 180-day trial period on June 25, 2006, running between 54th/Cermak station in Cicero, Illinois and the Loop in downtown Chicago. As the line enters downtown Chicago, it begins to share tracks with Green Line trains on Lake Street. This connection is handled by the previously non-revenue Paulina Connector set of tracks. In 2023, over 3 million passengers boarded Pink Line trains.

As of April 2026, outside the Loop, the Pink Line is one of three branches of the Chicago "L" system without any slow zones.

== Operation ==
The Pink Line, which was once the Blue Line's Cermak branch, begins at 54th Avenue and Cermak Road in Cicero (5400 W. – 2200 S.). The line runs on at-grade tracks parallel to Cermak Road from the terminal to about a quarter-mile (400 m) east of Cicero Avenue, then runs diagonally northeast until it reaches a corridor parallel and adjacent to 21st Street at Kostner Avenue. It then continues east between 21st Street and Cullerton Street, climbing up from at-grade tracks to elevated tracks, through the North Lawndale, Little Village and Pilsen neighborhoods of Chicago, with stops at Kostner, Pulaski, Central Park, Kedzie, California, Western and Damen.

The line turns north near Paulina Street stopping at 18th and Polk stations, then crosses over the Eisenhower Expressway (Interstate 290). Just south of that crossing, at a control point known as Harrison Junction, a two track non-revenue branch diverges that descends to the expressway median to provide a non-revenue connection with the Blue Line. It then continues north on the Paulina Connector to Paulina Junction where it meets and subsequently shares tracks with the Green Line above Lake Street - with common stops at Ashland, Morgan and Clinton - before entering and operating around the Loop clockwise.

== History ==
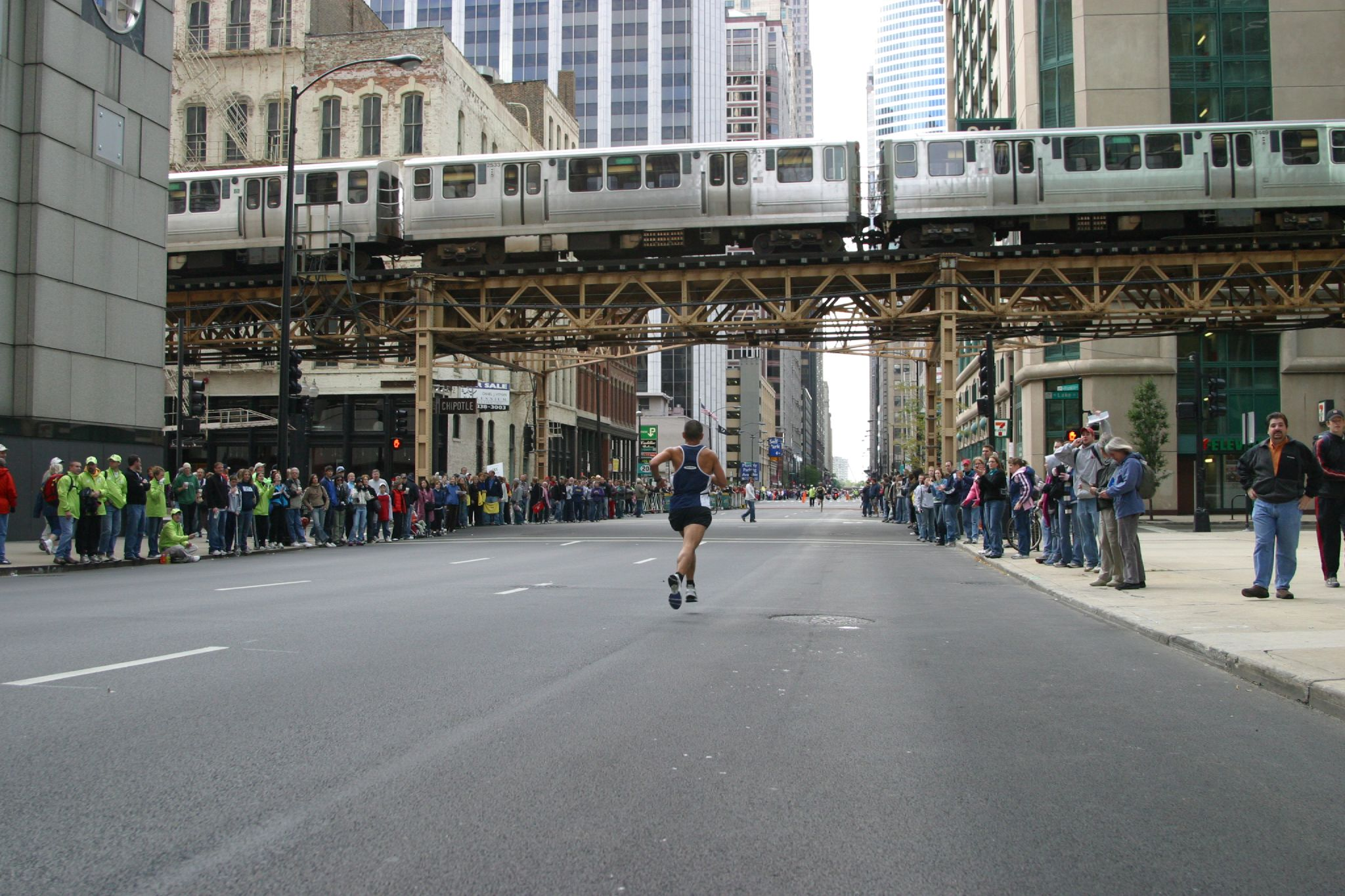
Pink and Green line elevated tracks crossing Franklin Street in the Loop

=== As the Blue Line Douglas/Cermak branch ===
Until 1996, the Cermak branch was known as the Douglas branch, for Douglas Park along its route. Originally, Douglas trains were operated by the Metropolitan West Side Elevated directly into the Loop by means of the Metropolitan's main line. Construction of the Congress Street Superhighway (known now as the Eisenhower Expressway, I-290) in the 1950s required the removal of the Metropolitan's main line, resulting in Douglas trains being routed to the Loop via the Paulina Connector and the Lake Street 'L' similar to the current service.

Upon completion of the new Congress branch in the median of the expressway, all trains of the Douglas branch were operated via the Milwaukee-Dearborn Subway to the city's Northwest Side and to O'Hare. The Douglas branch was re-named the Cermak branch in the mid-1990s. The entire Cermak branch is ADA accessible.

=== Converting to the Pink Line ===
In January 2006, the CTA held hearings on its proposal to reroute trains from 54th/Cermak via the recently rebuilt Paulina Connector to the Lake Street Green Line tracks, then operating around the Loop clockwise for the first time since Douglas trains began using the Milwaukee-Dearborn Subway in downtown Chicago on June 22, 1958. This would allow a doubling of Blue Line trains to Forest Park on the Congress Branch, since service would no longer be divided between the Forest Park and 54th/Cermak terminals. The CTA has also promised that service to/from 54th/Cermak would be increased 100% during weekday rush hours.

At the initial time of proposal, this plan was often referred to as the "Silver Line", as the original idea was to use gray as the line color on printed materials and give it the route name of "Silver".

In February 2006, the CTA approved the separate plan. Non-rush hour trains would be routed via the Loop, Green Line tracks and Paulina Connector. During weekday rush hours, service would be available on this routing as well as the original route via the Dearborn Street subway every half hour. These changes went into effect beginning June 25, 2006, with the trial period scheduled to end 180 days later on December 22, 2006.

In March 2006, the Chicago Transit Authority announced that of the top three colors, Pink, Gold and Silver, Pink had received the most votes in a write-in essay contest for Chicago-area schoolchildren in kindergarten through 8th grade—a $1,000 savings bond was awarded to a selected essay writer who advocated for the color pink.

The Pink Line began operation in June 2006, using the rebuilt Paulina Connector, which had not been used in regular revenue service for 48 years.

The service, which was originally set up as a temporary service to be run for a trial period of 180 days (6 months), doubled service on both the Douglas branch and the Forest Park branch of the Blue Line. This was accomplished by routing all but 12 trains per day coming from O'Hare to Forest Park and adding entirely new service from the 54th/Cermak terminal in Cicero to The Loop via the Paulina Connector and the Lake Street branch of the Green Line. Pink Line trains operate clockwise on the Inner Loop track via Lake-Wabash-Van Buren-Wells before returning to 54th/Cermak.

On December 12, 2006, the CTA board approved a six-month extension to the trial period before making a decision on whether or not to make the changes permanent, and another 180-day extension was added to the trial in June 2007. On December 4, 2008, CTA announced its decision to make the Pink Line permanent.

== Operating hours and headways ==
The Pink Line operates between 54th/Cermak and the Loop weekdays from 4 a.m. to 2 a.m., and weekends from 5 a.m. to 2 a.m. Trains run on a minimum headway of 20 minutes after midnight, decreasing to 8–9 minutes during weekday rush hours.

== Rolling stock ==
The Pink Line is operated with the Bombardier-built 5000-series railcars. Trains operate using four cars on weekdays and weekends. Frequently, the Pink and Green Lines borrow each other's cars when either line is short on cars. Since September 2018, two cars sets assigned to the Pink Line make weekday rush hour trips on the Blue Line. At the time of their reintroduction, all Pink Line consists using 5000-series cars were six cars long. As of mid-August 2012, the Pink Line was using the 5000-series cars in four and six car consists.

With the successful testing of the Pink Line 5000-series cars in four car consists during August, the Pink Line reverted to running four cars during most times of the day. Some of the 5000-series cars that had been assigned to the line, were reassigned to the Green Line. The last 2600-series cars were removed from service from the Pink Line in June 2012, making the Pink Line the first line to be fully equipped with the 5000-series cars. Most of the Pink Line's 2600-series cars were reassigned to the Blue Line to replace its 2200-series cars.

== Possible route to Kimball ==
In 2002, the CTA proposed the creation of the "Circle Line", which would utilize segments of existing rail lines to keep new construction to a minimum, in addition to 6.6 miles (10.6 km) of new subway and elevated segments to the 'L' system to complete the circumferential route. Maps additionally suggested increasing the route length of two lines: Possibly running the Brown Line from its terminus at Kimball, to the Loop, and continuing to the 54th/Cermak terminus via the current Pink Line route from the Loop; and Orange Line service from Kimball, to the Loop, and continuing to Midway Airport via the current Orange Line route. These considerations have been undergoing study and analysis.

== Station listing ==
Location	Station	Connections
Cicero	54th/Cermak	CTA buses: 21 54B N60; Pace buses: 316, 322
Cicero	Cicero	CTA buses: 21 54 54B N60; Pace buses: 302, 392
North Lawndale	Kostner	
North Lawndale	Pulaski	CTA buses: 53 157
North Lawndale	Central Park	CTA buses: 82 157
North Lawndale	Kedzie	CTA buses: 52
South Lawndale	California	CTA buses: 94
Lower West Side	Western	Metra: BNSF (at Western Avenue); CTA buses: 49 X49
Lower West Side	Damen	CTA buses: 50; Pace buses: 755
Lower West Side	18th	CTA buses: 18
Near West Side	Polk	CTA buses: 7 157; Pace buses: 755
Near West Side	Ashland	Chicago "L": Green; CTA buses: 9 X9
Near West Side	Morgan	
Near West Side	Clinton	Chicago "L": Green; Metra: Union Pacific North, Union Pacific Northwest, Union Pacific West (at Ogilvie Transportation Center); CTA buses: J14 56 125
The Loop	Clark/Lake (inner platform)	Chicago "L": Blue Brown Green Purple Orange; CTA buses: 22 24 134 135 136 156
The Loop	~~State/Lake~~	Temporarily closed for reconstruction until mid-2029
The Loop	Randolph/Wabash	Closed September 3, 2017; demolished and replaced by Washington/Wabash
The Loop	Washington/Wabash (inner platform)	Chicago "L": Red (at Lake) (Note: Temporarily, during the closure of State/Lake.); Metra: Metra Electric (at Millennium Station); NICTD: Lakeshore Corridor, Monon Corridor (at Millennium Station); CTA buses: N4 J14 20 56 60 N66 124 147 157
The Loop	Madison/Wabash	Closed March 16, 2015; demolished and replaced by Washington/Wabash
The Loop	Adams/Wabash (inner platform)	Chicago "L": Green Orange Brown Pink; CTA buses: 1 7 28 126 151
The Loop	Harold Washington Library (inner platform)	Chicago "L": Orange Brown Pink Red (at Jackson), Blue (at Jackson); CTA buses: 2 6 10 22 24 29 36 62 130 146 147 148
The Loop	LaSalle/Van Buren (inner platform)	Metra: Rock Island (at LaSalle Street); CTA buses: 22 24 36 130
The Loop	Quincy (inner platform)	Metra: BNSF, Heritage Corridor, Milwaukee District North, Milwaukee District West, North Central Service, SouthWest Service (at Union Station); Amtrak long-distance: California Zephyr, Cardinal, City of New Orleans, Empire Builder, Floridian, Lake Shore Limited, Southwest Chief, Texas Eagle (at Union Station); Amtrak intercity: Blue Water, Borealis, Hiawatha, Illini and Saluki, Illinois Zephyr and Carl Sandburg, Lincoln Service, Pere Marquette, Wolverine (at Union Station); CTA buses: 1 7 28 37 126 130 134 135 136 151 156
The Loop	Washington/Wells (inner platform)	Chicago "L": Brown Orange Purple; Metra: Union Pacific North, Union Pacific Northwest, Union Pacific West (at Ogilvie Transportation Center); CTA buses: J14 20 37 56 60 124 157

After stopping at Washington/Wells, Pink Line trains return to Clinton, then make all stops back to 54th/Cermak.

== Rail yard ==
The 54th Yard is a CTA rail yard for the Pink Line in Cicero, Illinois. Currently, 5000-series railcars are stored here.

== See also ==
- Cermak branch
