= 54th/Cermak station =

Chicago "L" Station

54th/Cermak 2200S 5400W
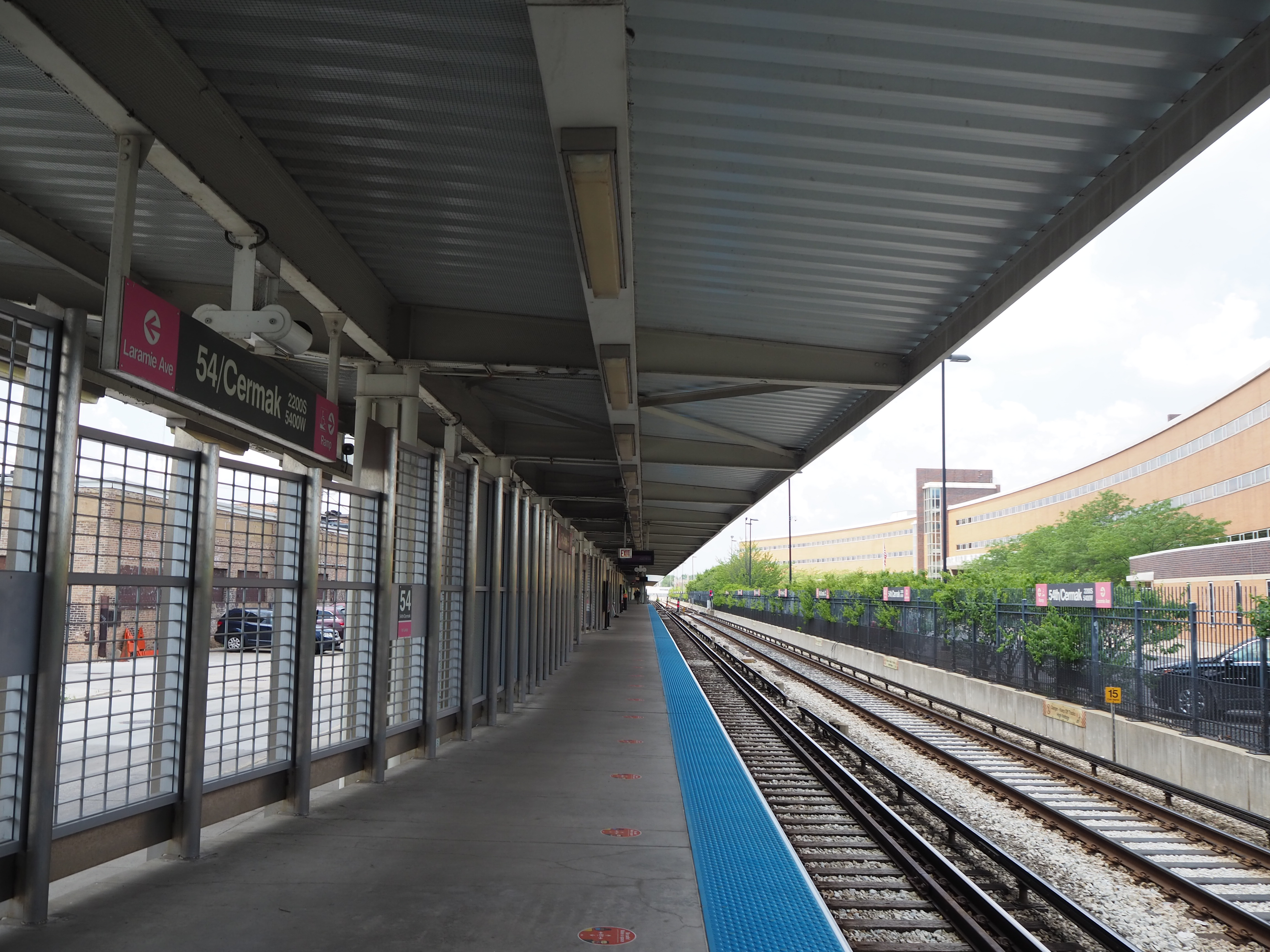
- The eastern boarding portion of the platform

General information
- Location: 2151 South 54th Avenue; Cicero, Illinois 60804
- Coordinates: 41.851663°N 87.759598°W
- Owner: Chicago Transit Authority
- Line: Cermak Branch
- Platforms: 1 side platform
- Tracks: 2
- Connections: CTA Buses; Pace Buses

Construction
- Structure type: At-grade
- Parking: 175 spaces
- Cycle facilities: Yes
- Accessible: Yes

History
- Opened: August 1, 1912; 114 years ago
- Rebuilt: 1952; 74 years ago, 2002–2003; 23 years ago
- Former names: 54th Avenue; Cicero-Berwyn

Passengers
- 2025: 502,100 ▼1.6%

Services
Preceding station	Chicago "L"	Following station
Terminus	Pink Line	Cicero toward Loop (Clark/Lake)
Former services
Preceding station	Chicago "L"	Following station
Terminus	Blue Line Cermak branch	Cicero toward O'Hare
Central Closed 1952 toward Oak Park	Douglas branch	Laramie Closed 1992 toward Marshfield
Track layout
Location

54th/Cermak is an 'L' station and the terminus of the CTA's Pink Line. It was the terminus of the former Cermak branch of the Blue Line. It is located at Cermak Road between 54th and Laramie Avenues in Cicero, Illinois. It is the only terminal with only one track used for service. Trains board on the eastern half of 54th/Cermak station and unload on the western half. Previously known as the Cicero-Berwyn Terminal, it is located about 1 mile (1.6 km) from the city of Berwyn. Tracks continue westward to the 54th Yard, the maintenance and storage yard for Pink Line trains.

== Bus connections ==
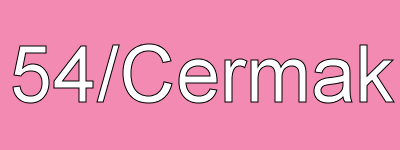
54th/Cermak destination sign

CTA

- 21 Cermak
- N60 Blue Island/26th (Owl Service – overnight only)

Pace

- 302 Ogden-Stanley (Monday–Saturday only)
- 316 Laramie Avenue (Monday–Saturday only)
- 322 Cermak Road-22nd Street

== Notes ==
Platforms and tracks

- East platform side: It is served by CTA's Pink Line to the Loop in downtown Chicago.
- West platform side: It is served by CTA's Pink Line to 54th Yard
