= Oak Park station (CTA Douglas branch) =

Rapid transit station in Chicago, 1924–1952

OAK PARK 6800W 2200S
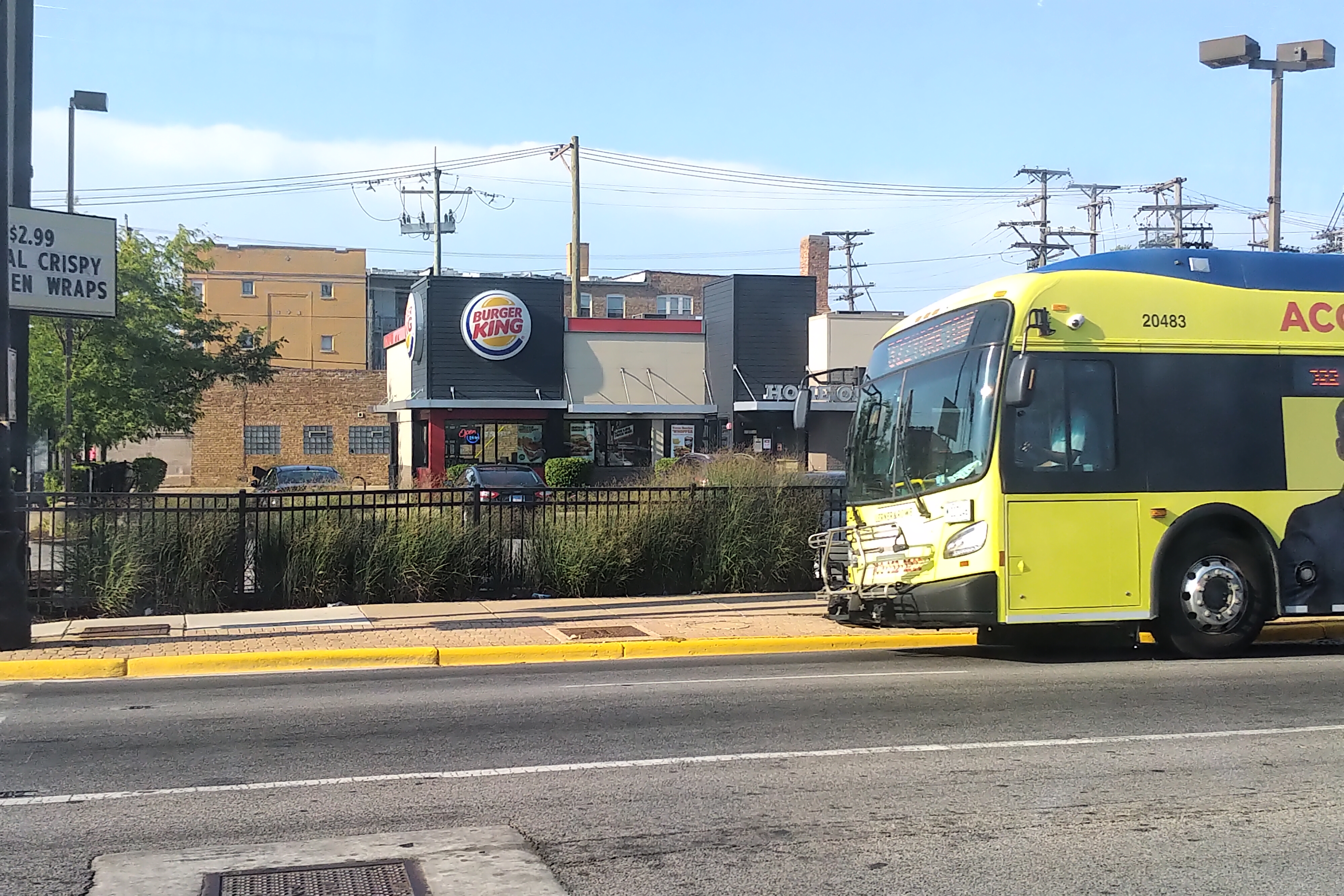
- The location of the station, in between the small brick building behind the Burger King and the larger brick building behind it, in 2023

General information
- Location: Berwyn, Illinois
- Coordinates: 41.8512°N 87.7933°W
- Owner: Chicago Transit Authority (1947–1952); Chicago Rapid Transit Company (1924–1947)
- Line: Douglas branch
- Platforms: 1 island platform
- Tracks: 2

Construction
- Structure type: Elevated

History
- Opened: March 16, 1924
- Closed: February 3, 1952

Former services
Preceding station	Chicago "L"	Following station
Terminus	Douglas branch	Ridgeland toward Marshfield
Location

Oak Park was a rapid transit station on the Chicago "L", where it was the westernmost extension of the Douglas Park branch in the suburb of Berwyn, from 1924 to 1952. Although the branch had originally been constructed starting from 1896 by the Metropolitan West Side Elevated Railroad Company, it did not reach Oak Park until March 16, 1924, by which time the Metropolitan had been subsumed by the Chicago Rapid Transit Company (CRT). Plans to extend the branch as far west as Harlem Avenue were made by the Metropolitan but were never done as development never justified it.

The terminal building itself was a simple clapboard frame structure with a peaked roof on an island platform, with the tracks on either side ending abruptly.

The Chicago Transit Authority (CTA) assumed operations of the "L" in 1947, and sought to streamline. In mid-1951, it proposed trimming the Douglas branch and instituting skip-stop on December 9 in concert with other reforms such as the discontinuation of the Westchester branch. Berwyn and adjacent Cicero sued the CTA and got an injunction to stop the branch reduction, but the matter was resolved in the CTA's favor and the branch was cut back to 54th/Cermak on February 3, 1952.
