= Project Onward =

- Formation: 2004
- Type: Nonprofit
- Legal status: 501(c)(3)
- Location: Chicago, Illinois
- President: Katherine Getz
- Revenue: $542k USD (2024)
- Website: https://www.projectonward.org/

Project Onward is a nonprofit art studio and gallery based in Chicago, Illinois, founded by Rob Lentz and Randy Vick in 2004. The organization supports adult artists with developmental disabilities and mental illnesses by providing professional guidance, studio space, and opportunities to sell and exhibit their work. Since 2013, it has operated as an independent nonprofit funded primarily by donations, and is located at the Bridgeport Art Center on Chicago's South Side.

== History ==
Project Onward was founded in 2004 in Chicago as a pilot program connected to the city’s Gallery 37 Youth Arts Initiative. The program was created in response to a lack of opportunities for participants with developmental or emotional disabilities who were aging out of youth arts programs and seeking to continue their artistic work in a structured environment.

In 2005, Project Onward was relocated to a larger studio space in the Chicago Cultural Center. In 2008 they moved to a studio in the same building on the first floor. Rob Lentz, founder of Project Onward, claimed this move had a positive effect on the organization due to the increased visibility.

In 2013, Project Onward became an independent nonprofit organization and moved to the Bridgeport Art Center on Chicago’s South Side. The new location provided expanded studio facilities and placed the organization within a community of professional artists. Since the expansion in 2013, Project Onward has held and attended a variety of events, such as art fairs and exhibitions.

== Operations ==
Project Onward operates as both a working studio and a public facing gallery space, supporting artists through structured programming and exhibitions. Artists are admitted through a portfolio review process that evaluates experience, commitment, and artistic development. The organization provides studio space, materials, and professional guidance through facilitators who offer advice and feedback to participating artists.

The program focuses on supporting artists with developmental disabilities or mental illness with an established artistic style rather than offering classroom-style instruction. Artwork created by participating artists is exhibited and sold through the gallery, with sales typically split evenly between the artist and the organization.

Artists in the program work across a range of media, including painting, ceramics, sculpture, and mixed media, and develop their work within a collaborative studio environment. The organization encourages artists to share ideas, provide feedback to one another, and experiment creatively within a supportive community.

Project Onward also hosts exhibition openings, events, and themed shows highlighting artists on the autism spectrum. Events hosted connect artists with collectors and the local art community, and the organization sells artwork by participating artists.

In 2022, the organization further expanded its programming with the opening of a ceramics studio at the Bridgeport Art Center, allowing artists to work with additional media.

== Funding ==
Project Onward is primarily funded through private donations and grants. According to publicly available nonprofit filings, the organization reports annual revenues exceeding $500,000, with the majority of funding derived from contributions. The organization transitioned to independent nonprofit status in 2013, enabling it to raise funds through charitable contributions. The Virginia Groot Foundation donated $300,000 in 2022. This donation was given in $100,000 installments over the span of three years, this helped a build ceramics studio that was able to take in 25 new artists.

== Events ==
- Art on Cardboard Show - Annual Event - An annual event with Project Onward in which artists created cardboard pieces of art designed to focus on the making of affordable art and how that can be achieved.
- Mom, Baseball, and Apple Pie - 2014 - An Americana exhibit where artists painted portraits of daily life.
- The Pet Portraits Picnic - 2014 - Neurodiverse artists drew pet portraits for guests at a picnic.
- "The Rookies", "Old School" - 2015 - Project Onward hosted two connected gallery's, in which one had a focus on new artists titled "The Rookies", and the other focused on founding members of Project Onward titled "Old School".
- Honoring Legendary African American Artists: Distinct Portraits by Disabled Artists - 2018 - Project Onward was hosted at the Bridgeport Art Center for an exhibition honoring African American artists.
- Imagined Spaces - 2021 - A virtual event showcasing neurodiverse artist's perspectives and their stories with the goal of changing perceptions the world has.
- The Brothers Juguilon in WNDR Museum - 2024- The Juguilon brothers share there creative ability to bring sculptures into paintings. the artist works were showcased in the WNDR museum.
- Outsiders Art Fair in New York City - 2026 - Project Onward will present work focused on "raw creativity" and the organization's work with artists with developmental disabilities or mental illnesses.
