= John M. Van Osdel =

American architect

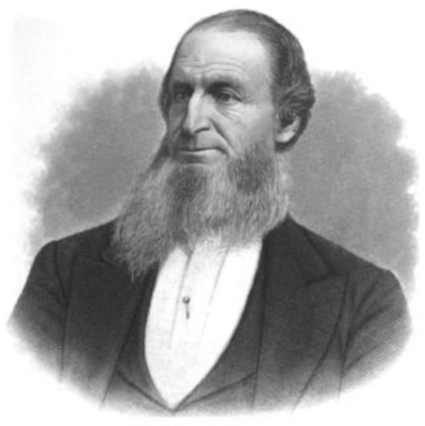
- Born: July 31, 1811; Baltimore, Maryland, US
- Died: December 21, 1891 (aged 80); Chicago, Illinois, US
- Occupation: Architect
- Spouses: Caroline Gaylor (m. 1831; died 1845) Martha McClellan (m. 1846)

John Mills Van Osdel (July 31, 1811 – December 21, 1891) was an American architect who is considered the first Chicago architect. He is considered a peer of the most prominent architects in the history of Chicago. He has also done significant work throughout Illinois and the Midwest, although much of it no longer exists.

== Early life ==
John M. Van Osdel was born in Baltimore, Maryland on July 31, 1811, the eldest son of carpenter James H. Van Osdel. During John's teenage years, James was temporarily paralyzed in an accident and the family thereafter struggled through poverty. To help the family, John began to work as a carpenter himself. He moved to New York, New York to work with his father once recovery was complete. In the city, Van Osdel found the Apprentice's Library, a catalogue of books related to carpentry and architecture. He returned to Baltimore in 1829 to work. The next year, Van Osdel began a profitable school for prospective draftsmen.

In 1836, after another relocation to New York, Van Osdel met New York State Assemblyman William B. Ogden. When Ogden moved west to Chicago, Illinois, he requested that Van Osdel follow him and design his house. After its completion, Van Osdel became engaged in steamboat construction, building the James Allen and George W. Dole. After construction began on the Illinois and Michigan Canal, Van Osdel built several water pumps and a horizontal windmill to aid with excavation. He returned to New York in 1840 to tend to his sick wife and to work as an associate editor for Rufus Porter's American Mechanic. The next year, after Van Osdel fell ill, he returned to Chicago.

== Later career ==
Van Osdel built some of the city's first grain elevators upon his return. In 1843, he co-founded an iron foundry and machine factory with Elihu Granger. With his health continuing to fail, he left the partnership two years later to focus on his architecture. Van Osdel opened an office on Clark Street, the first architectural office in Chicago. During his time there he designed the Cook County Courthouse, the Chicago City Hall, and the Tremont House. He also designed a house for Governor Joel Aldrich Matteson which later saw use as the Illinois Executive Mansion. By 1859, Van Osdel was making over US$32,000 (equivalent to $1,147,000 in 2025) in profit per year.

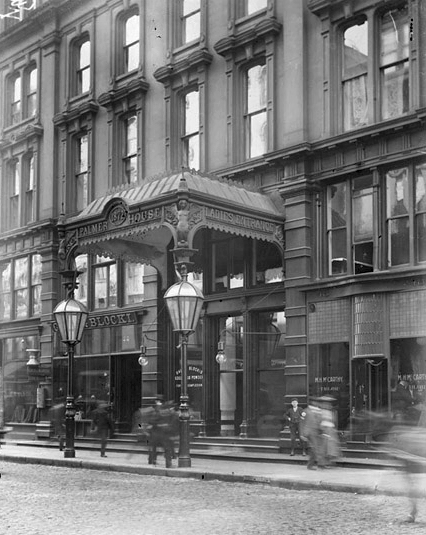
Palmer House Hotel Ladies Entrance, September 19, 1903

Van Osdel married Caroline Gailer on October 2, 1831. After her death on February 25, 1845, he married Martha McClellan on January 5, 1846. Van Osdel had no biological children, although he did adopt a few. He was named a trustee of the Illinois Industrial University, now known as the University of Illinois. As a member of its Committee on Buildings and Grounds, he was instrumental in the founding of a branch university in Chicago, today known as the University of Illinois at Chicago. Upon completion of the branch, he was named its treasurer. Politically, Van Osdel was active in the abolition movement. Previously unaffiliated, Van Osdel became a Republican in 1860, printing pamphlets supporting the party.

From 1876 through 1878, he served as a Chicago Alderman from the 9th ward.

== Reputation ==
He is considered a Chicago school architect and a peer of William LeBaron Jenney, Dankmar Adler, Louis Sullivan, Daniel Burnham, John Wellborn Root and Frank Lloyd Wright. In fact, he and William W. Boyington are considered the most prominent Chicago architects of the period from the city's incorporation in 1837 until the Great Chicago Fire of 1871.

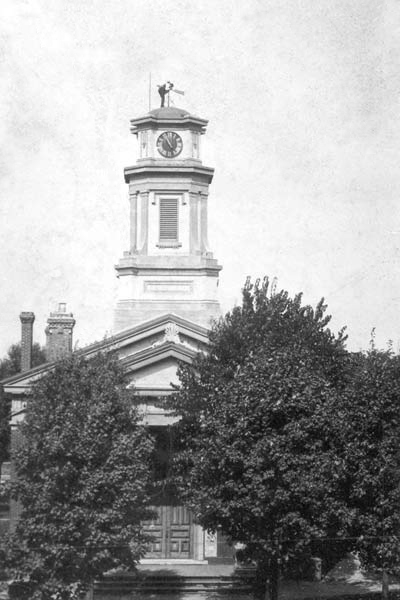
Second St. Joseph County Courthouse c. 1848 in La Porte County, Indiana

== Other buildings ==
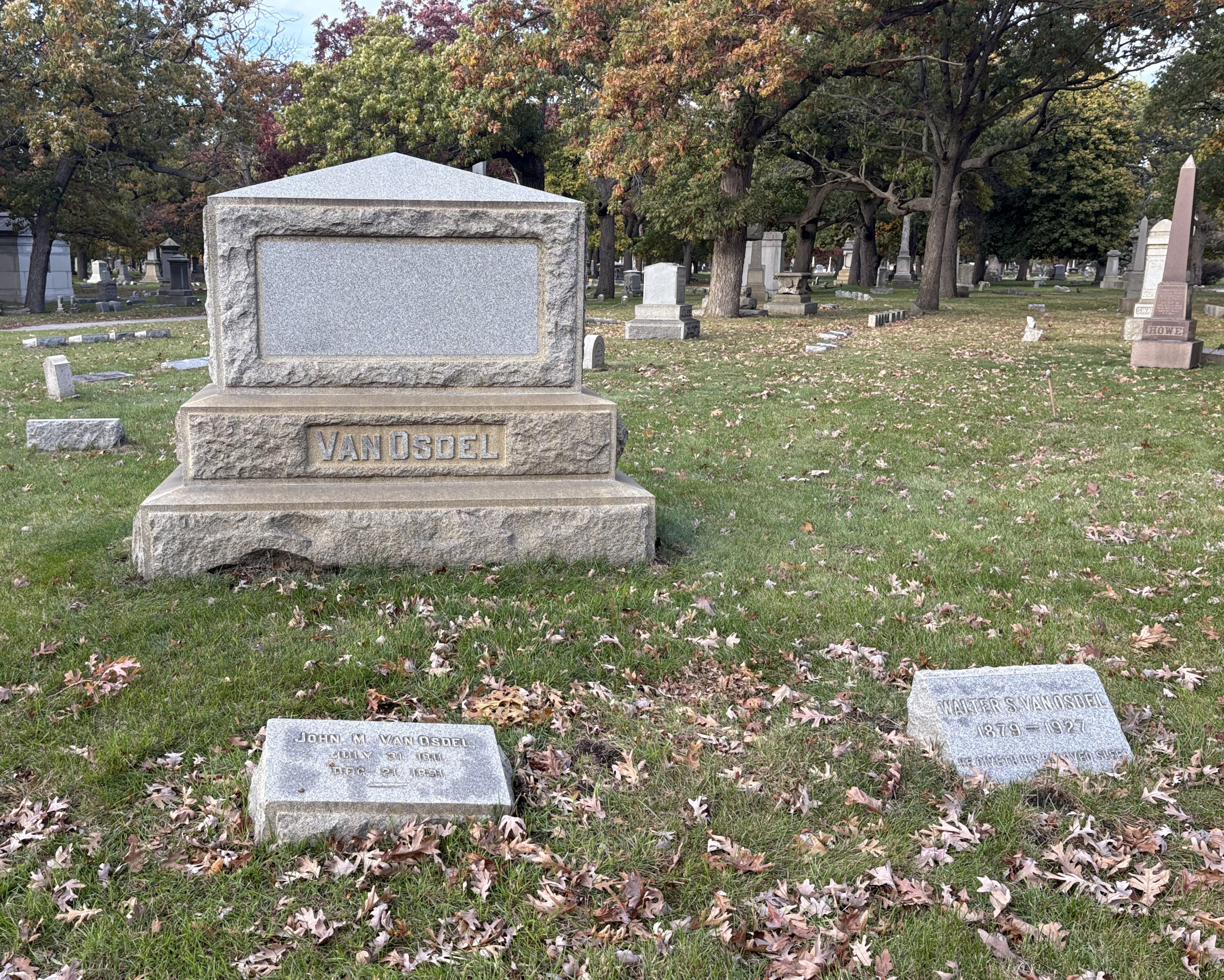
Van Osdel's grave at Rosehill Cemetery

Much of his work has been destroyed by fire, but remaining structures stand as local landmarks, with many listed on the National Register of Historic Places. Van Osdel designed the Palmer House, Tremont House and Page Brothers Building in Chicago, the Illinois Executive Mansion in Springfield, the state capital, the Old McHenry County Courthouse, Old Main at the University of Arkansas, and some courthouses in Indiana. He also designed the first cast-iron building for the Lake Street central business district. Chicago City Hall sits on the site of a former Van Osdel building that housed a county courthouse and city hall. Van Osdel's 1872 McCarthy Building was demolished along with the rest of Block 37 in 1987 despite its Chicago Landmark status. Another work is Second St. Joseph County Courthouse, 1854; South Bend St. Joseph County, Indiana.

Van Osdel died at age 80 in Chicago in 1891, and was buried at Rosehill Cemetery.
