= McCarthy Building (Chicago) =

Building in Chicago

Coordinates: 41°53′0.4″N 87°37′44.6″W

- McCarthy Building on the southwest corner of Block 37.
- Interactive map of the McCarthy Building area

General information
- Location: 32 West Washington Street; Chicago, Illinois; United States
- Completed: 1872
- Demolished: 1989

Technical details
- Floor count: 5

Design and construction
- Architect: John M. Van Osdel
- McCarthy Building
- Formerly listed on the U.S. National Register of Historic Places
- NRHP reference No.: 76000698

Significant dates
- Added to NRHP: June 16, 1976
- Removed from NRHP: December 8, 1995

McCarthy Building was a five-story Chicago Landmark building in the Loop community area of Chicago, Illinois. Located in the southwest corner of the block on the northeast corner of North Dearborn Street and West Washington Street, the John M. Van Osdel designed building had been erected in 1872, but was demolished in 1989 during the clearing of what is known as Chicago's Block 37. In order to make way for Chicago Mayor Richard M. Daley's redevelopment, the Chicago City Council had to revoke the privately owned building's landmark status in 1987.

== Property history ==
The McCarthy building was on a piece of land owned by the McCarthy family for 100 years. It was bought by John Patrick McCarthy on May 1, 1847, and he built a home there for his family, which included six children. After the home burned in the Chicago fire of 1871, Mrs. McCarthy built a new home on a triangular tract of land farther south in Chicago, at Cottage Grove Ave. & 35th St., where Vincennes starts. Replacing the burned home was the five-story McCarthy building, which had a fireplace in every room. It had no elevator, but also no mortgage during the time the McCarthys owned it. From 1901 until at least 1947, the building was under lease to the Washington Shirt Co., which sublet the upper floors and two other street-level shops. The building was bought by a syndicate in 1946 for $550,000, the highest per-square-foot price—$180.92—in the neighborhood at that time.

== Revocation of landmark status ==
The revocation of the landmark status was a hotly contested legal battle. In Landmarks Preservation Council v. City of Chicago, (125 Ill. 2d 164 (1988)) the Illinois Supreme Court refused to recognize the standing of several groups to challenge Chicago City Council ordinance that removed landmark status. The court found that the Landmarks Preservation Council of Illinois and the Chicago Chapter, American Institute of Architects lacked legal standing to make such a challenge because they could not "gain standing merely through a self-proclaimed concern about an issue, no matter how sincere." The court specifically rejected, as bases for standing, both the aesthetic interests of these parties and their "alleged right to participate in a public hearing" regarding the ordinance where the "municipality has bestowed that alleged procedural right apparently not as a legal entitlement but as a tool to assist the municipality in performing its legislative function."

== 22 West Washington ==
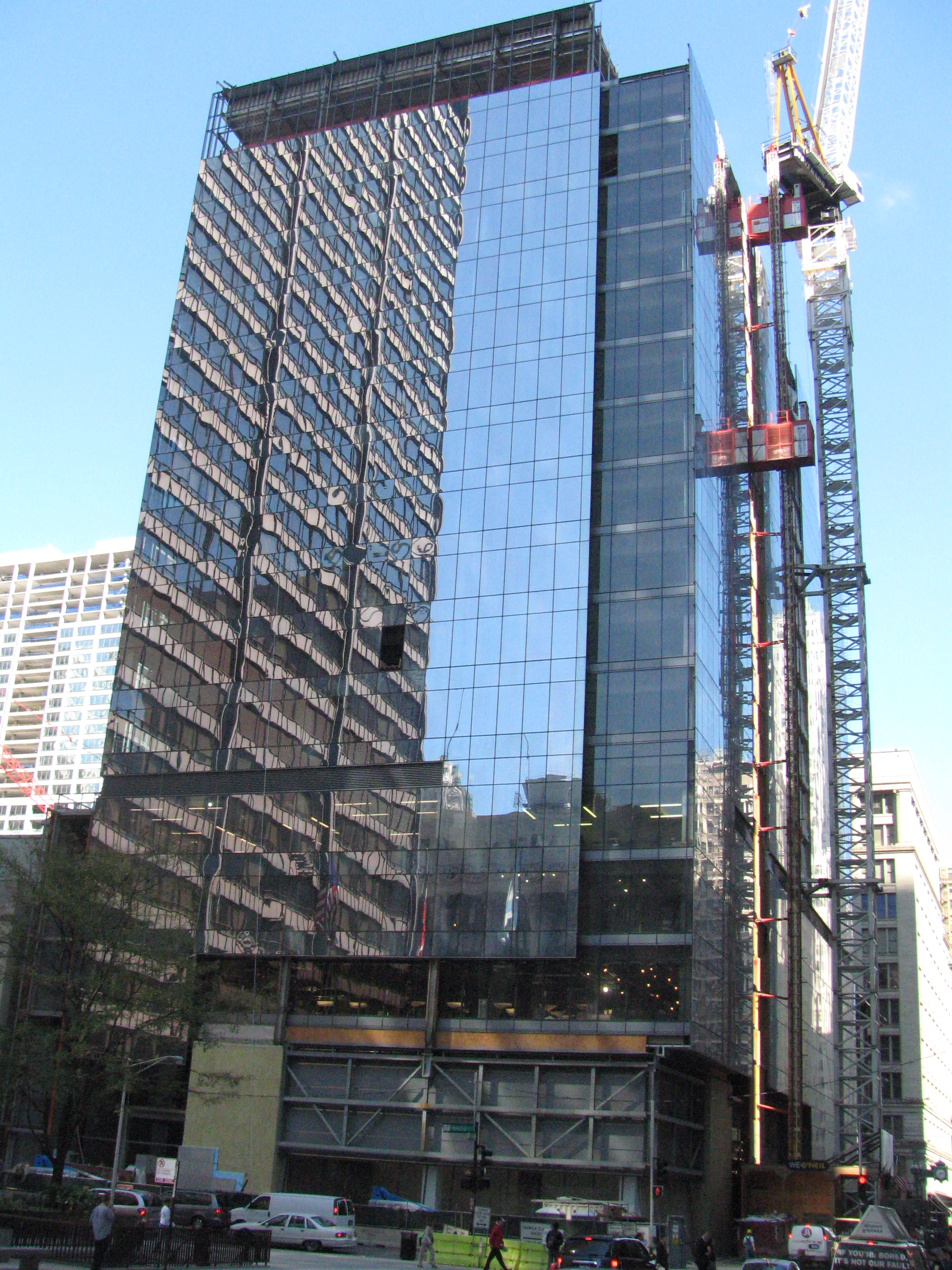
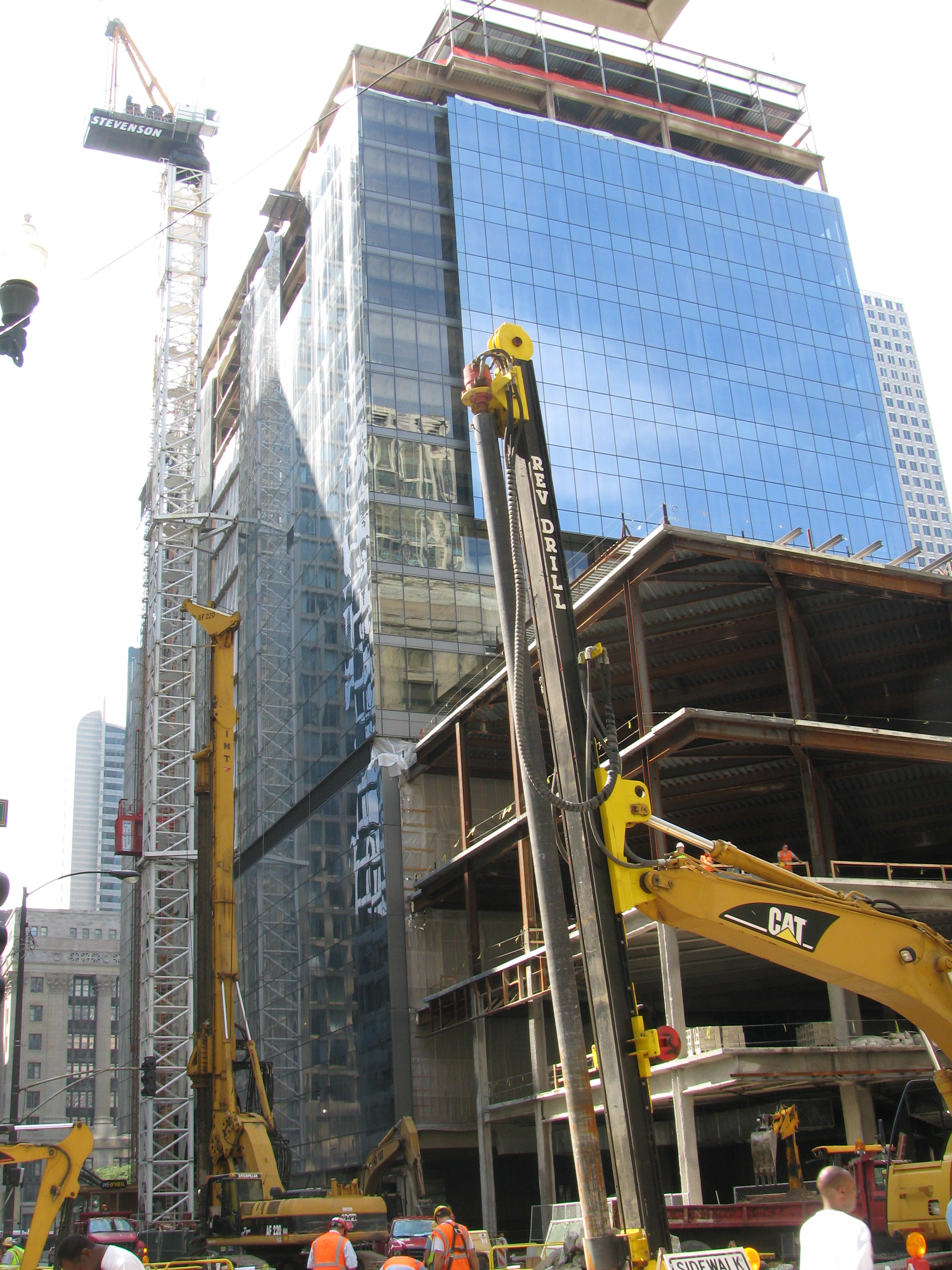
Construction photos of the new 22 West Washington Building, the first of the new 108 North State Street structures (September 26, 2007. Left from west, right from east)

The long-delayed Block 37 retail and office complex opened in 2009. The office building with the address of 22 West Washington occupies the former site of the McCarthy Building.

== See also ==
- McCarthy Building (disambiguation)
