= The Palmer House Hilton =

Historic hotel in Chicago, Illinois

Palmer House - A Hilton Hotel
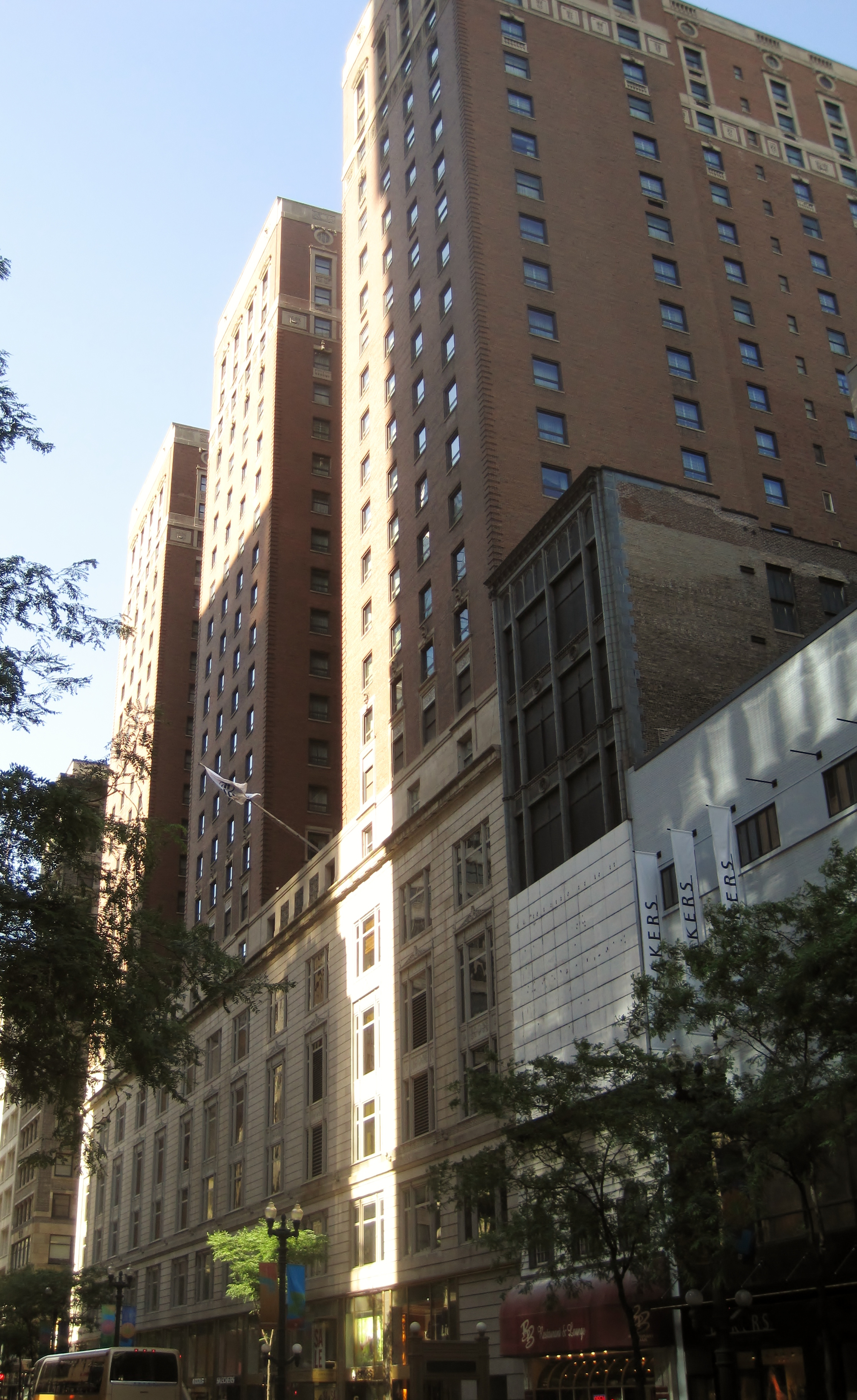
- The Palmer House Hotel

- Location within Chicago metropolitan area
- 41.880344°N 87.626910°W
- Location: 17 E Monroe Street, Chicago, Illinois

History
- Built: 1870
- Rebuilt: 1923–1925

Site notes
- Area: Chicago Loop
- Architect(s): John M. Van Osdel (2nd); Holabird & Roche (current)

Chicago Landmark
- Designated: December 13, 2006

The Palmer House – A Hilton Hotel is a historic hotel in Chicago's Loop area, the third by that name. The first opened in 1870, and the present building in 1925. In the 19th century, the Palmer House was the city's first hotel with elevators, and the first hotel with electric light bulbs and telephones in the guest rooms. The hotel has been dubbed the longest continuously operating hotel in North America, although it temporarily closed in 2020-2021, due to the COVID-19 pandemic. It is a member of the Historic Hotels of America program of the National Trust for Historic Preservation.

== History ==
=== First hotel ===
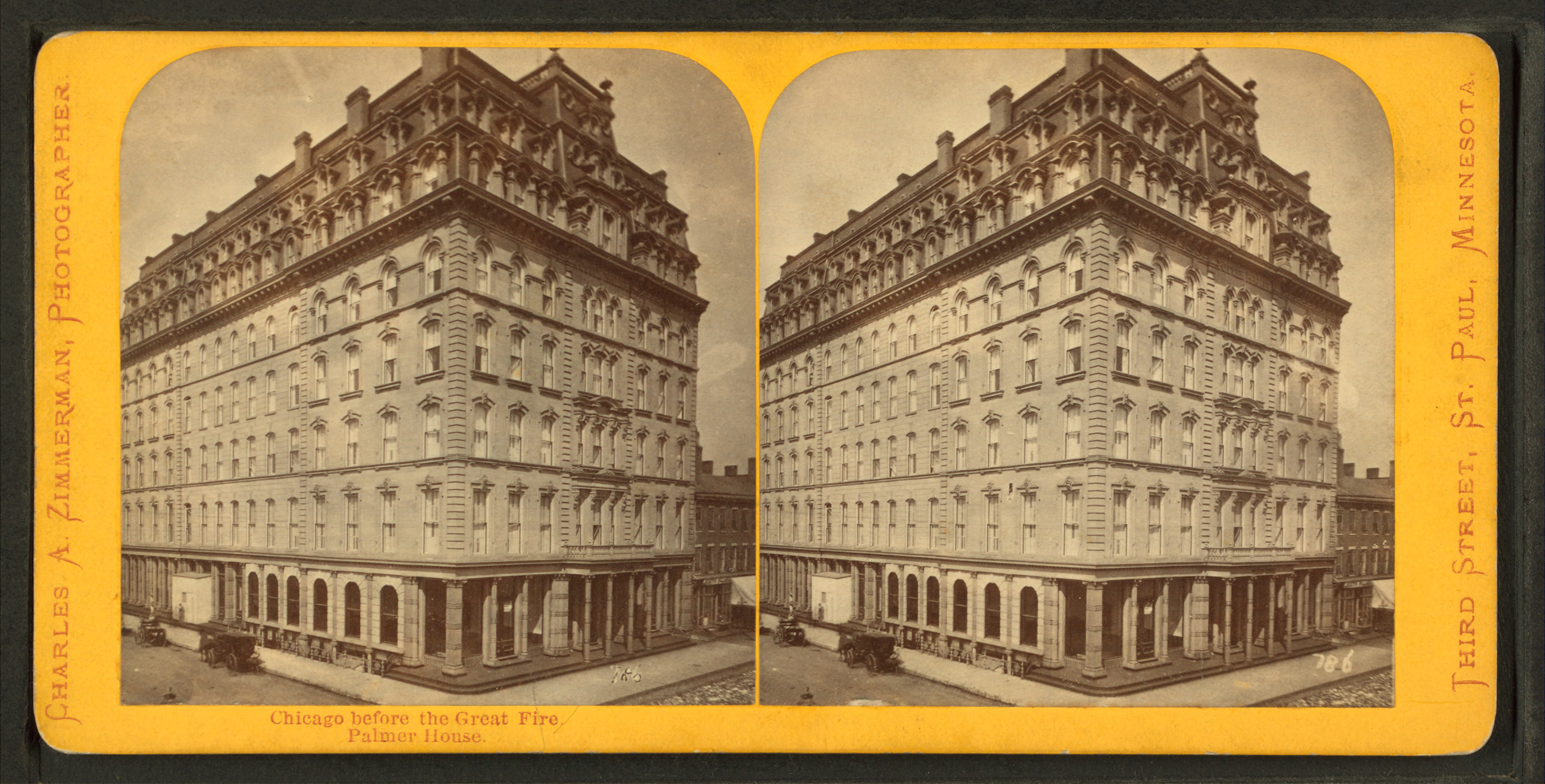
Stereoscopic view of the first Palmer House

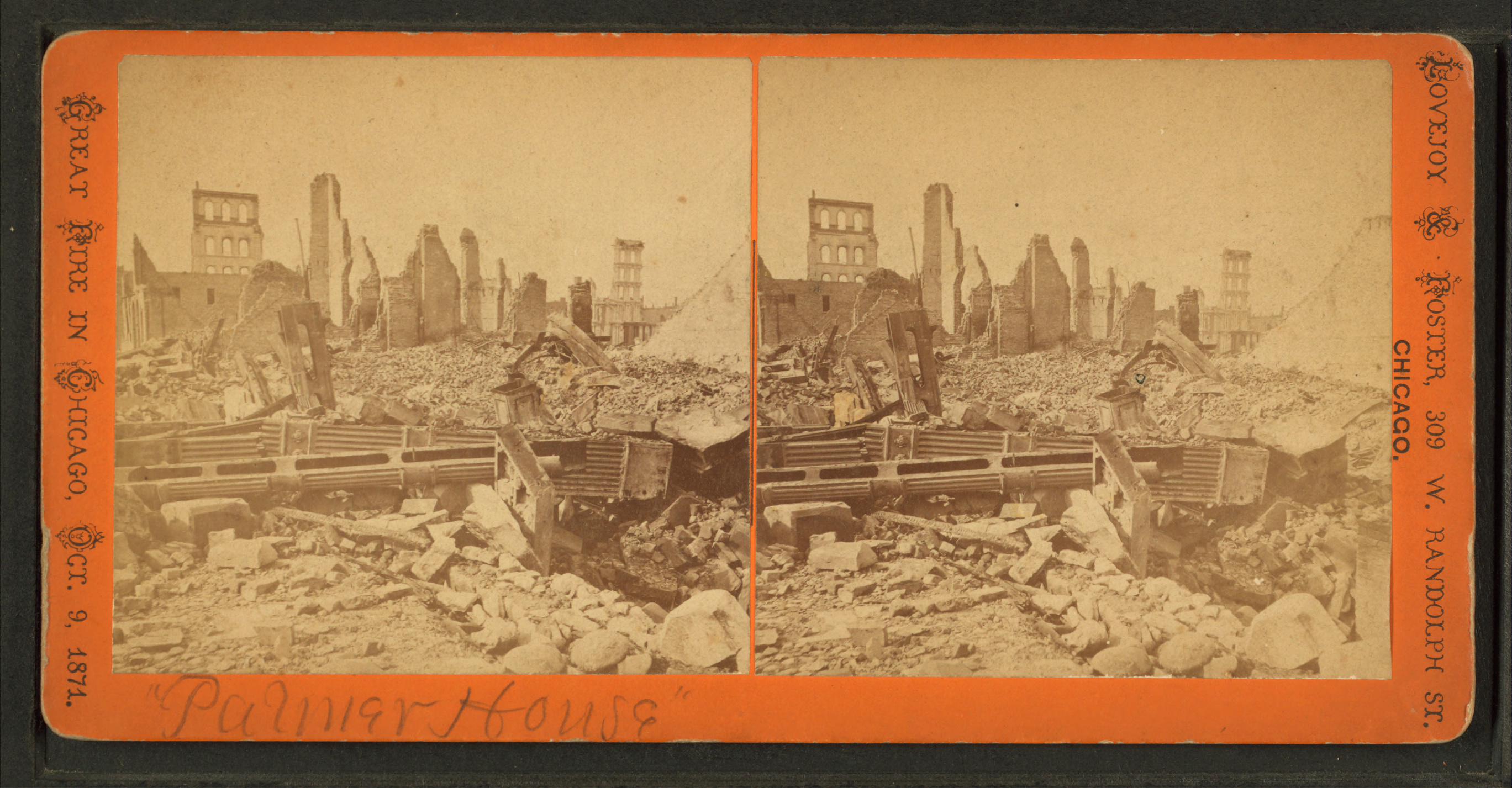
Stereoscopic view of the ruins of the first Palmer House after the Great Chicago Fire

The first Palmer House was built as a wedding present from Potter Palmer to his bride Bertha Honoré. Located at State and Quincy, it opened on September 26, 1870. It burned one year later on October 9, 1871, during the Great Chicago Fire. Palmer had already begun construction of a new hotel at State and Monroe prior to the disaster.

=== Second hotel ===
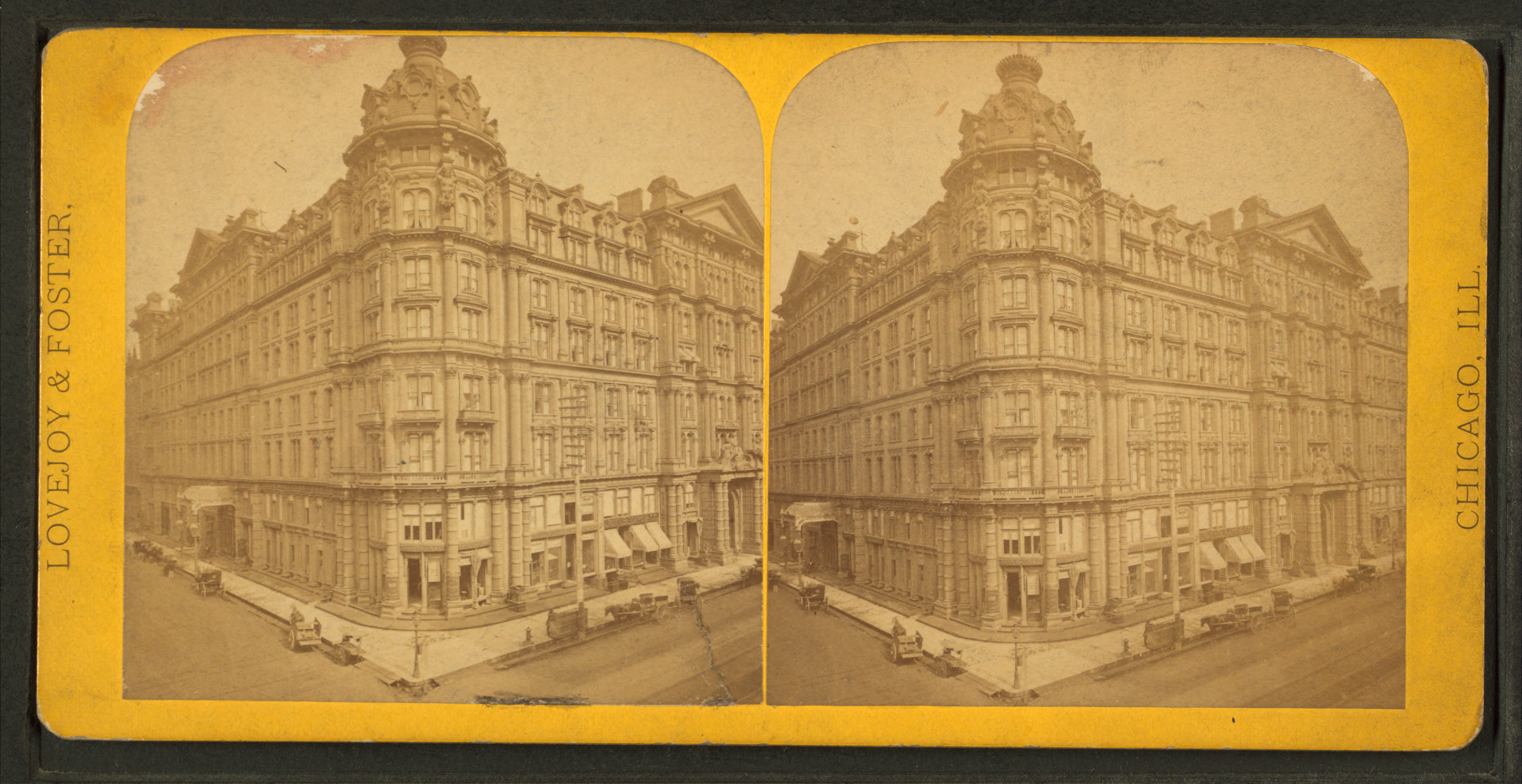
Stereoscopic view of the second Palmer House

The second Palmer House Hotel was a seven story, 225 room structure designed by architect John M. Van Osdel. Its amenities included oversized rooms, luxurious decor, and sumptuous meals served in grand style. The floor of its barber shop was tiled and silver dollars were embedded in a diamond pattern.

Construction began on September 26, 1871, thirteen days before the Great Chicago Fire. It was completed in 1875, and widely advertised as "The World's Only Fire Proof Hotel." Famous visitors included presidential hopefuls James Garfield, Grover Cleveland, Ulysses S. Grant, William Jennings Bryan, and William McKinley; writers Mark Twain, L. Frank Baum, and Oscar Wilde; actresses Sarah Bernhardt and Eleonora Duse, and French cabaret singer Yvette Guilbert in 1897. An 1895 meeting at the hotel of faculty representatives from various Midwestern universities resulted in the founding of the Big Ten Conference.

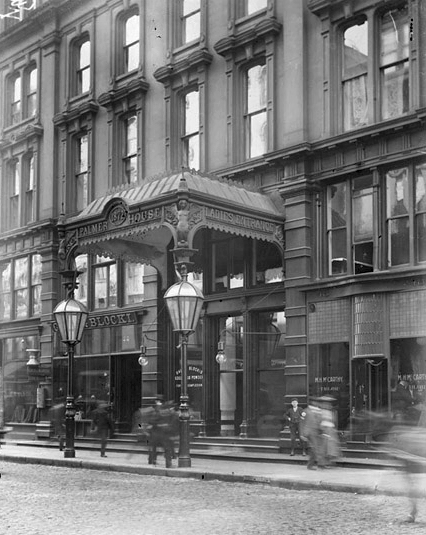
Palmer House Hotel Ladies Entrance (September 19, 1903)

=== Third hotel ===
The current Palmer House was built in the early to mid-1920s. By that time the business in downtown Chicago could support a much larger hotel, and the Palmer Estate hired Holabird & Roche to design a new 25-story facility with well over 1,000 rooms. Between 1923 and 1925, a new structure went up on the same site. Construction occurred as part of a 1920s hotel boom in Chicago, which was spurred by demand in the Chicago hotel market having overtaken supply due to the extent of Chicago's growth in economy and population, and its increased use as a location for conventions. The new building opened with 2,268 rooms, briefly being the largest hotel in the world by room count.

In December 1945, Conrad Hilton bought the Palmer House for $20 million (equivalent to $358 million in 2025), thereafter known as The Palmer House Hilton. In 2005, Hilton sold the property to Thor Equities, but retained management through the Hilton chain.

The architecture firms of Loebl Schlossman & Hackl and David Fleener Architects completely renovated and restored the hotel between 2007 and 2009. The total cost was over $170 million (equivalent to $255 million in 2025). The hotel has a total of 1,639 guest rooms, second in the city only to the Hyatt Regency Chicago. It has recently had its name adjusted to Palmer House - A Hilton Hotel.

Entertainers who have appeared at the Palmer House's Empire Room have included Frank Sinatra, Judy Garland, Liberace, Ella Fitzgerald, Bob Fosse, Maurice Chevalier, Lena Horne, Nat King Cole, Louis Armstrong, Harry Belafonte, Sammy Davis Jr., Peggy Lee, Carol Channing, Bobby Darin, Jimmy Durante, Sonny & Cher, Liza Minnelli, Dionne Warwick, Sophie Tucker, Tommy Dorsey, Phyllis Diller, Lou Rawls, Shep Fields (1930s) Dick Gregory (1963), Frankie Laine (1963), Josh White (1966), Tony Bennett (1968), Florence Henderson (1968), Donald O'Connor (1971), Jerry Lewis (1971), The Supremes (1971 & 1972),Jane Powell (1972), Lorna Luft (1972), Trini Lopez (1973), The Lettermen (1973) and many others.

The hotel closed in March 2020 due to the COVID-19 pandemic. In August 2020, Wells Fargo filed suit against Thor Equities for defaulting on a $333 million commercial mortgage (equivalent to $414 million in 2025).

The hotel reopened on June 17, 2021, following a series of upgrades to its interior, including a renovation to its indoor pool.

== Gallery ==
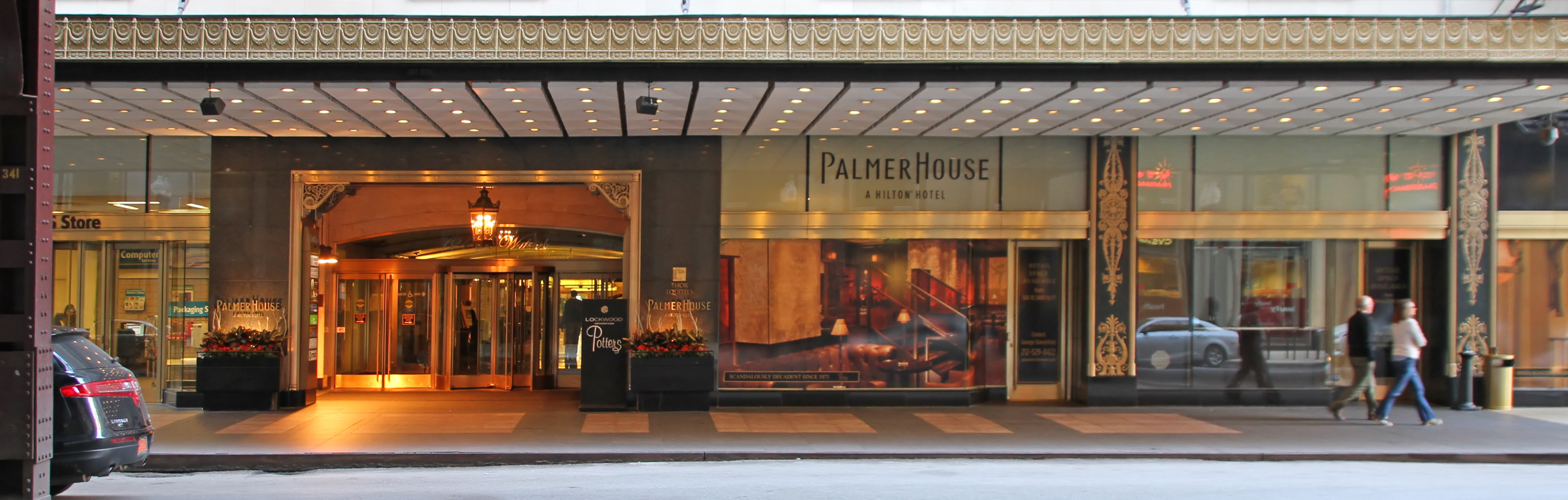
Main Entrance, Monroe Street

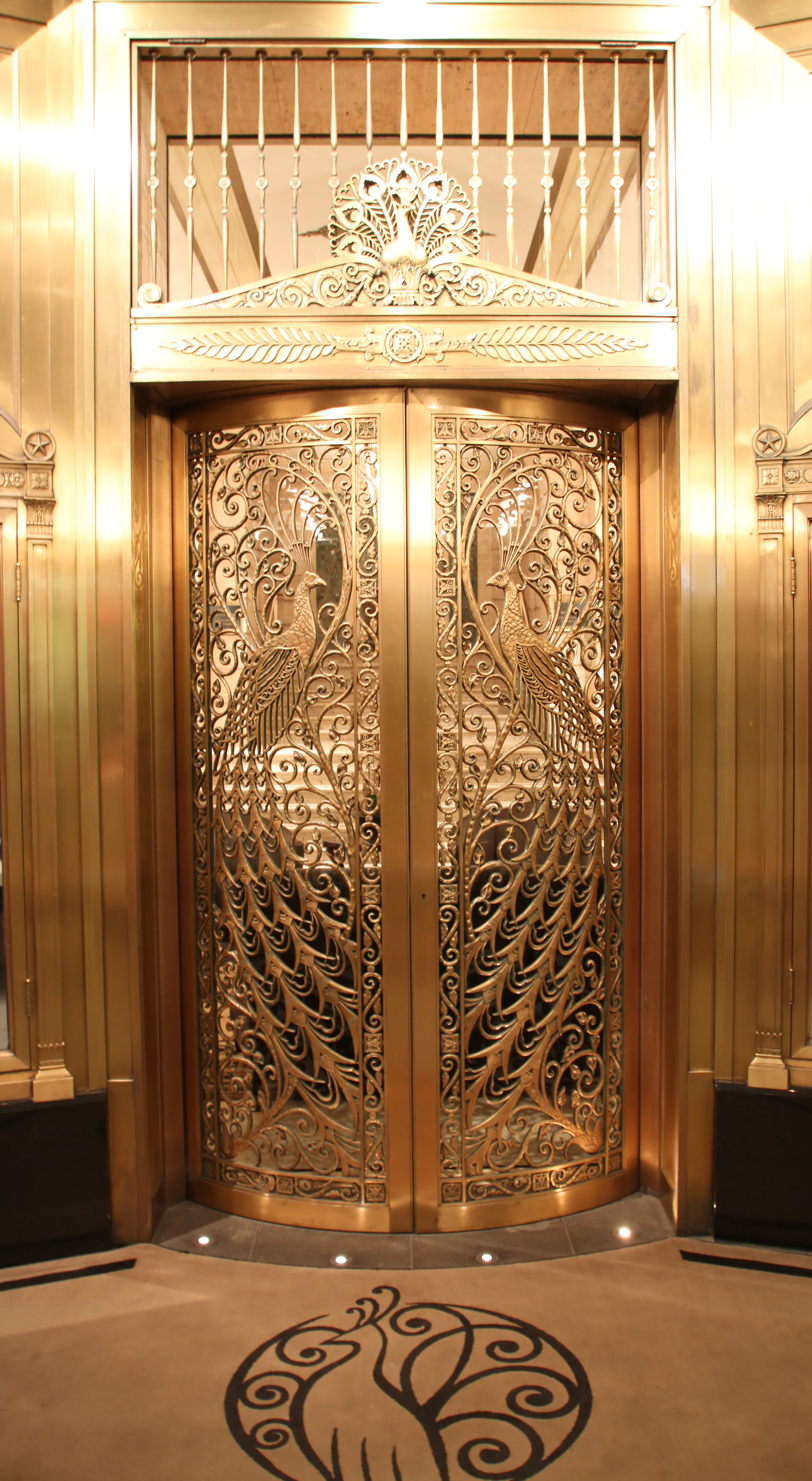
Peacock Door in the lobby

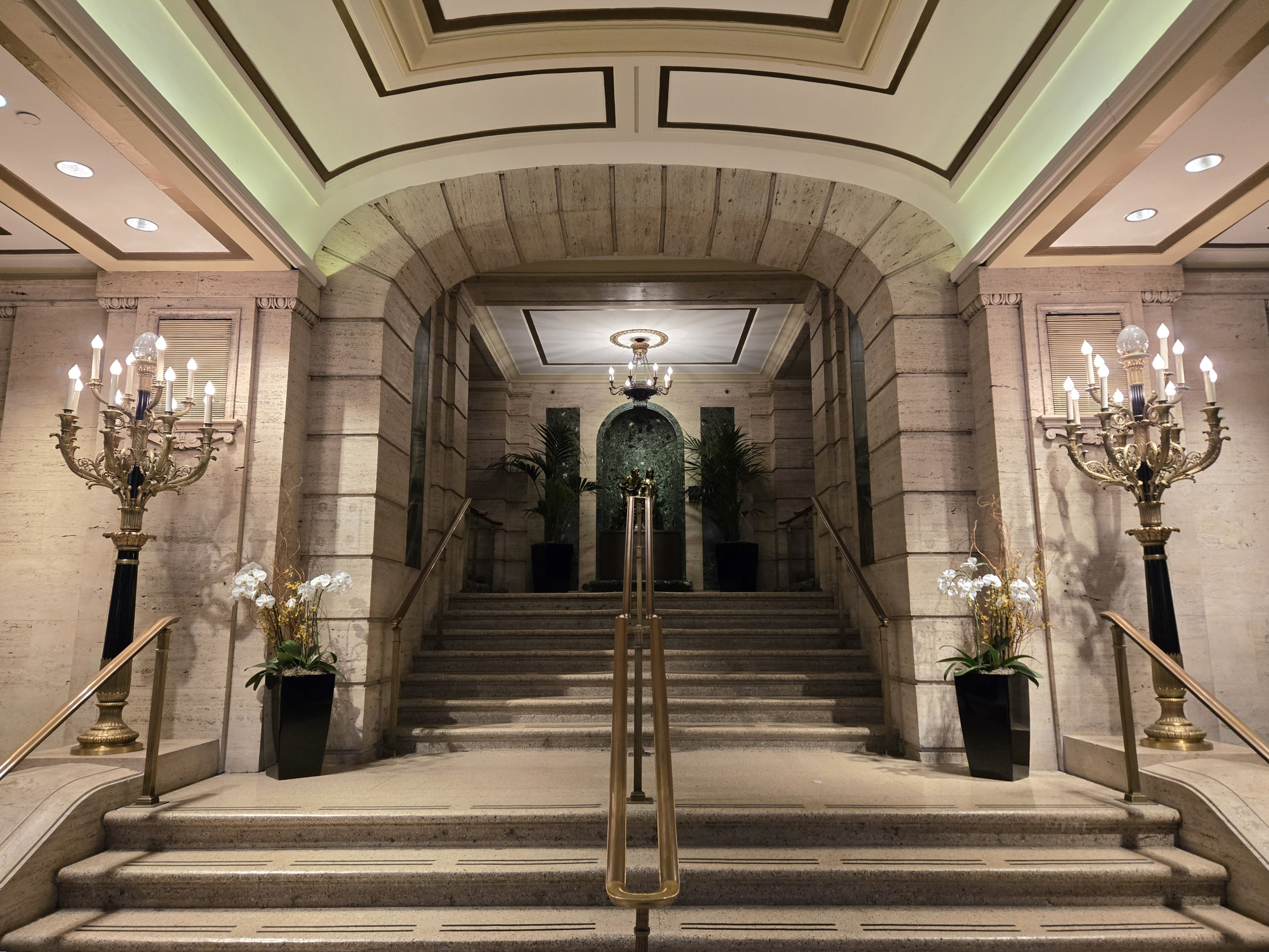
Staircase to the Grand Lobby

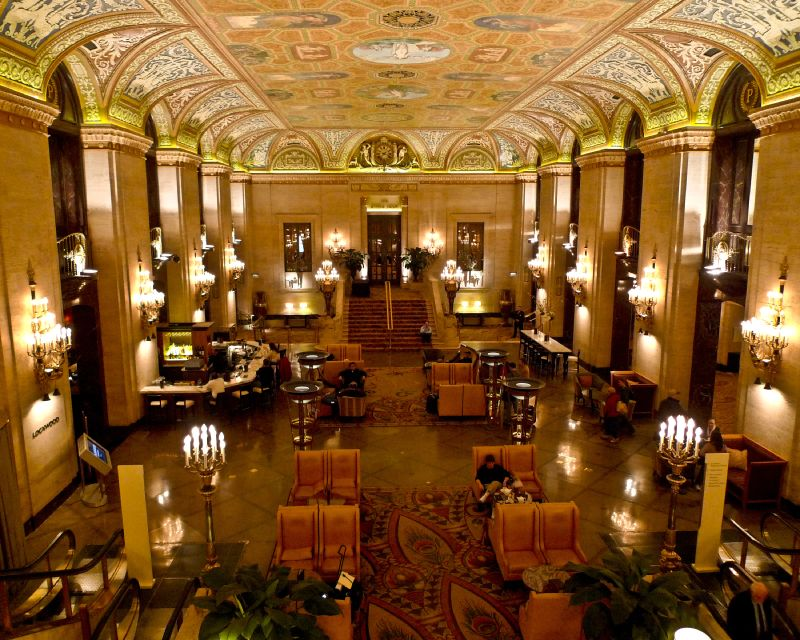
Palmer House Hilton Grand Lobby; three Palmer House hotels have been located on State Street in Chicago

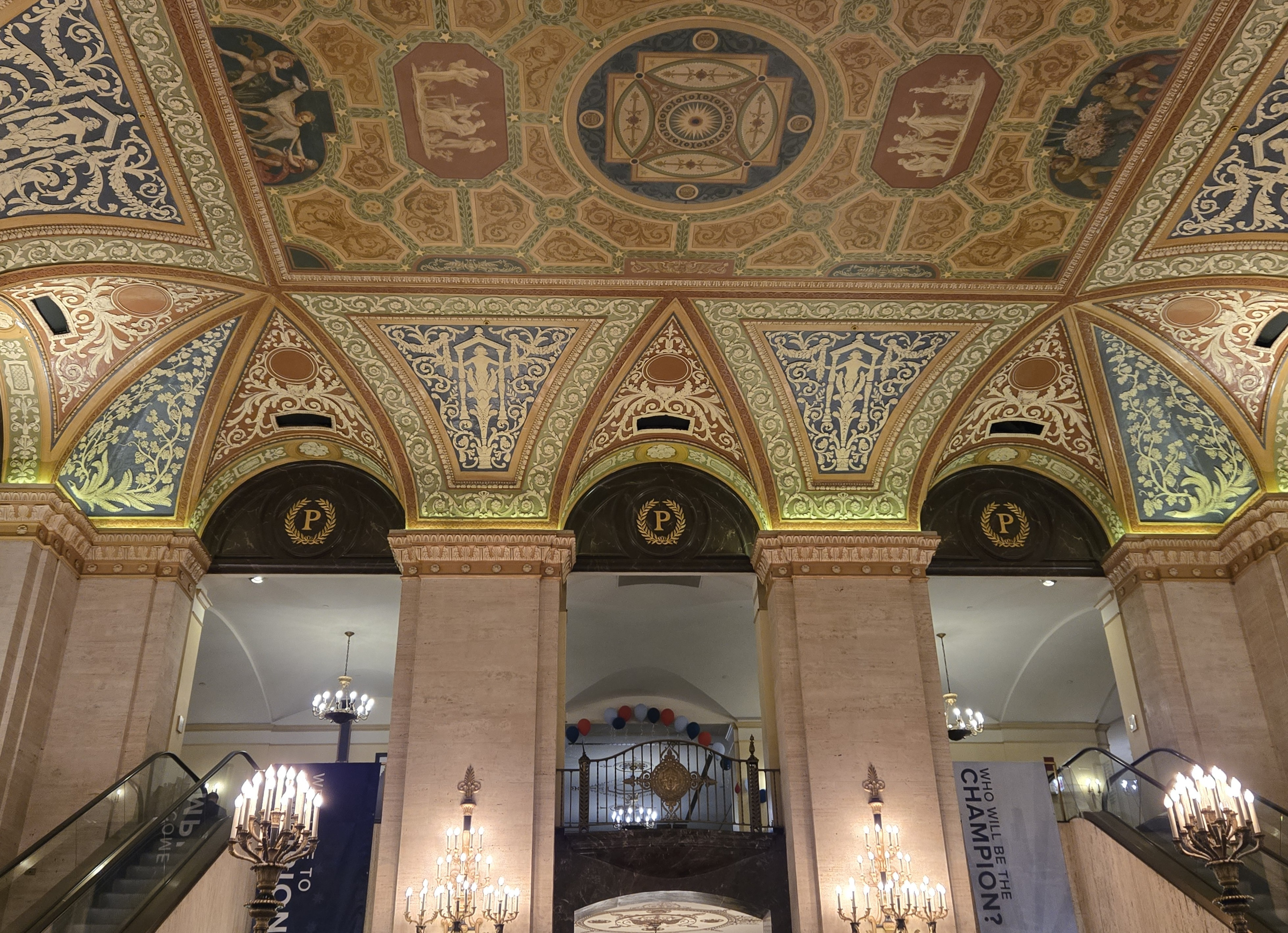
Ballroom Level from the Grand Lobby

Empire Room

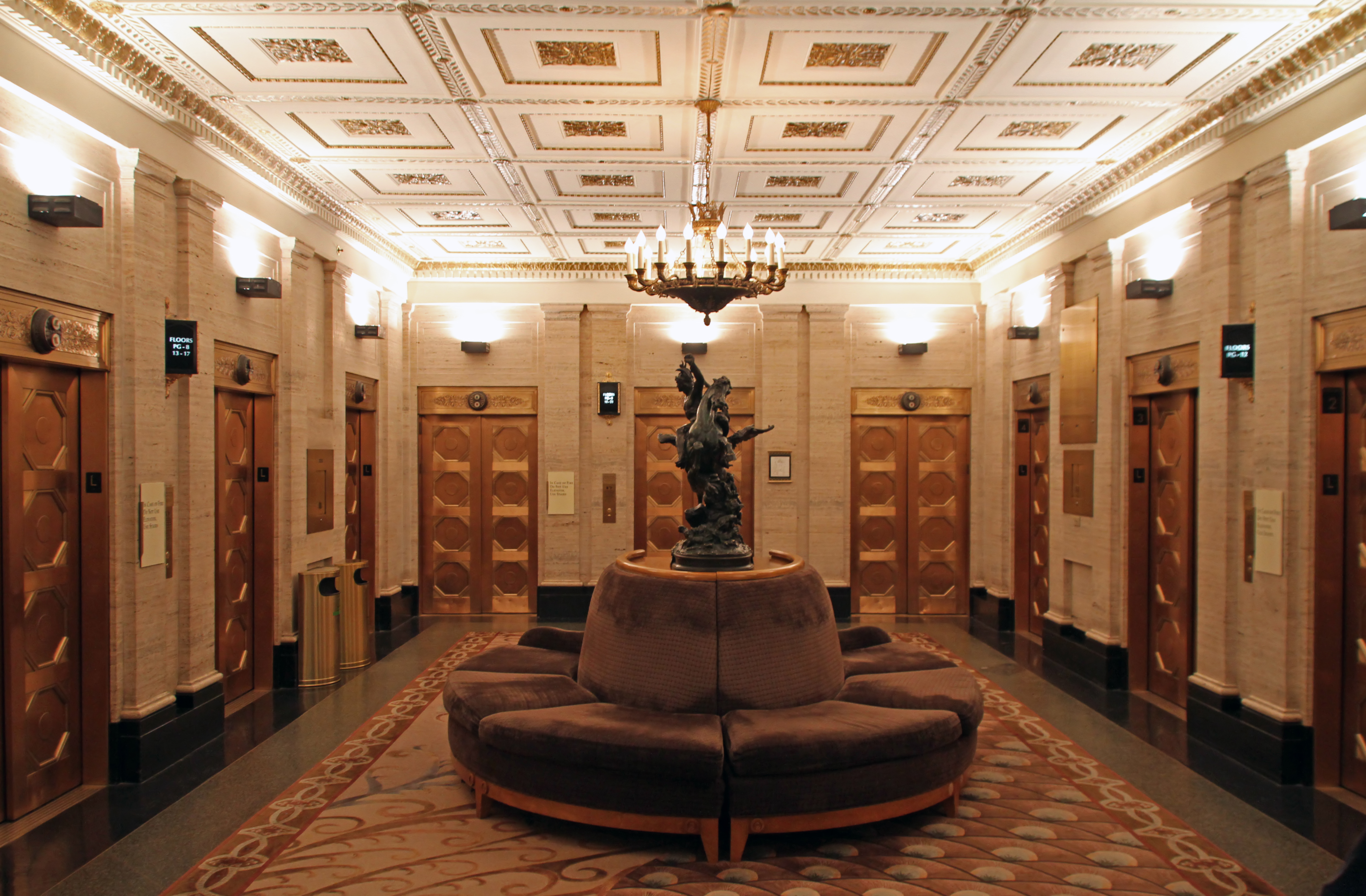
Palmer House Hilton Elevators and Bellerophon Sculpture by Pierre-Eugène-Emile

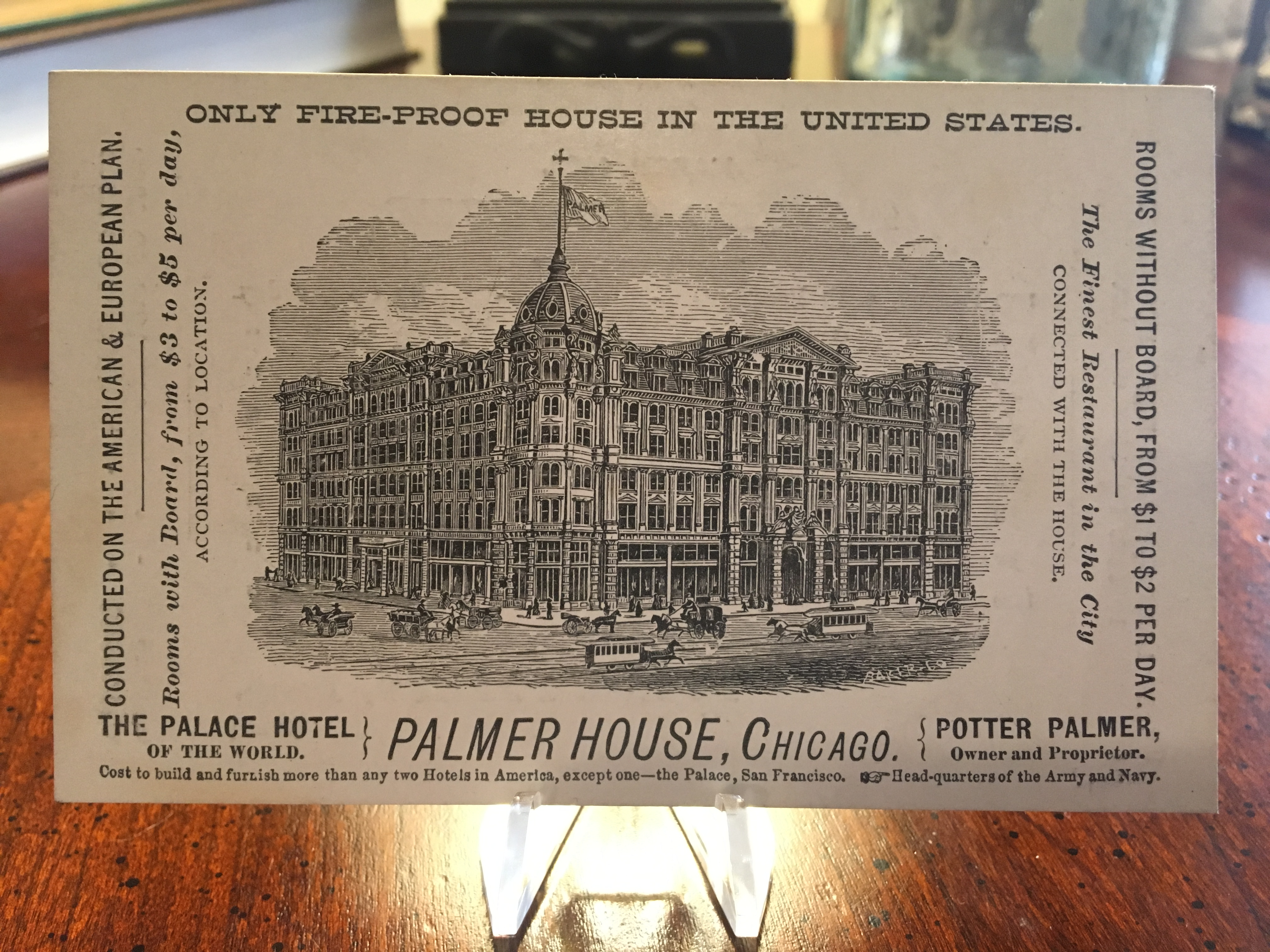
1875 Palmer House Business Card

== See also ==
- Chocolate brownie - invented at the second Palmer House Hotel for the World's Columbian Exposition in 1893.
