= Second St. Joseph County Courthouse =

- Old Courthouse (Second St. Joseph County Courthouse)
- U.S. National Register of Historic Places
- U.S. Historic district – Contributing property
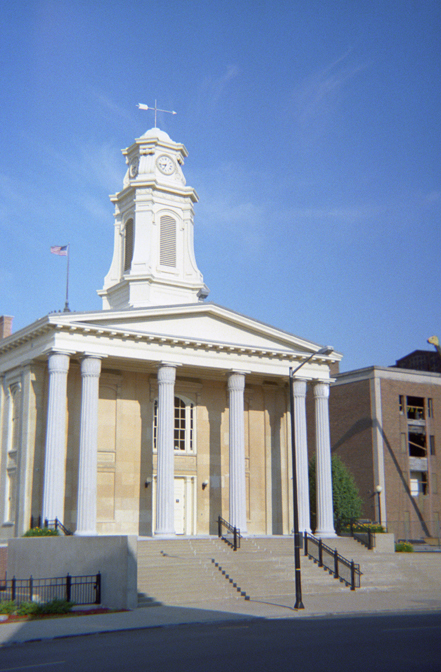
- Old Courthouse, June 2006

- Location within Indiana Location within the United States
- Location: 112 S. Lafayette Blvd., South Bend, Indiana
- Coordinates: 41°38′58″N 86°15′0″W
- Area: 0.3 acres (0.12 ha)
- Built: 1853
- Architect: Van Osdel, John M.
- Architectural style: Greek Revival
- NRHP reference No.: 70000007
- Added to NRHP: September 4, 1970

Old Courthouse, also known as the Second St. Joseph County Courthouse, is a historic courthouse located at South Bend, Indiana. It was designed by architect John M. Van Osdel (1811–1891) and built in 1853. It is a two-story, Greek Revival style stone building. The building measures 61 feet wide and 93 feet deep. It features a projecting front portico supported by Doric order columns and a front gable roof topped by a cupola. It was moved to its present site in 1896. Following construction of the Third St. Joseph County Courthouse, the building housed the local G.A.R. chapter and historical museum. The building now houses office of the Traffic and Misdemeanor Court and Small Claims Court.

It was listed on the National Register of Historic Places in 1970. It is located in the West Washington Historic District.
