= Gallery 37 =

Non-profit youth organization based in Chicago

Gallery 37 is a not-for-profit organization in Chicago. Its purpose is to attract artistically inclined city youth to work as apprentice artists at a vacant downtown lot known as Block 37.

== Details ==
Gallery 37 was created in 1991 by Chicago's Department of Cultural Affairs' Lois Weisberg and Maggie Daley, wife of the city's former mayor, Richard M. Daley. Its purpose is to attract artistically inclined city youth to work as apprentice artists at a vacant downtown lot known as Block 37, bound by State, Dearborn, Washington, and Randolph streets.

Gallery 37 currently houses Chicago Public Schools' Advanced Arts Program, a magnet arts program open to CPS Upperclassmen who want to pursue careers in the arts and After School Matters. ASM is a not-for-profit organization that partners with the City of Chicago, the Chicago Public Schools, the Chicago Park District, the Chicago Public Library, the Chicago Department of Family and Support Services, the Chicago Department of Cultural Affairs, and Community-Based Organizations to expand out-of-school opportunities for Chicago teens.

Advanced Arts Programming is open to juniors and seniors within Chicago Public Schools; students have to meet GPA, attendance, and pass a rigorous interview process. After School Matters is open to young people between the ages of 14 and 21 living within Chicago city limits. Advanced Arts Programs run throughout the school year at Gallery 37, and After School Matters Courses run year round.

== General references ==
- Advanced Arts Program
- After School Matters
