= Block 37 =

Development in Chicago, Illinois

108 North State Street Block 37
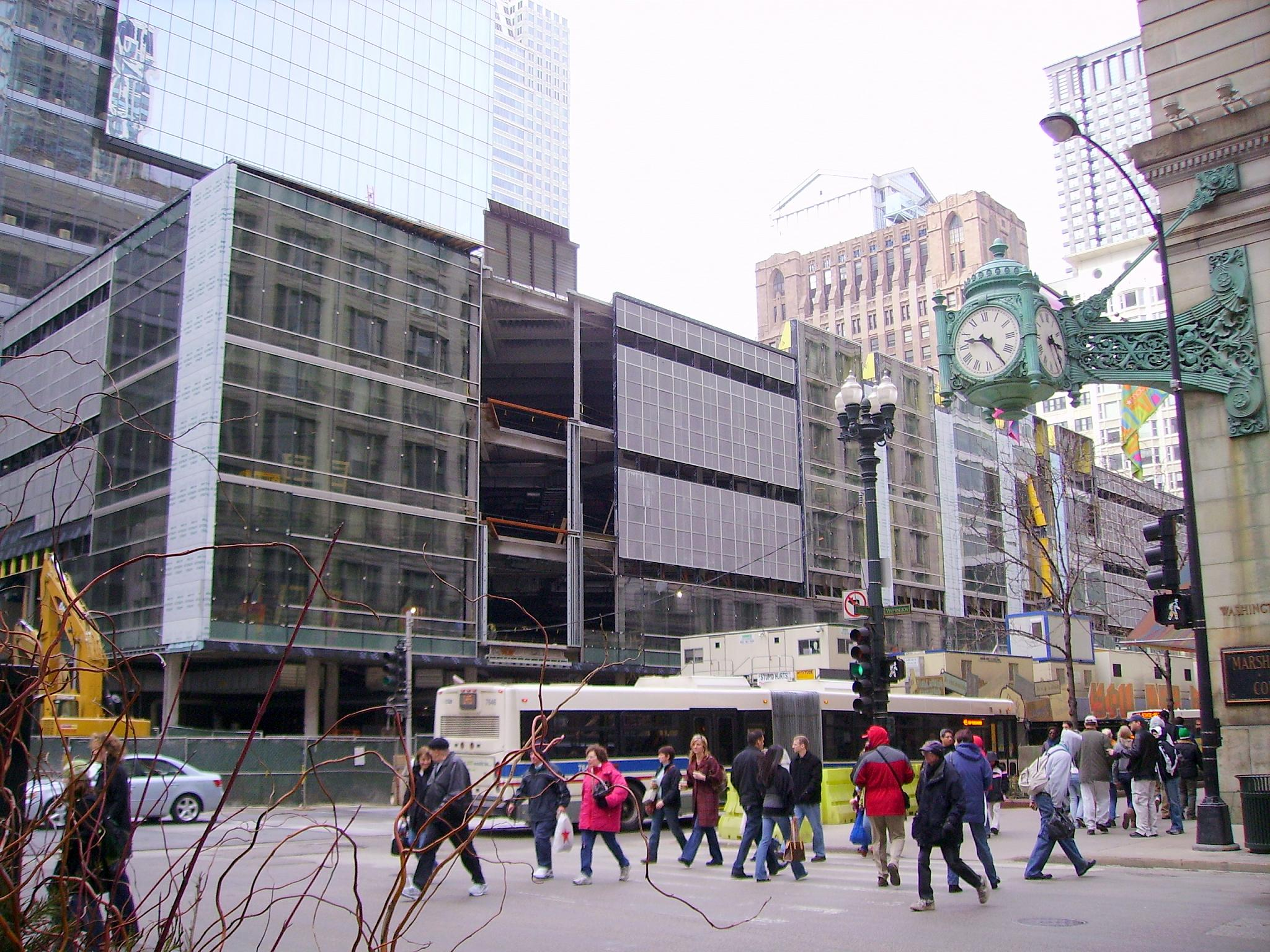
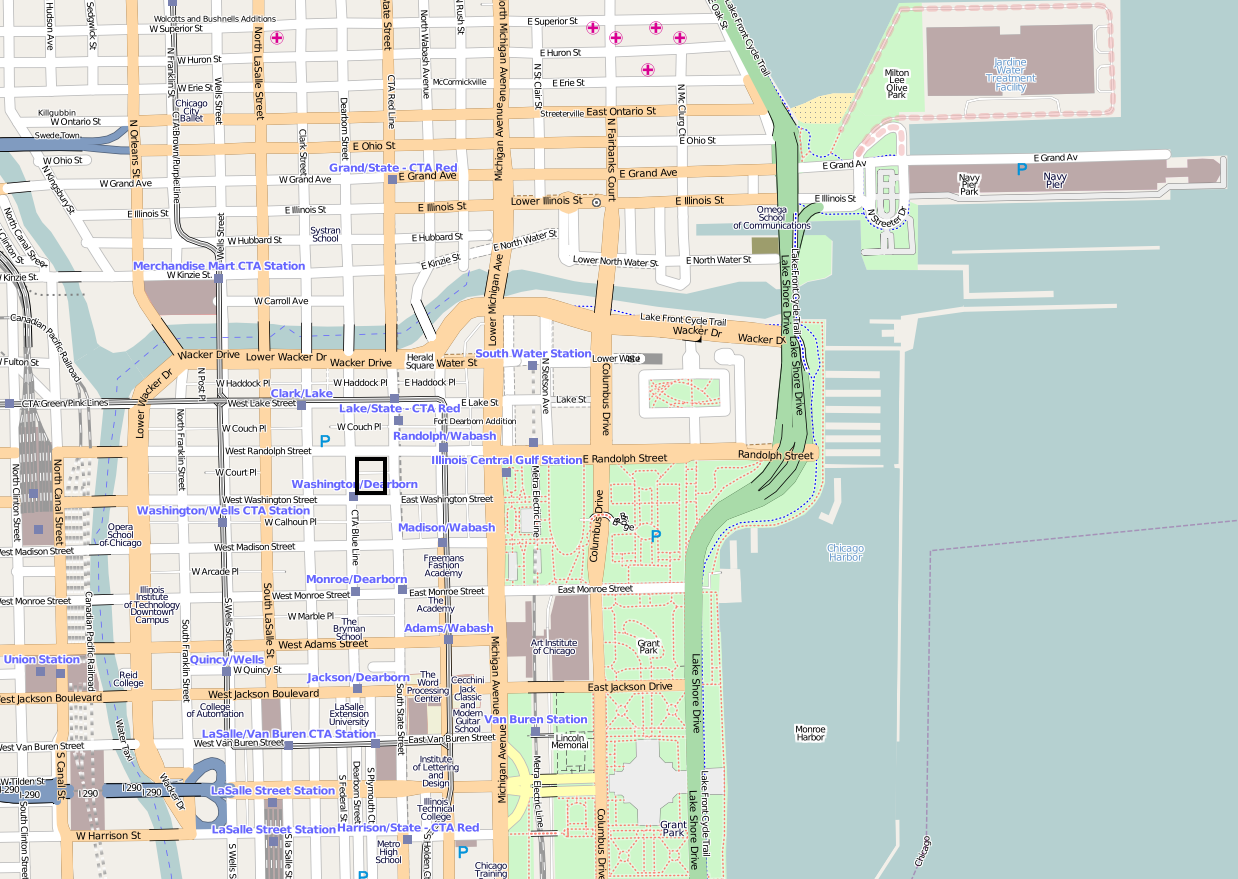
- 108 North State Street viewed from southeast (near Washington & State) March 15, 2008 Street map with the block depicted by black rectangle
- Location: Chicago, Illinois; United States
- Coordinates: 41.883932°N 87.628841°W
- Address: 108 North State Street
- Opened: Commercial (July 2008); Retail (November 2009); Residential (June 2016)
- Developer: The Mills Corporation (2002–2007); Joseph Freed and Associates LLC (2007–2016)
- Owner: Bank of America (tentative sale to CIM Group in February 2012)
- Floors: CBS Broadcast Center (22 West Washington) – 17; Mall – 3 Apartment – 34
- Public transit: Chicago "L": Blue Line at Washington Red Line at Lake Green Line Brown Line Orange Line Pink Line Purple Line at Washington/Wabash
- Website: blockthirtyseven.com

108 North State Street, often referred to as Block 37, is a shopping mall and development situated in the Loop area of downtown Chicago, Illinois. This site is defined by the square block bordered by West Randolph Street, North State Street, West Washington Street, and North Dearborn Street, originally designated as one of the city's 58 blocks. While the above-ground redevelopment has been finished, construction on an underground station was halted, leaving it only partially completed.

The previous buildings on the block were demolished in 1989 for a hotly contested redevelopment plan under the then Chicago Mayor Richard M. Daley. The debates included the demolition of the Chicago Landmark McCarthy Building, which proceeded after the Illinois Supreme Court decided private preservation groups did not have standing to challenge the city's decision.

After the site was cleared, the original redevelopment plan collapsed, along with several others that followed. The Mills Corporation began construction in 2005, but its previous financial struggles cast a shadow over the project. This troubled history, coupled with a shifting economic landscape, led to delays in 2006 as contractors hesitated, fearing they might not be compensated. By November 2009, the developer was declared in default, prompting CB Richard Ellis to step in as receiver. The project was then taken over by Joseph Freed and Associates LLC, but in 2011, Bank of America foreclosed on the property, ultimately selling it to CIM Group in 2012. The three new buildings were finally completed by 2016.

== Site ==
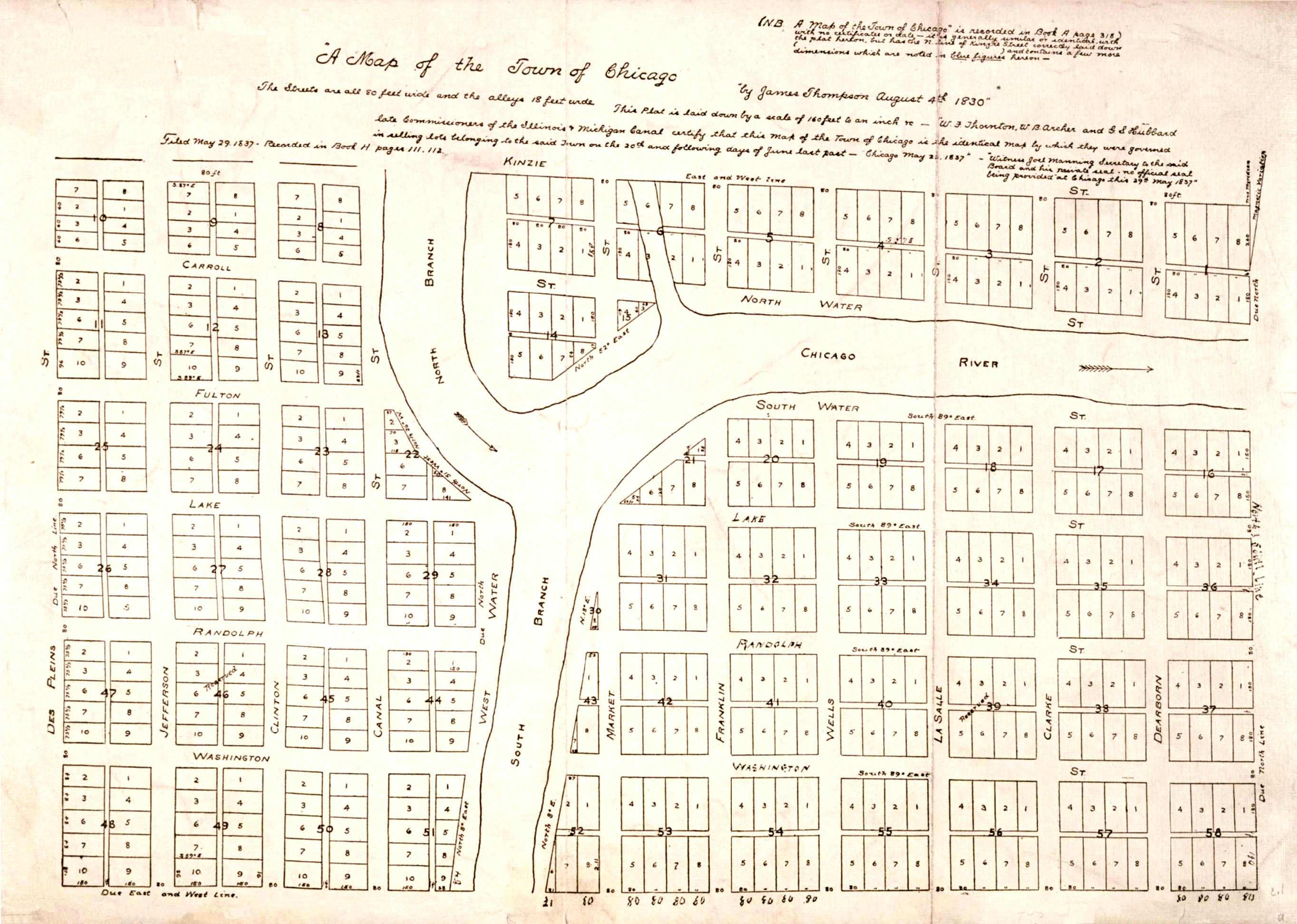
Thompson's original 1830 58-block plat of Chicago, including "Block 37"

In 1829, the legislature appointed commissioners to locate a canal and layout the surrounding town. The commissioners employed James Thompson to survey and plat the town of Chicago, which at the time had a population of less than 100. Historians regard the August 4, 1830, filing of the plat as the official recognition of a municipality known as Chicago. Block 37 is one of the city's original 58 blocks in the layout of the town. Due to Block 37's central location in the Loop, between the State Street retail district, the city/county government complex, and the Randolph Street theater district, its history is a microcosm of the city's history.

Even before the Chicago Fire, the block was home to one of Chicago's largest theaters. During the late 19th century, tall office buildings proliferated on the block. By 1970, the block was densely developed with 11 buildings, housing theaters, offices, a YMCA, and retailers like grocery store Stop & Shop. On June 14, 1973, Mayor Richard J. Daley announced a broad urban renewal initiative centered on the North Loop theater district. Over the ensuing 16 years, numerous private developers, notably the Rubloff Company and JMB Realty, planned large mixed-use developments on the site, with a mall along State Street and hotels and office towers above. Property assembly was facilitated by Mayor Harold Washington's creation of the North Loop tax increment financing district in 1983, which gave the urban renewal effort a steady revenue stream and eminent domain authority.

The modern-day Block 37 is flanked to the west by the Richard J. Daley Center and to the east by the former Marshall Field and Company Building. It is part of the central business district that includes Chicago City Hall and the James R. Thompson Center (the State of Illinois office building) within 2 blocks.

== Design ==
=== Buildings ===
According to original plans, the complex was to be composed of three united structures: a 21-story residential condominium tower called 108 North State Condominium Tower at North State Street and West Randolph Street; a 20-story hotel tower called 108 North State Hotel Tower at West Randolph Street and North Dearborn Street; and a 17-story tower called CBS Broadcast Center at North State Street and West Washington Street (for WBBM-TV, CBS 2). At one point, there was talk that the hotel tower has been abandoned in favor of a second residential tower, though later plans indicated that the hotel tower was still anticipated. These structures rise above lower level retail space, with an eclectic mix of shopping, entertainment, and dining in its lower retail floors. In November 2008, the city proposed financing to enable Loews Hotels to build a 354-room hotel.

Architecturally, the main floor features transparent cornered project facades and clear glass street level views. The multiple structures feature approximately 400,000 square feet (37,000 m^{2}) of retail, entertainment and dining space, and 200,000 to 450,000 square feet (19,000 to 42,000 m^{2}) of office space. The 38-story Marquee at Block 37, also known as 25 West Randolph Street, was completed in 2016 with 690 residential units.

=== Transit facilities ===
The design that broke ground in 2005, included a superstation that would connect the tracks of and serve passengers on both the CTA Blue Line and CTA Red Line, enabling direct transfers. The planned project included a downtown station for train service to both Chicago airports: O'Hare and Midway.

The cost of the station was estimated at $213 million. The City of Chicago and the Chicago Transit Authority were to pay $172 million, and the Mills Corporation (the initial developer) was to pay for the rest. Cost overruns and delays forced the city of Chicago and the Chicago Transit Authority to pay about $100 million to cover already-incurred costs, and the CTA canceled the project, partly because it did not have the estimated $1.5 billion that would be needed to create express airport service (as opposed to slow local train service using existing tracks and stations). In the end, about $400 million was spent on construction on the shell of a station, plus $40 million in mothballing costs.

In November 2009, progress in construction of the commercial and residential buildings allowed the Block 37 portion of the Chicago Pedway to open between the Lake station on the Red Line and the Washington station on the Blue Line. Because this only connected the unpaid areas of the stations, farecard holders paid the standard $0.25 transfer fare to use this connection. In May 2013, the CTA made this transfer free.

After the failure of the superstation project, the city began investigating the possibility of a privately constructed airport express service using Block 37 as the downtown endpoint. The city announced in June 2018, that The Boring Company had won a contest to negotiate a contract to construct a high-speed rapid transit link to O'Hare, dubbed Chicago Express Loop, using twin tunnels and electric vehicles based on the Tesla Model X. Funding for construction and operation would be provided completely by the company, and the system would reduce travel time to O'Hare to about 12 minutes.

== History ==
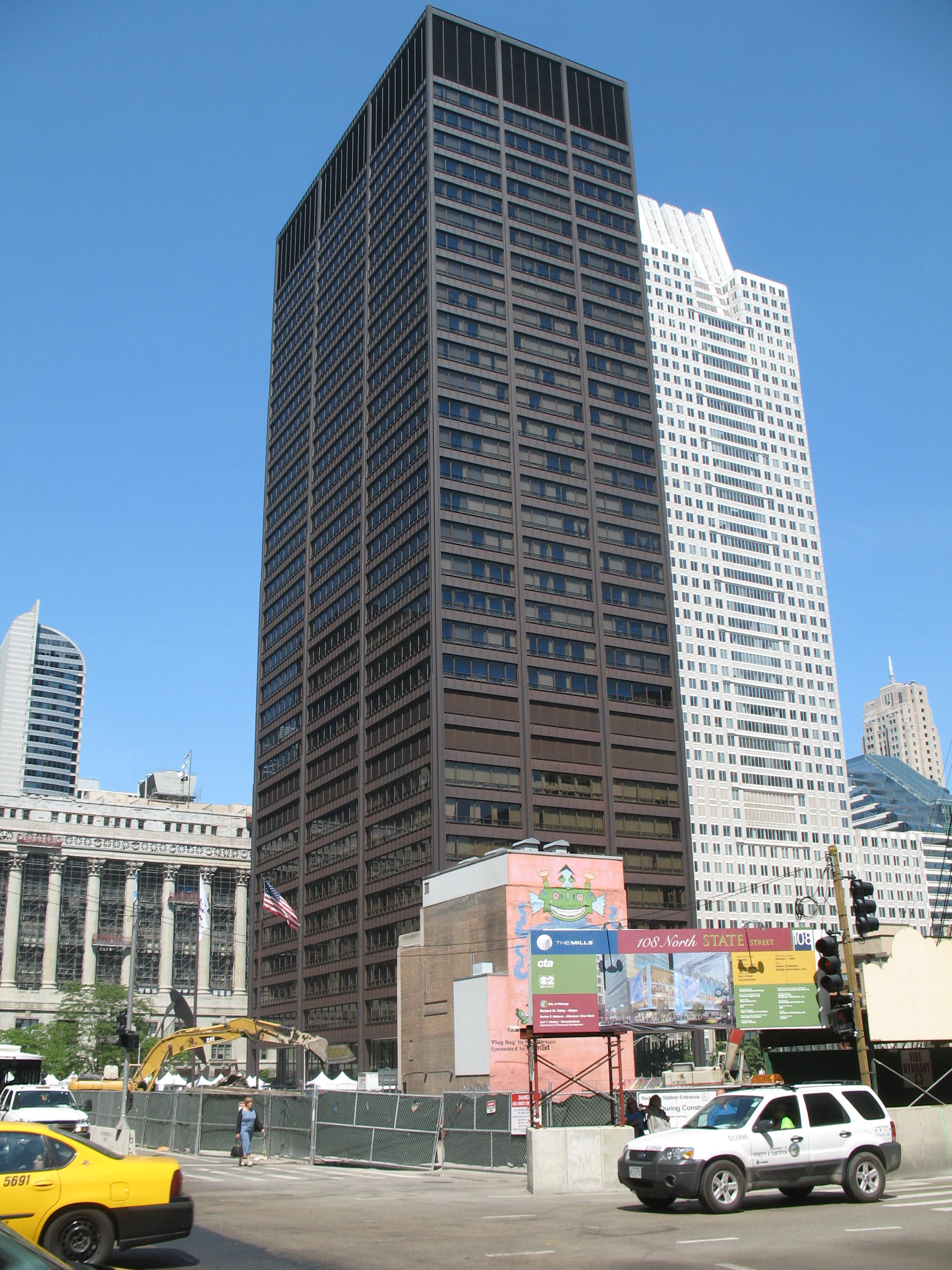
June 8, 2006, Block 37 site and signage. (In background left to right: Chicago City Hall, Richard J. Daley Center, Grant Thornton Tower and James R. Thompson Center)

=== Block 37 ===
Block 37 was demolished in 1989, after Mayor Richard M. Daley approved its demolition to erect a multi-use skyscraper with retail, hotel, office, and residential spaces. This prompted much public consternation; the McCarthy Building, a Chicago Landmark, was even stripped of landmark status over the objection of preservationists and public interest groups in order for the block to be cleared. Block 37 was a nearly vacant city block from 1989 until 2005 after several attempts at redevelopment failed due to Chicago politics and insufficient funding of several past developers. The single remaining building from the pre-1989 Block 37 architecture is an active Commonwealth Edison transformer building that distributes power to a great portion of the Loop.

Maggie Daley's nonprofit, After School Matters, started as Gallery37 in the summer of 1991, where the organization set up tents to provide visual arts classes to teenagers. The organization moved from Block 37 when development began, and now operates in a nearby building named "Gallery 37 Center for the Arts" on Randolph Street, a few blocks east of its original home.

In 1987, Chicago Mayor Harold Washington approved a $24 million subsidy to FJV Venture to develop Block 37. There were a series of subsequent alternate redevelopment plans. Among the prior redevelopment plans for the block were the original Block 37 Towers, for which the original block was demolished and which included a 47-story tower designed by Murphy/Jahn, Inc. Another failed plan was a Solomon Cordwell Buenz plan including a 711-foot 66-story residential tower and a 12-story Marriott Hotel towering over a 4-story retail base. This had followed the 39-story Kohn Pedersen Fox Associates design scheduled for 2004 completion. The developments fell through, which put the property back into the city's possession. In 2002, the city initiated a competition for the development rights to the property. In 2004, the city sold the property to Mills Corp. at a $20 million loss. Mills sold the development rights to Joseph Freed and Associates in 2005, when the city committed $42 million in tax-increment funding. In 2007, the city learned the development was $150 million over budget. The complex was originally being developed by the Arlington, Virginia-based commercial real estate developer, The Mills Corporation, best known for its ownership of numerous super-regional shopping malls. However, Joseph Freed and Associates LLC has inherited the development rights.

=== The Mills Corporation ===
==== Corporate difficulties ====
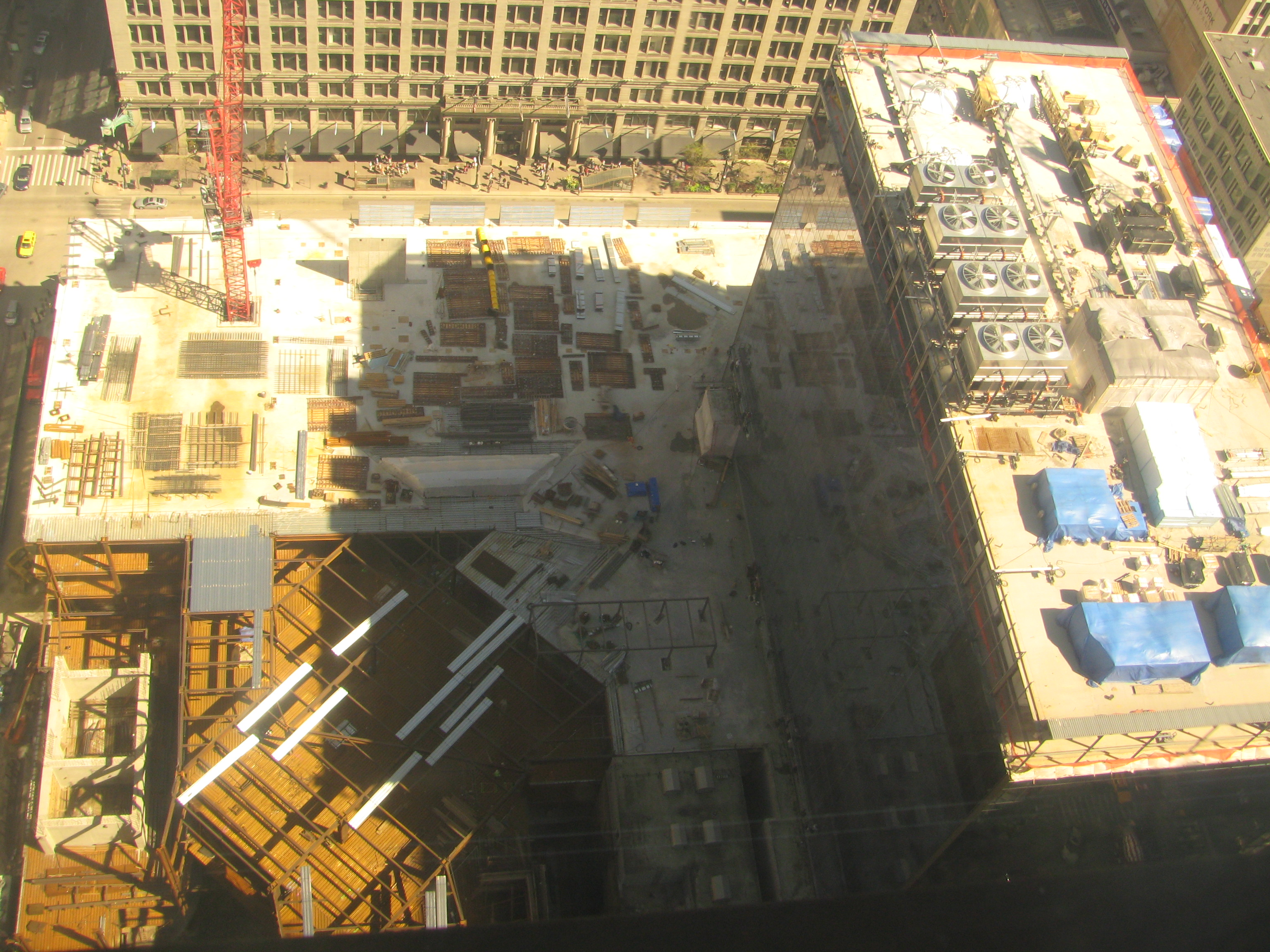
September 14, 2007, view from Daley Center

Mills' troubles began in November 2005, with revelations of large losses on failed projects, a cash crunch and a U.S. Securities and Exchange Commission investigation into its accounting. The SEC inquiry was upgraded to a formal investigation in March 2006. The reclassification as a formal investigation allows for the use of additional techniques such as subpoenas. On April 6, 2007, Simon Property Group, Inc. announced the joint acquisition of the Mills Corporation along with Farallon Capital Management for $25.25 per share of common stock.

==== Block 37 troubles ====
In March 2006, contractors halted construction because of fears that they would not be paid. This caused Morningstar to reconsider their lease commitment. As a result, the value of the project declined, which made the resale of the project rights difficult. Mills was close to a deal with German investment firm, Deutsche Immobilien Fonds A.G. prior to the difficulties. DIFA had outbid Chicago developer Golub & Co., which then became the frontrunner. Golub, an international real estate investment company headquartered in Chicago, has closed on the office space portion of the project. Mills eventually sold the retail space rights to Chicago developer Joseph Freed & Associates, who had previously purchased the nearby Carson, Pirie, Scott and Company Building (located at 1 South State Street) that closed in early 2007.

By 2007, Golub and Mills were in a legal entanglement over certain leases to Morningstar for 211,000 square feet (19,600 m^{2}). Golub claimed Mills knew the measurements of the floors actually totalled 237,000 square feet (22,000 m^{2}) although they contracted for 211,000 square feet (19,600 m^{2}). Golub claimed a Morningstar affiliate "...induced Morningstar to agree in the lease to be bound by an after-the-fact re-measurement of the space." Additionally, Golub claimed that Mills has acted without Daley administration authorizations for plans such as elimination of a proposed hotel in favor of a second apartment tower, as required by an agreement between Golub and Mills. In addition, Golub had sued over the residential portion of the project, which was given to Freed. Golub claimed to have accepted the office space part of the project at a low profit with the expectation of making a larger profit on the residential portion. The subsequent court ruling allowed Mills to terminate its contract with Golub to develop the project's two residential towers and to sell the residential portion of the Block 37 project in the Loop to developer Joseph A. Freed & Associates LLC.

==== 2009 foreclosure ====
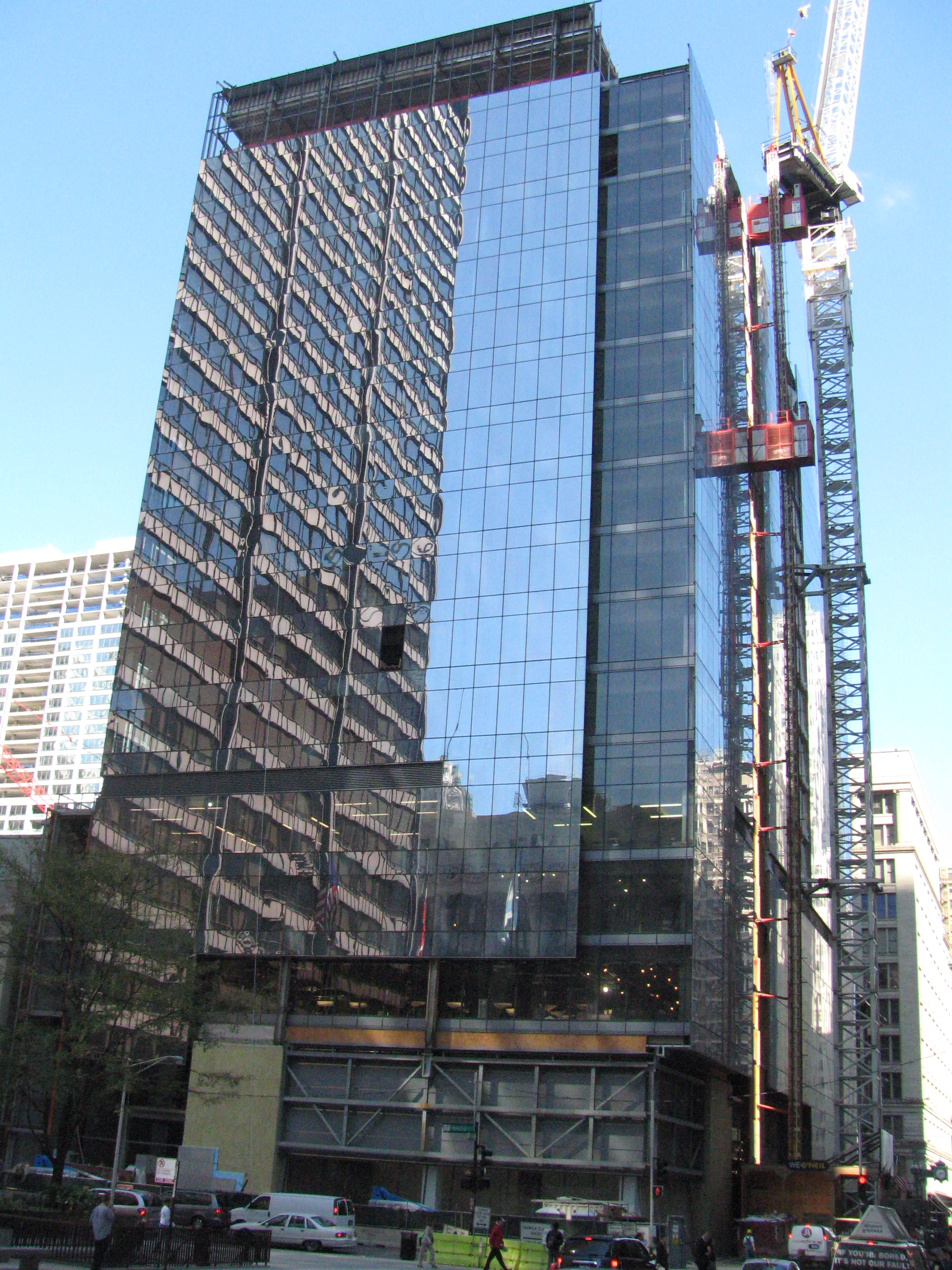
The first of the three structures is at 22 West Washington

Lenders, including Bank of America, moved to foreclose on the retail and transit portion of the mixed-use development on October 19, 2009, because Joseph Freed and Associates ran out of money. Freed technically defaulted in March. With cost overruns exceeding $34 million as of August 25, Freed owed $128.5 million on a $205 million construction loan, according to a lawsuit filed in Cook County Circuit Court.

On November 3, the developer announced it had landed 13 new tenants to open within the succeeding few months. On November 20, a circuit court judge stripped Freed of the development rights and turn the responsibility over to CB Richard Ellis. On the same day, a partial occupancy permit for the underground pedway connecting the Red Line and Blue Line as well as first floor retail space was granted. Freed claimed that the loan payments were current, and the default was based on a technicality. Freed was found personally liable for $6.8 million of the cost on December 30, 2009.

As receiver, CB Richard Ellis was scheduled to file a status report with the court December 8, and a full report, including financials, on January 15, 2010. Disputes over insurance delayed the handover of development rights, which finally happened in late January 2010. In March 2011, Bank of America acquired the $206 million property with a credit bid of $100 million at a sheriff's foreclosure sale. Then in February 2012, CIM Group was expected to close on a negotiated purchase of the entire 305,000-square-foot shopping center from Bank of America Corp. CIM did not actually close on the purchase until April 2012.

== Progress ==
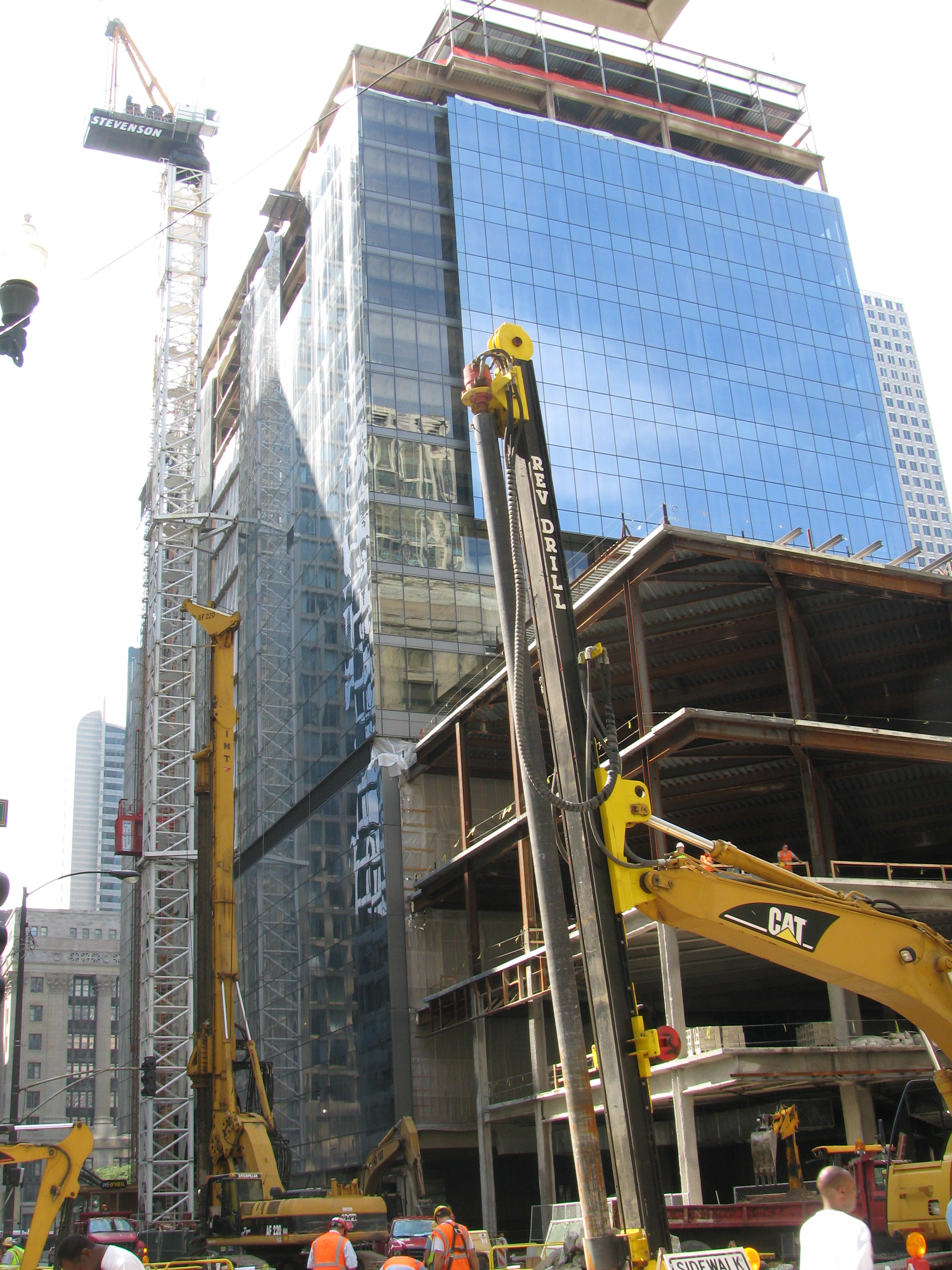
22 West Washington is the first of the three buildings. (photo August 25, 2007)

=== Phase I construction ===
The Mills Corporation purchased the property for the project from the city on November 11, 2005. Phase I of the project, the groundbreaking, began formally on November 15, 2005. This followed winning the competition to be master developer and having their plan approved by the city. The Mills Corporation has letters of intent from CBS 2 Chicago Broadcast Center, Boggi Milano, Sisley, Andrew's Ties, Banana Republic, Rosa Mexicano, David Barton Gym and new concepts by Steve Lombardo, creator of Gibson's Steakhouse and Hugo's Frog Bar, and Steven Foster, creator of Lucky Strike Lanes in Hollywood as future tenant commitments. Morningstar, Inc. has signed a lease to occupy about 210,000 square feet (20,000 m^{2}) across eight floors, making it the largest tenant in the office tower. In April 2005, Mills had announced a lease commitment with WBBM-Channel 2 for about 100,000 square feet (10,000 m^{2}) of space for offices and a showcase television studio. In February 2008, developer Joseph Freed & Associates announced Club Monaco, a Muvico Entertainment LLC theatre, a David Barton Gym, a Rosa Mexican restaurant, a coffee shop and a yet-to-be-named Lettuce Entertain You Enterprises Inc. restaurant will be located in the State Street complex. In June 2008, Puma confirmed it is opening a two-level flagship store on Block 37. Also, the Muvico Theatre was reported to have an eight screen multiplex. In October 2008, Spanish clothing store Zara signed a lease for Block 37 along with German athletic-wear company Puma athletic wear and British clothing label Ben Sherman. Other confirmed retailers include clothier Steve Madden, Godiva Chocolatier, sporting apparel seller Lululemon Athletica Inc., hair and skin products retailer Aveda as well as body and bath products retailer Sabon. Other stores rumored to be considering Block 37 at that time were Apple Computer and Crate & Barrel home furnishings

=== Phase II construction ===
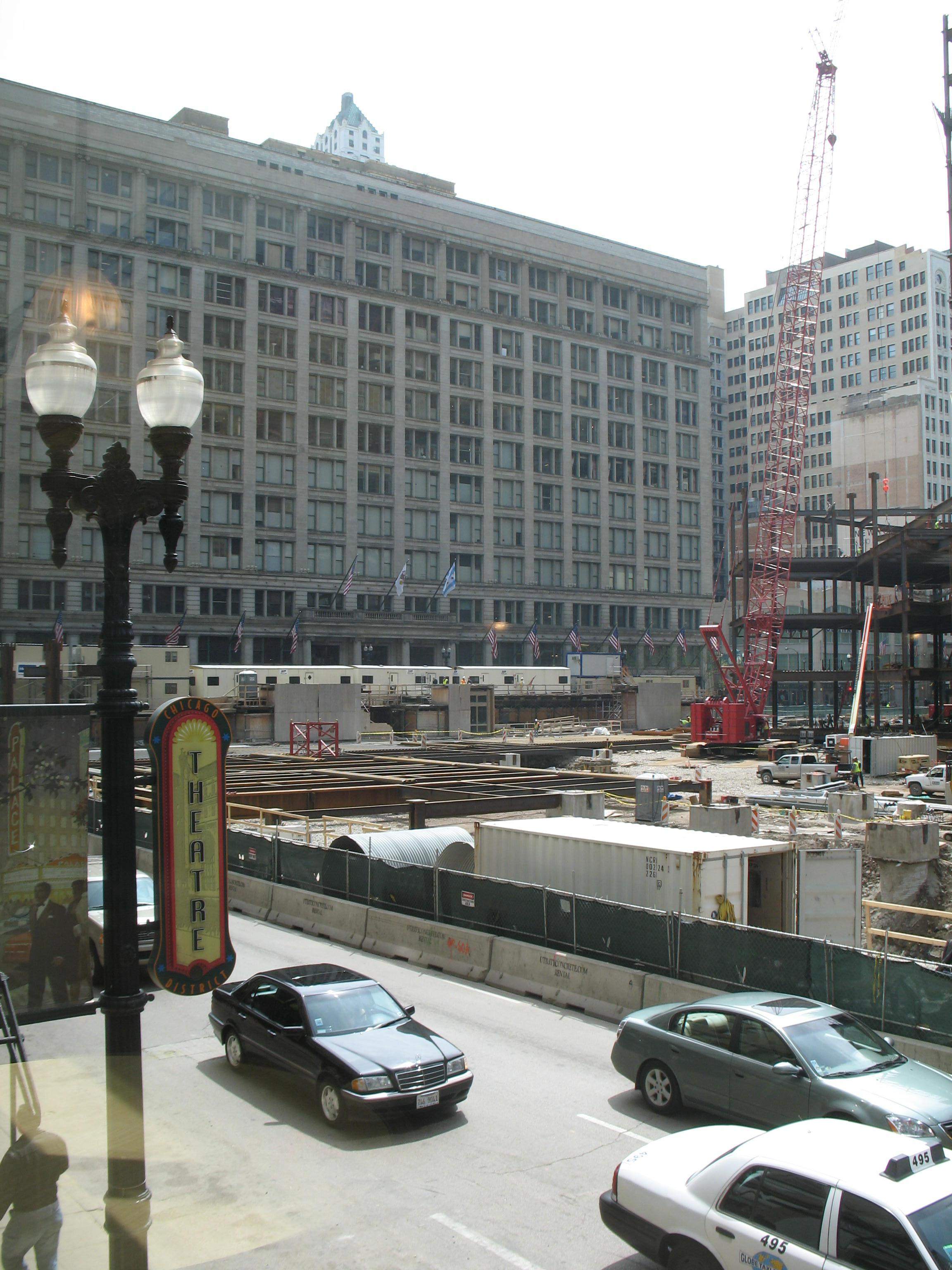
Base construction beginnings on May 2, 2007

On July 31, 2006, the retail and CTA construction began. The retail portion entails the construction of the CBS 2 Broadcast Center building at North State Street and West Washington Street. The building will also serve as the corporate headquarters of Morningstar, Inc. This 17-story building will be 276 feet (84 m) in height. After a series of previous failures on this project, this marks the first time redevelopment has gone past ground breaking to the construction phase.

The first phase of construction (Phase II) had been contracted to be completed by March 2008. This would enable Morningstar, Inc. to move before its early 2009 lease expiration at its location on 225 W. Wacker Drive. However, financial troubles caused delays that necessitated Morningstar—who had intended to occupy over half of the building—seek lease proposals from other downtown office towers. Morningstar would have suffered holdover penalties and other damages if it were unable to move before its lease expires. Morningstar was hesitant to pursue other opportunities because their lease at 108 North State Street was at a below market price in the low $20s/square foot.

On June 11, 2008, the CTA board was scheduled to hear the city's plan of a three-phase bailout of the construction of the rapid transit station under the Block 37 mall. The plan included $20 million in additional tax increment financing. This comes on top of an extra $60–70 million in excess of its budgeted amount that the CTA had been forced to expend. The building developer, Joseph Freed & Associates, has agreed to accept $19 million of cost overruns. This round of assistance only covers costs that have been incurred to date. No further funds have been committed and the station's development is being halted until such funds arise. The original budget was $213 million ($173 million from CTA) and the costs-to-date had been $320 million. The costs had run $150 million over budget at that time, and the city was seeking private investment. Construction finally began on the third building, the hotel and residences in the end of 2009.

==== You Are Beautiful ====
During construction, 100 local artists created cutout woodblock letters to place on the temporary construction wall. They were posted on the wall adjacent to the temporary pedestrian walkway next to the construction site. The phrase "You Are Beautiful" was spelled out in various languages.

=== Completion ===
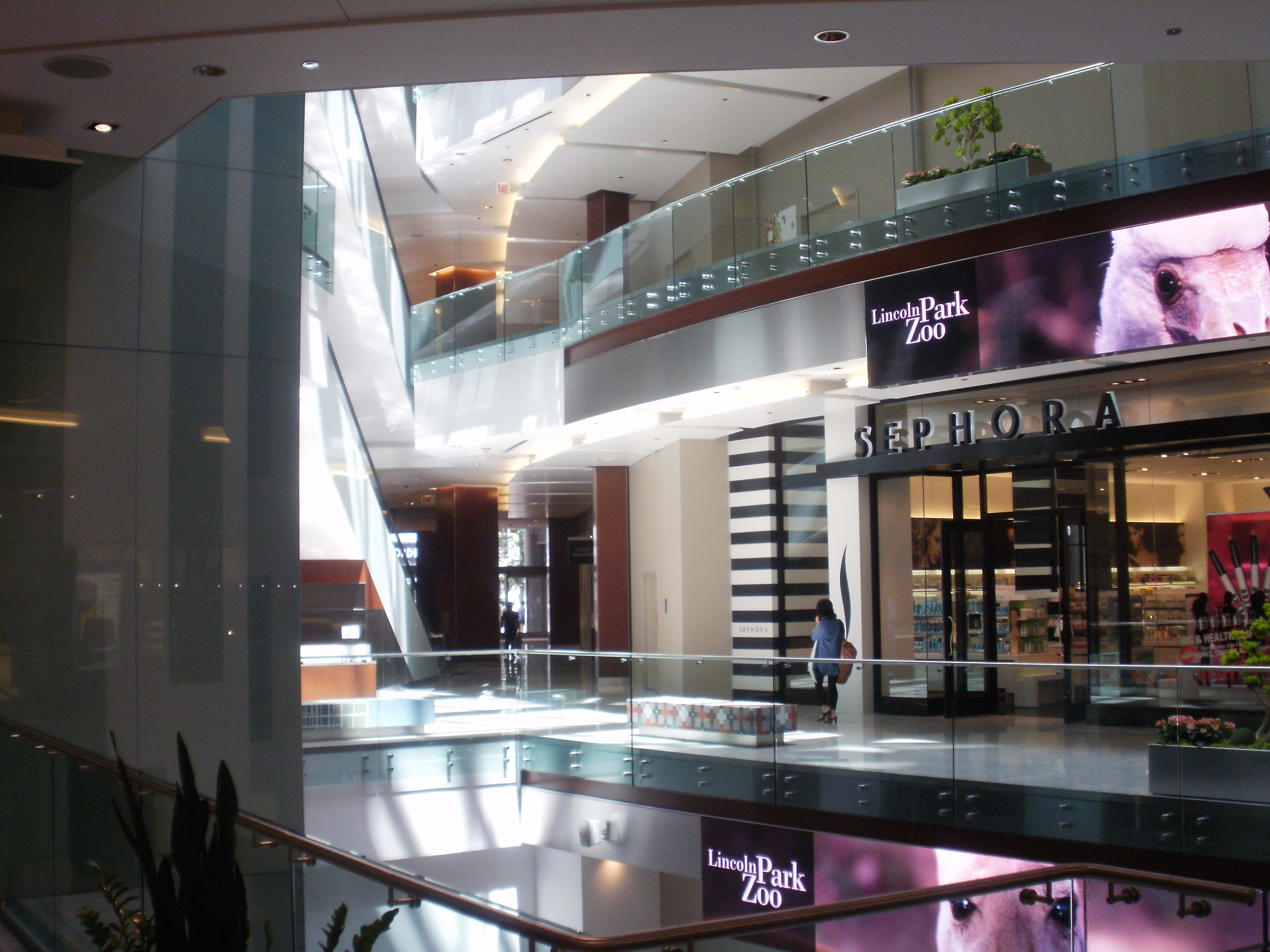
View from the Southwest, the 1st Floor of the building

In September 2008, the mixed-use 16-story building held its ribbon cutting ceremony. The CBS studio includes a 30 by 19 feet (9.1 by 5.8 m) outside video display. Morningstar moved its global headquarters into the building. The structure also had the world's first luxury coworking space, with 100 individual workspaces for rent on the 15th floor in a space that includes a spa, pool hall, recording studio, graphic design shop, audio-visual board room, penthouse suites and concierge.

The shopping center includes Bebe, Coach and J.Crew. Lettuce Entertain You, who also operates the food court at Water Tower Place, operates a cafe, food court and market. The top floor was to be occupied by Muvico Theaters, who pulled out in 2009. The David Barton Gym, the first and largest tenant of the Block 37 project, also withdrew from the project. The reason the gym opted out was the delayed opening of the mall, which is scheduled for fall 2009 opening rather than fall 2008 as scheduled. In March 2009, Apple Inc. also withdrew from its leasing agreement, and less than a month later it signed an agreement to develop a new storefront in the Clybourn Corridor on property bounded by North Avenue, Halsted Street and Clybourn Avenue. After Apple backed out of its lease, Lululemon backed out of its lease to be located next to Apple. Other March 2009 tenant signings included Chicago's haberdashery Bigsby & Kruthers, Sunglass Hut, crystal jewelers Swarovski, Starfruit Cafe, and Fast-casual eatery Tahini. Also, in the face of declining advertising revenue, CBS sought to sublease part of its studio.

On November 20, 2009, the underground pedway connecting the Blue Line and the Red Line opened. The following day Steve Madden shoes, opened the first retail establishment in the structure. As of February 2012, the theatre, food court and gym had not opened and were no longer planned. The building remained only 26 percent occupied at that time due to hesitance by retailers to commit to leases while lender Bank of America and developer Joseph Freed battled in bankruptcy court.

=== Apartment building ===
In 2014, CIM began moving forward with adding a rental residential tower atop Block 37. In March 2014, rumors began that an apartment building exceeding 500 units was being planned. On September 11, CIM issued a press release that it had obtained permits for a 34-story, 690-unit apartment tower, which Crain's Chicago Business described as "the biggest apartment tower the Loop has seen in decades". The official commencement of the glass-walled project was on October 29 with expected completion by Summer 2016 to include amenities such as outdoor pool and spa, plus a rooftop spa and fitness center. At the time the retail spaces were only 52 percent occupied. The apartment building construction eliminated the plans to build a hotel atop the structure. The apartment building construction coincided with plans to bring an 11-screen AMC Theatres dine-in movie theater to the building. The 4th floor AMC theater opened its doors on December 17, 2015, as scheduled as the Loop's only major chain movie theatre. The theatre is Chicago's first Dine-In Theatre in which patrons order food by the touch of a button from their seats.

On June 1, 2016, the 38-story, 690-unit Marquee at Block 37 opened at 25 West Randolph St., marking the conclusion of construction at Block 37. CIM and its partner in the project, Canadian firm Morguard, attempted to put the building for sale in 2017 at $414 million. After no one offered to buy 25 West Randolph St., the companies refinanced the building in late 2017 with a $225 million mortgage, of which $110 million was used to repay a $110 million loan that funded construction. The developers then placed the building for sale again in 2019 at a cost of $300 million. Morguard bought out CIM's stake in November 2019. Northwestern Mutual provided the $165 million loan for Morguard to buy out CIM's stake.

== Gallery ==
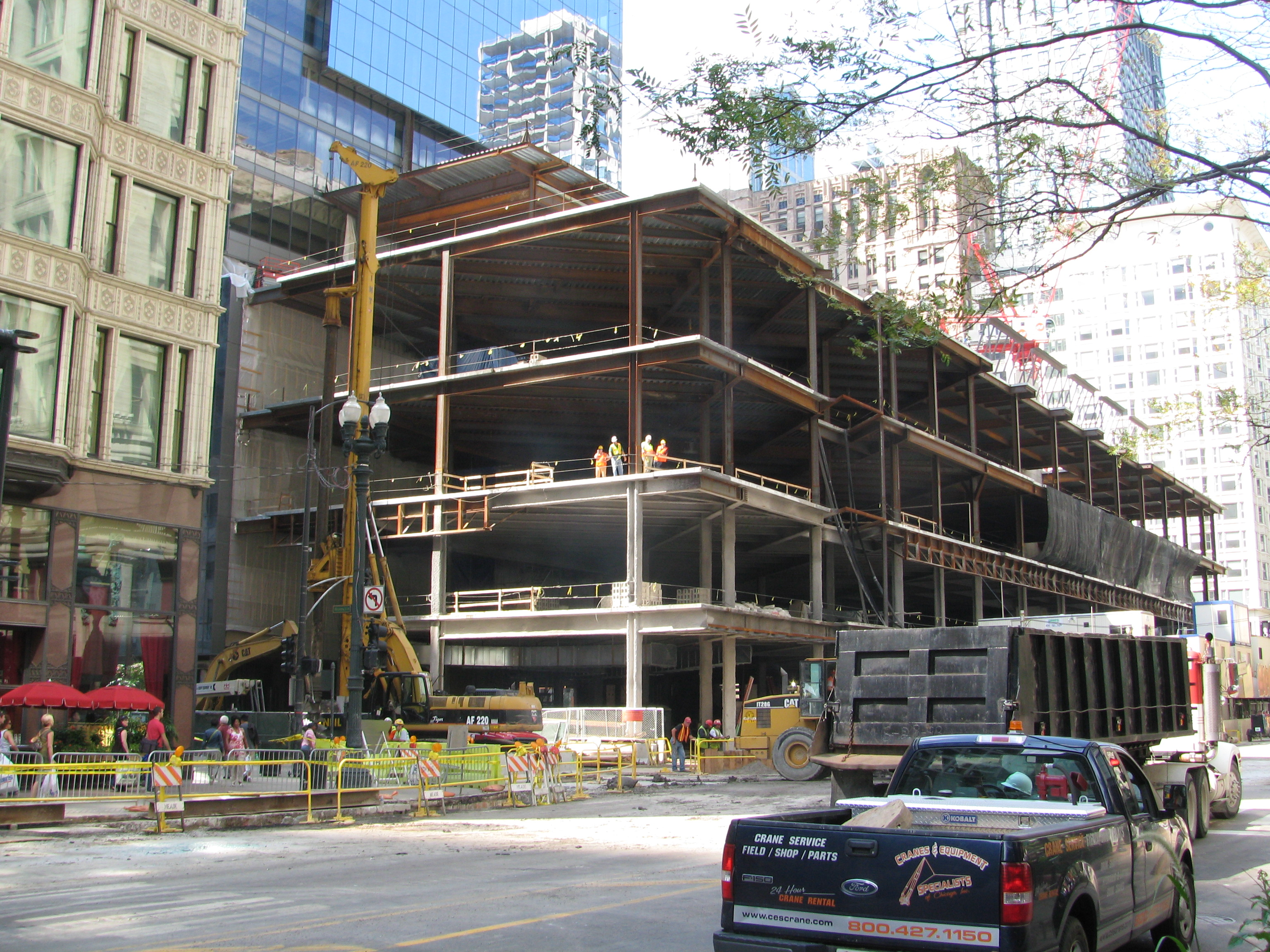
Viewed from the southeast corner (Washington & State) August 25, 2007

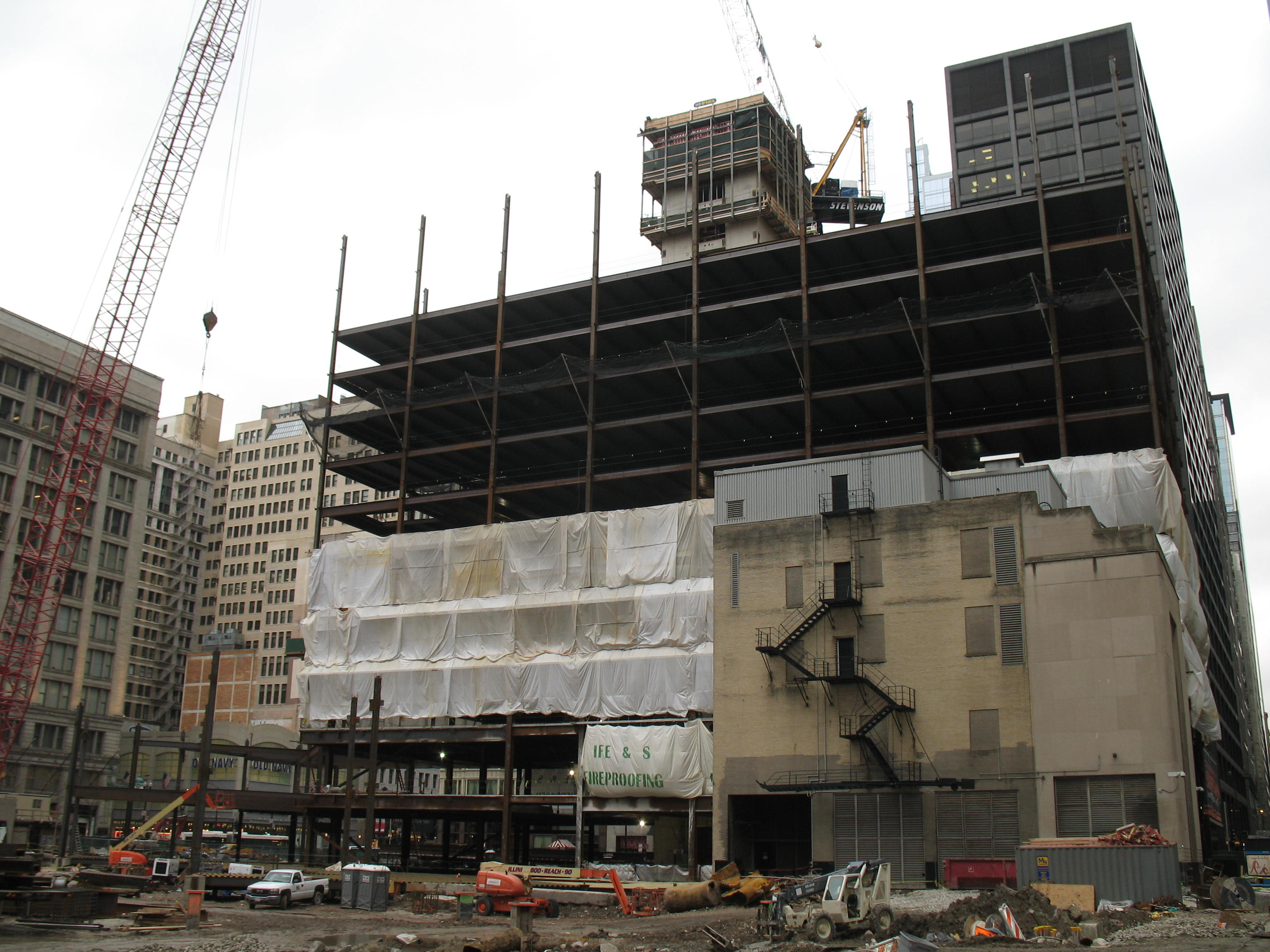
Viewed from the northwest corner (Dearborn & Randolph) April 12, 2007

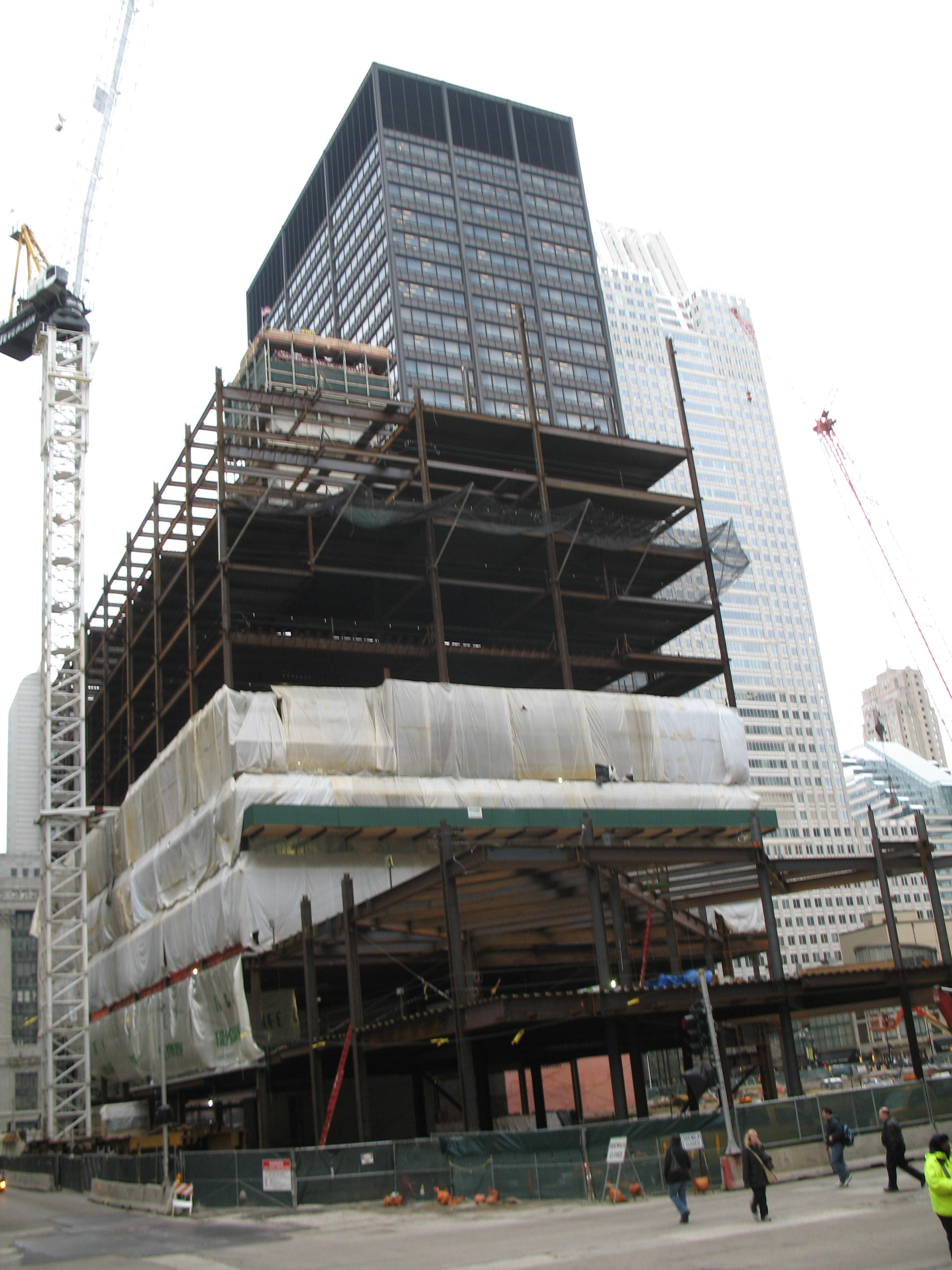
Viewed from the southeast corner (Washington & State) April 12, 2007

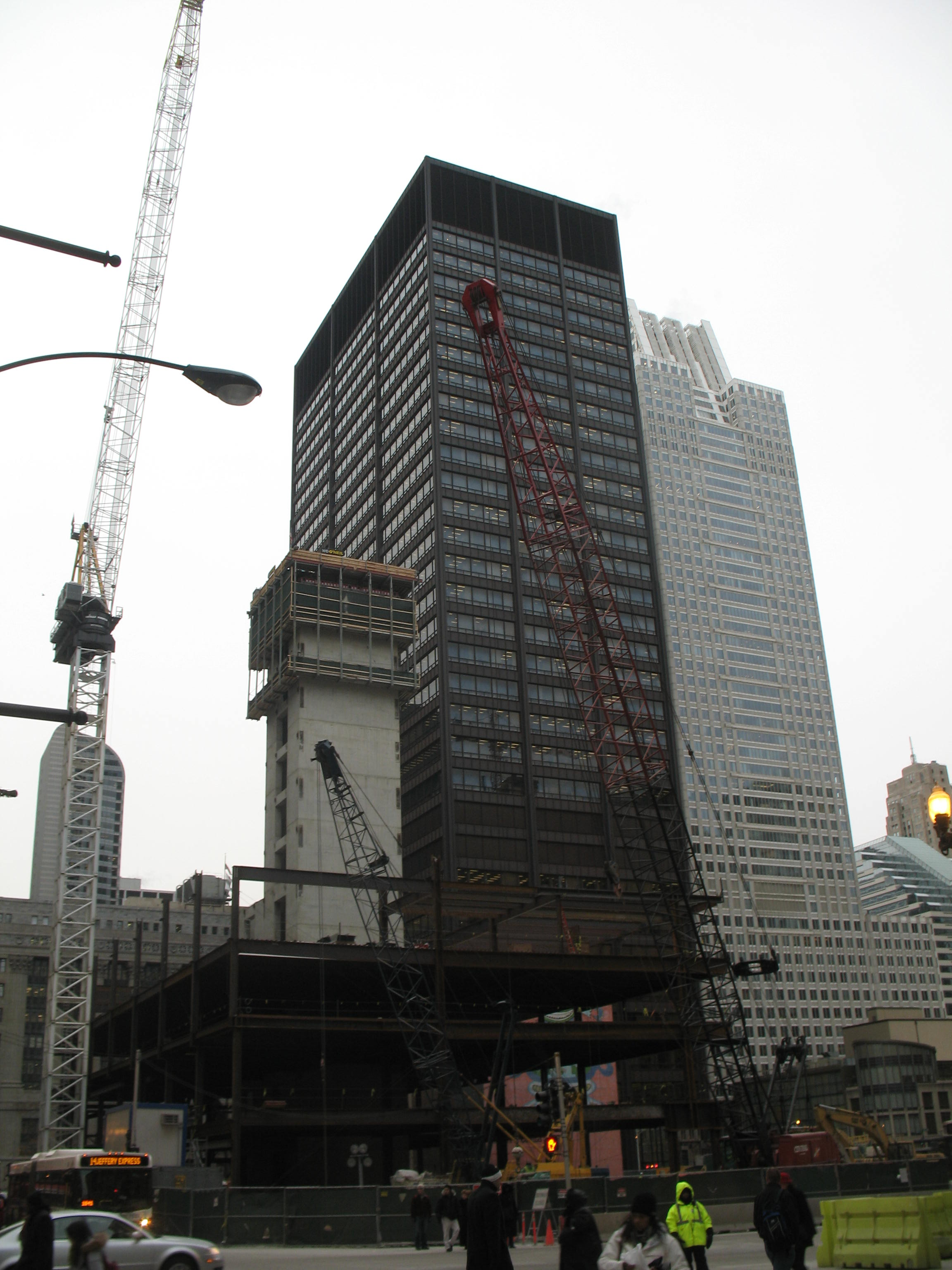
January 31, 2007
