= After School Matters =

U.S. non-profit organization

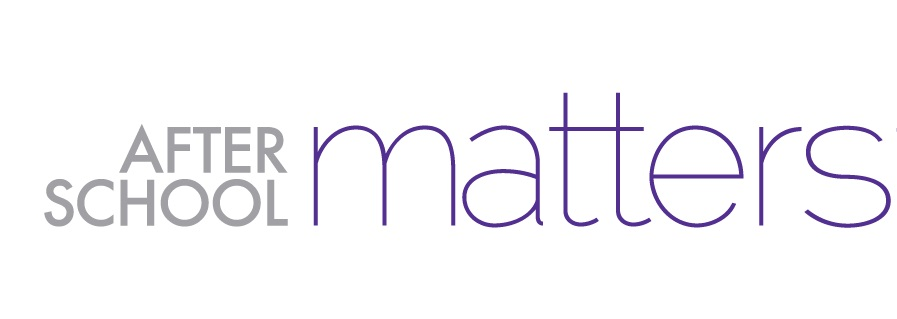
- Formation: 1991
- Type: Non-profit
- Legal status: 501(c)(3)
- Headquarters: 66 East Randolph St. Chicago, Illinois 60601; United States
- Region served: Chicago, IL
- CEO: Mary Ellen Caron
- Revenue: $25,503,279 (2016)
- Expenses: $27,820,318 (2016)
- Website: http://www.afterschoolmatters.org

After School Matters is a non-profit organization that provides Chicago high school teens with after-school and summer opportunities. It offers project-based after-school and summer programs in the arts, communications and leadership, sports and STEM (Science, Technology, Engineering and Math).

== History and background ==
After School Matters was originally founded by the former first lady of the City of Chicago, Maggie Daley, during her husband Richard M. Daley's term as mayor. Gallery 37 was the predecessor to the organization, which offered after school programs focusing primarily on the arts. In 2000, After School Matters was formed and began offering Chicago teenagers a wider range of programs, including programs from Gallery 37.

When the youth organization first launched as Gallery 37, 260 kids were enrolled that summer. Over 200,000 teenagers have been associated with or members of After School Matters since its launch.

Mellody Hobson has served as the president since 2012.

== Demographics ==
After School Matters works with the local Chicago adolescent population between the ages of 14 and 19 years old. Over 90% of its participants identify as ethnic minorities.

== Programs and partnerships ==
Programs are offered in forms of apprenticeships and internships that cover areas such as science, sports, technology, college readiness skills, and communication. Programs are offered in three sessions: Summer, Fall, and Spring.

The organization works with various organizations across Chicago and other corporate entities. Some include, West Town Bikes, Forward Momentum, 1871, The Chicago Fire Foundation, and Bank of America, who further provide teenagers with programs.

=== Art ===
Programs under the arts primarily fall under performing, visual and culinary arts. These include theater, graphic design, choir, catering, and printmaking.

- Students created a series of artworks that were added to the newly renovated McCormick Places Metra Station waiting room in 2017.
- J-DEF Peace Project, a mural located in the Pilsen neighborhood, was created by students in dedication to those who have lost their lives due to gang violence.
- In 2015, After School Matters teens helped create a mural promoting healthy eating at Whole Foods Market in Edgewater.
- A cooking exhibition was led by students at the 2013 Taste of Chicago.
- Students can also participate in programs offered through Forward Momentum where they can learn and perform different dance styles such as Ballet, Latin, African, and Hip-Hop.
- Students also created a mural at 2025 Lollapalooza.

=== Communications and leadership ===
Programs are offered in business, journalism, marketing, media, and social science. Some examples are documentary video, creative writing and debate.

After School Matters and the USC Shoah Foundation partnered to create a program called "iWitness", which teaches leadership skills and in understanding public political discourse. The students were also able to develop their own contributions to the political debate via social media.

=== Sports ===
Sports instruction, stadium management, health and wellness, and sports-related programs such as soccer and lifeguarding are offered via After School Matters.

A partnership with West Town Bikes allows for students to attend a program were they can learn about cycling, rules on the road, transportation, and even how to repair bikes. The program offers students the opportunity to build their own bikes as well as earn a stipend at the end of the program.

=== STEM (Science, Technology, Engineering and Mathematics) ===
Programs offered are applied and natural science, audio/visual technology, industrial technology, and information technology.

A partnership with 1871, a technology and entrepreneurship company, allows students to apply for internship positions at the company and work in event planning and community outreach.

== After School Matters Annual Gala ==
Every year After School Matters holds a gala to celebrate its members' accomplishments and collect funds to support its programs. This platform has been used as a showcase for many of the teenage members' work and contributions to the general public and outside contributors. In 2016 the program held its 25th annual gala at Navy Pier and raised a total of $4.5 million.

== Funding and notable donations ==
After School Matters sustains itself through grants and donations.

In 2013 a $25 million donation, given in $5 million increments, was made to the program by filmmaker George Lucas and Mellody Hobson through the George Lucas Foundation. The donation funded a $275 to $425 student stipend, which had been cut during the recession. In 2013 the City of Chicago invested $12.2 million in the program. Donations were also made by former Chicago Bulls players Michael Jordan and Derrick Rose, who donated $1 million in 2014.

== Controversies ==
Linda Wutton of WBEZ found that teenagers who were paid $5 an hour in 2009 would now make $1.10 due to pay cuts in the program despite an increase in After School Matter's budget. Students who were previously earning a $400 stipend for a program would be receiving $100 for the same program the following year. Board member, Avis Lavele, of After School Matters claimed that the cuts were made to focus on eliminating clubs and bringing in more beneficial programs without reducing the number of students involved with After School Matters.
