= K-Town Historic District =

Historic district in Illinois, United States

- U.S. National Register of Historic Places
- U.S. Historic district
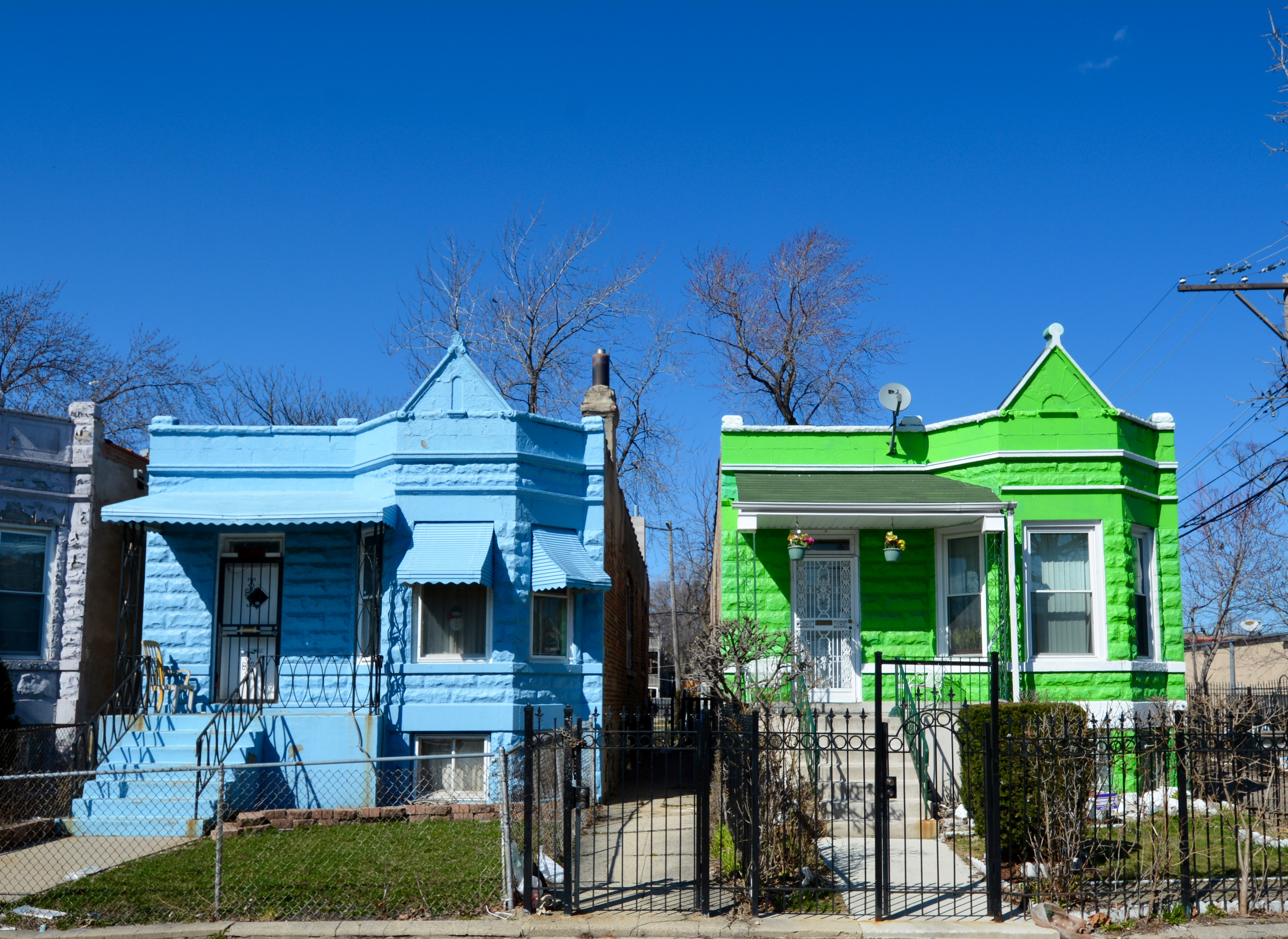
- 4014 and 4016 West Cullerton Street, two contributing properties to the K-Town Historic District.

- Location within Chicago metropolitan area Location within Illinois Location within the United States
- Coordinates: 41°51′11″N 87°43′47″W
- NRHP reference No.: 10000724
- Added to NRHP: September 9, 2010

The K-Town Historic District is a historic district listed on the National Register of Historic Places located in the North Lawndale community area in Chicago, Illinois. A mainly residential area, its borders are West Cullerton Street to the north, South Pulaski Road to the east, West Cermak Road to the south, and South Kostner Avenue to the west.

== History ==
The larger K-Town area received its name in 1889 when the City of Chicago created an alphabetical naming scheme to assist in mapping a significant amount of newly annexed territory. The streets with names starting with K were eleven miles from the state line between Illinois and Indiana. The larger K-Town area was originally settled by Czech immigrants to the United States at the beginning of the twentieth century. During the Great Migration the North Lawndale area, and subsequently K-Town, became predominantly African American.

The area was added to the NRHP in 2010.

== Architecture ==
Most buildings in the district were constructed between 1901 and 1931. The area is noted for its concentration of historic greystones and other early twentieth-century residences, which form a largely intact residential streetscape within North Lawndale.

== Transportation ==
The Pulaski and Kostner stations on Chicago Transit Authority's Pink Line are located in the K-Town Historic District.
