= James Patton =

James Patton may refer to:

- James Patton (Virginia colonist) (1692–1755) Irish immigrant who lived in colonial Virginia
- James French Patton (1843–1882), American soldier and judge
- Jimmy Patton (1933–1972), American football player
- Jim Patton (brewer) (1953–2012), American anthropologist and craft beer brewer
- James L. Patton (born 1941), American mammalogist
- James Patton (defensive lineman) (born 1970), American football player
- James Patton (American football coach), American football player and coach
- James Patton (baseball), American baseball player
- James Patton (Mississippi politician) (1780–1830), lieutenant governor of Mississippi
- James D. Patton (1850–1925), American politician in the Virginia House of Delegates
- James Patton (Canadian politician) (1824–1888), Canadian lawyer and politician

== See also ==
- James "Squire" Patton House, historic house in New Windsor, New York
- James Paton (disambiguation)
- James A. Patten (1852–1928), American financier and grain merchant
