= James Paton =

James Paton may refer to:

- James Paton (bishop) (1522–1596), Bishop of Dunkeld, Scotland
- James Paton (editor) of Hobart, Australia
- James Paton (museologist) (1843–1921), Scottish
- James Paton (seaman) (1869–1917/18), Scottish-born seaman who sailed to the Antarctic
- James Paton (Prince Edward Island politician) (1853–1953), Scottish-born merchant and political figure in Prince Edward Island
- James Paton (sport shooter) (born 1957), Canadian sport shooter
- James Alexander Paton (c. 1885–1946), newspaper owner and politician in British Columbia

== See also ==
- James Patton (disambiguation)
- James A. Patten (1852–1928), American financier and grain merchant
