= Louis Millet =

American educator and interior designer

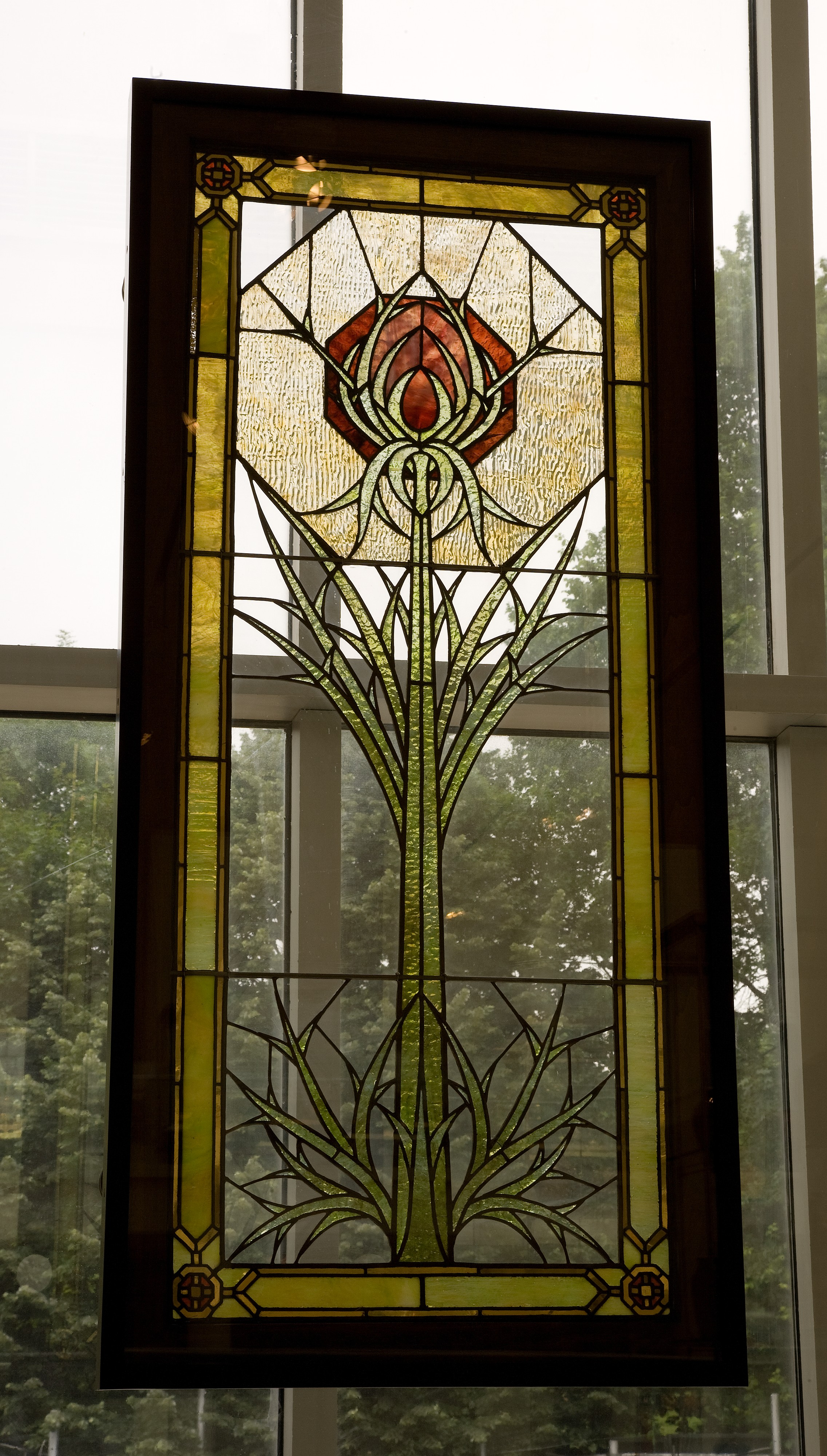
View through Louis J. Millet's thistle window originally from the Patrick J. King House and now at the James A. Patten House

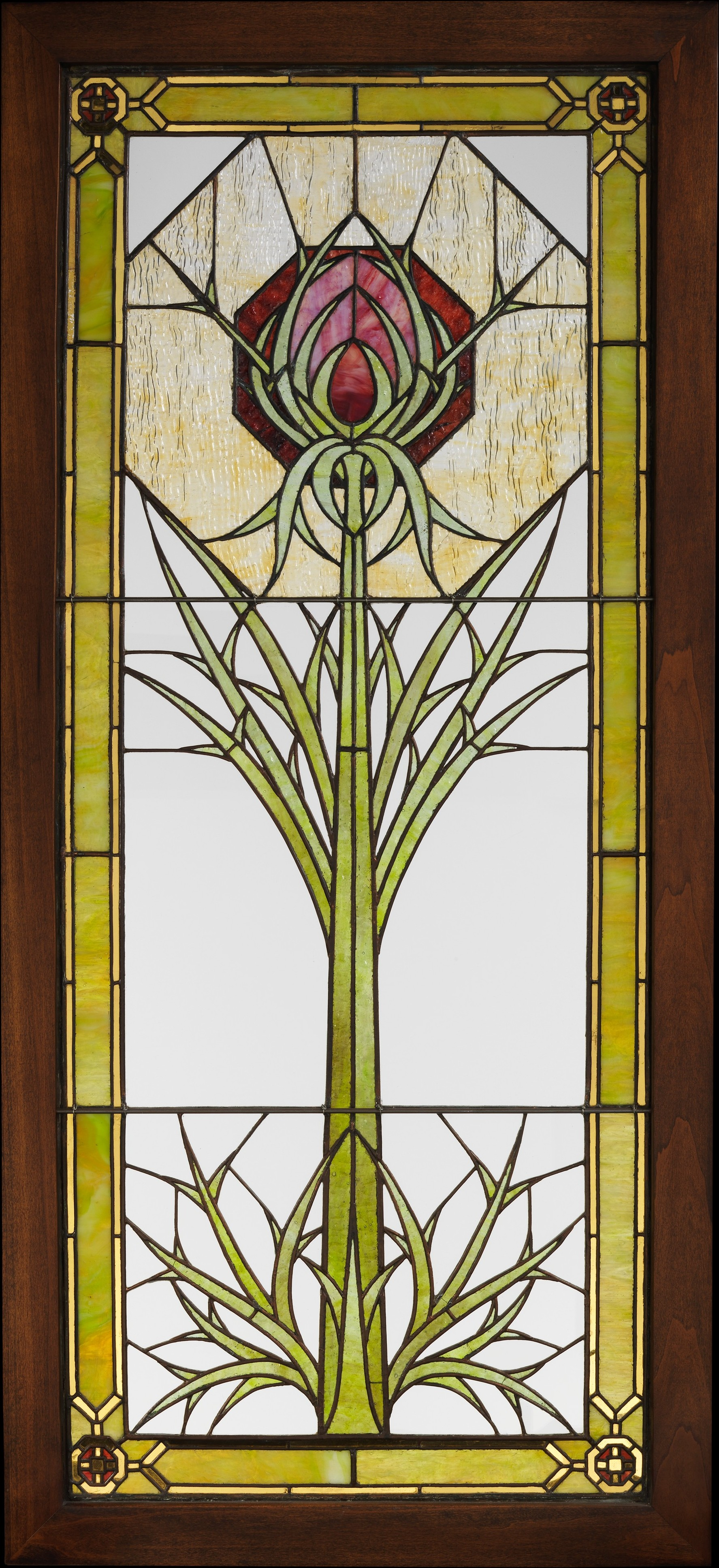
Louis J. Millet window at the James A. Patten House

Louis J. Millet (1856–1923) was an educator, industrial art school founder, and interior designer in the United States. He was a celebrated stained glass artist. He worked on Louis Sullivan and George W. Maher projects and went into business with portraitist George Healy at the interior design firm Healy & Millet offering services including interior decoration, floor tiling, and wood mantels. Millet was nationally known for his decorative work, frescoes, and stained glass.

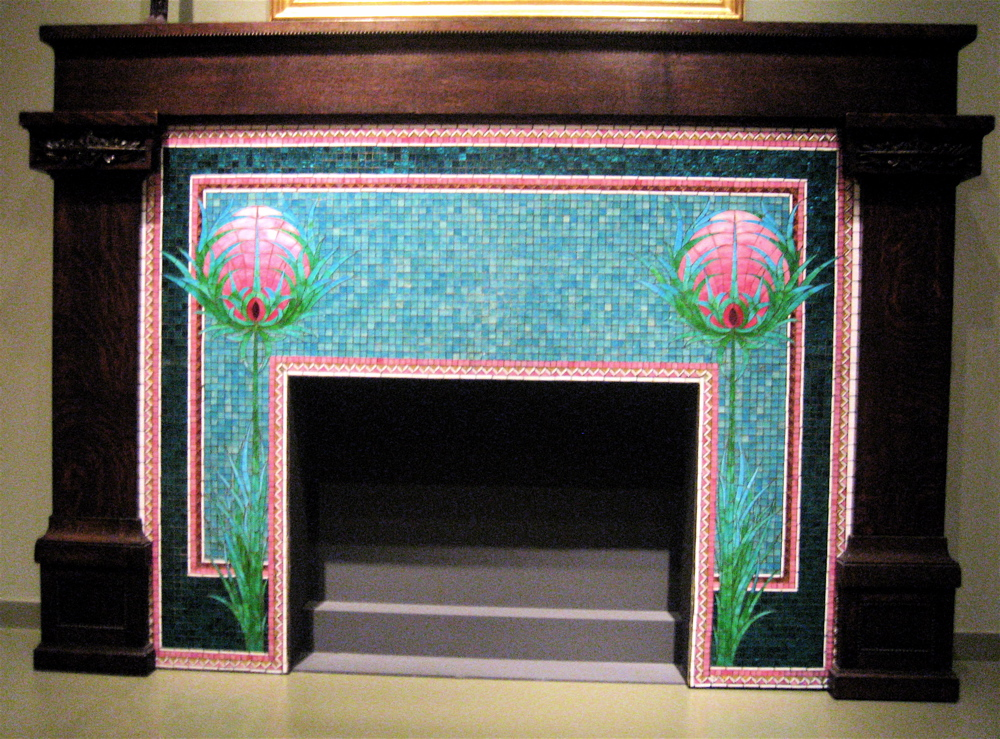
Fireplace surround for Patrick J. King House, now at LACMA

Millet and Healy were friends who studied in Paris together during the 1870s and became business partners after moving to Chicago in 1879.

Millet taught at the Art Institute of Chicago’s school from 1886 until 1918 and directed its department of decorative design. He founded the Chicago School of Architecture in 1893, where multidisciplinary studies in industrial arts were offered with coursework at the Art Institute of Chicago and Armour Institute of Technology. Millet held academic posts at both institutions. Millet was the school's dean.

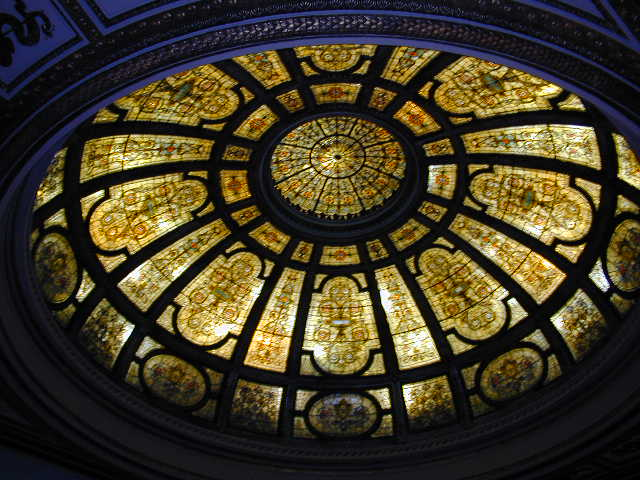
Rotunda at the Chicago Cultural Center The building also has one by Louis Comfort Tiffany

Millet patented a design for a prism light.

Millet made a thistle window for the Patrick J. King House's great room aa well as a similarly themed mosaic fireplace surround with thistle design.

From 1901 to 1903, Millet worked on perhaps his largest career commission at the Mississippi State Capitol in Jackson, Mississippi. Subcontracted to the Chicago contracting firm of W.A. and A.E. Wells (with headquarters in the Monadnock Building), Millet created a rich palette of stained and decorative glass windows, including the brilliantly colored opalescent windows in the Grand Staircase and the skylights for the chamber domes.

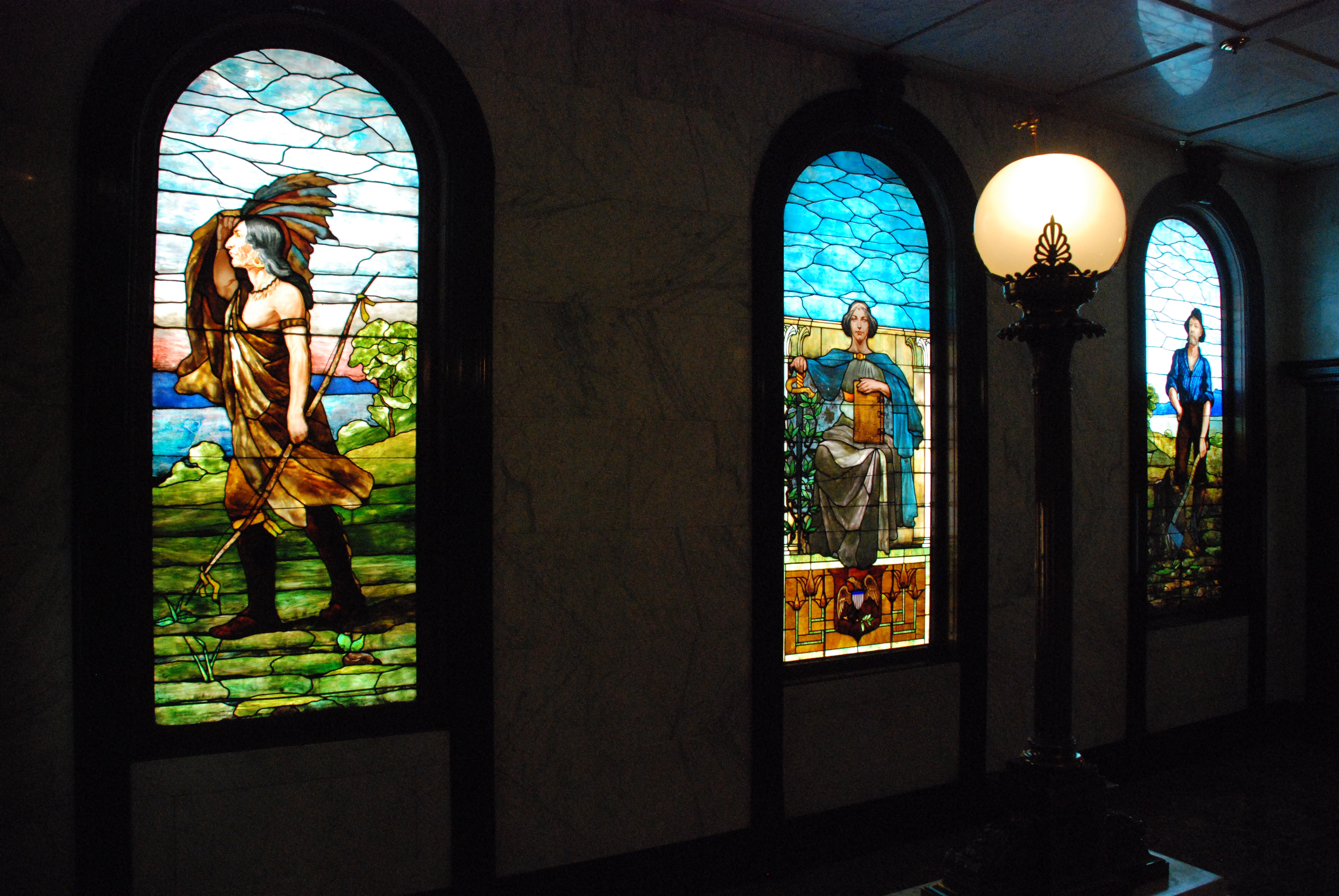
Mississippi State Capitol (1903), grand staircase windows

== Work ==
- Stained glass for Sullivan's Auditorium Building and theater. Exhibited at the Paris World's Fair of 1889 and now part of the Musée d'Orsay's permanent collection. According to one source "changed the way Europe looked at ataijed glass."
- Thistle window from the James A. Patten house

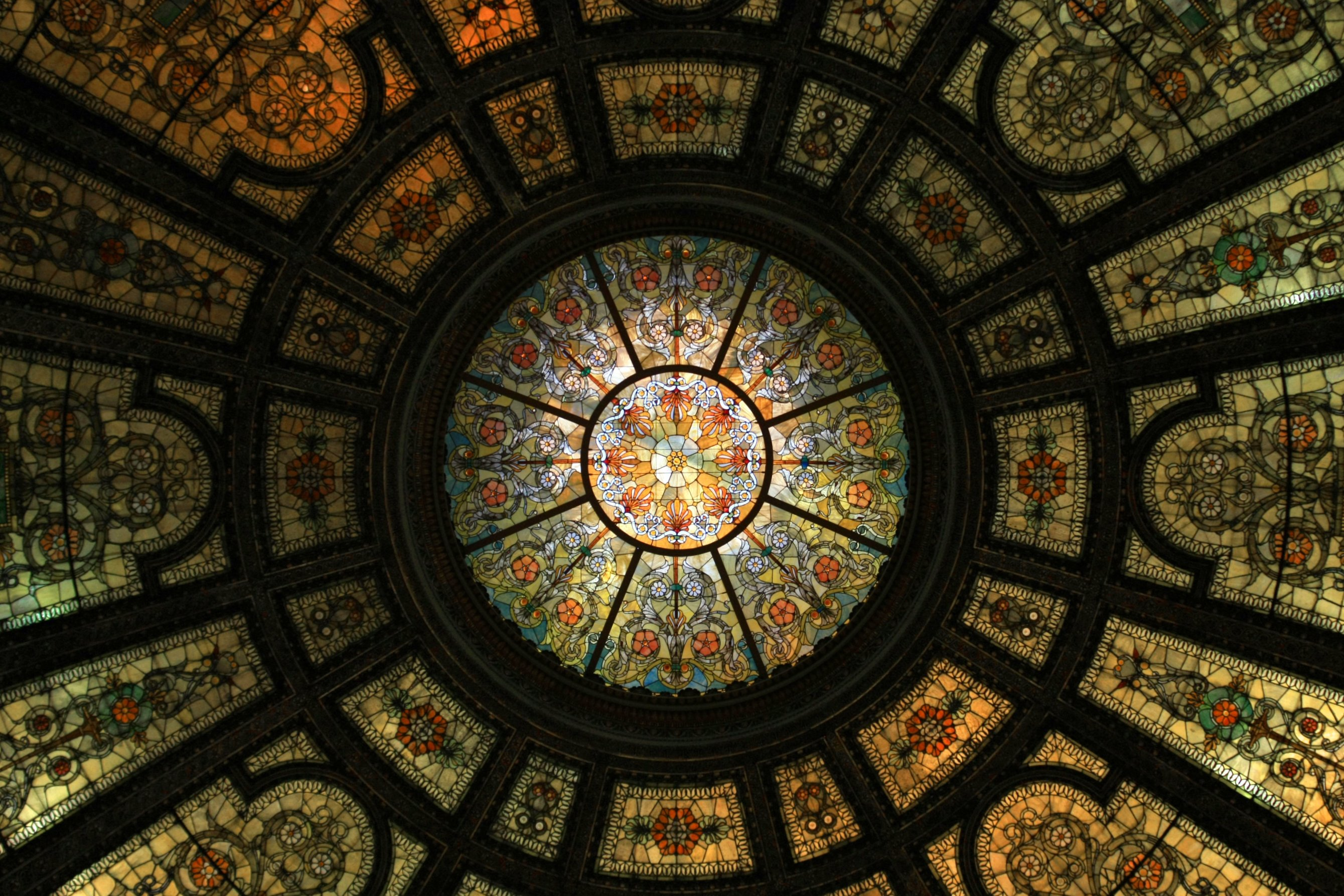
Dome at the Chicago Cultural Center

- Watkins Incorporated headquarters building entrance windows
- Hackley Library stained glass windows in Muskegon, Michigan
- Healy-Millet dome in Grand Army of the Republic hall at the Chicago Cultural Center (formerly the central library of Chicago) with George Healy. The building also has a dome with Louis Comfort Tiffany stained glass
- Friezes at Union Station (St. Louis) in St. Louis, Missouri.
- Stained glass windows at First Christian Church (1913) 840 3rd Ave. SE. Cedar Rapids. Windows were distributed by preservations when the church was demolished.
- Frescoes at the National Farmer's Bank of Owatonna in Owatonna, Minnesota with Louis Sullivan
- Oil on canvas stenciled decoration designed by Louis H. Sullivan at the Chicago Stock Exchange Trading Room. Now in the collection of the Art Institute of Chicago.
- Stained glass windows at Stained Glass Manor-Oak Hall 2430 Drummon Street in Vicksburg, Mississippi. A Maher project.
- Stencil decorations in the interior of Schiller Building's theater for Louis H. Sullivan
- Stained glass window Louis J. Millet designed for James J. Hill’s house on Canada Street in Lowertown and later installed in Louis W. Hill's house at 260 Summit Avenue
- Fireplace surround (1901) for the Patrick J. King House in Chicago. Now at LACMA A Maher project.
- 931 Lake Street church windows, Oak Park, Chicago Illinois
- McVickers Theatre that opened March 30, 1891 was designed by Adler & Sullivan and had decorating and painting by Healy & Millet as well as decor, terra cotta, plaster, curtains and steelwork by other firms.
- Stained glass window at Forrestville School on Forty-fifth street in Chicago memorializing teachers and students lost in the 1903 Iroquois Theater fire. Located on third-floor landing, window included victim's names: Minnie Schaffner, Walter Bissinger, Dora Reynolds, William Hennessy, Ernest and Erma Reynolds and Leon Frady. Pictured a young girl bearing a lamp, shading the flame with her hand. Dedicated May,1905.
- Mississippi State Capitol (1901–1903), stained and decorative glass windows and skylights
- Stained glass window, Second Presbyterian Church, Chicago, IL
