= History of the Museums Association =

The History of the Museums Association is the history of the UK based Museums Association (MA), which is the oldest museum association in the world. The concept was first proposed by Elijah Howarth of the Weston Park Museum, Sheffield in 1877.

== The Objects ==
The objects of the MA were stated as follows:

- The object of the Association shall be the promotion of better and more systematic working of Museums throughout the Kingdom. In order to promote a better knowledge of Museums, the Association shall meet in a different town each succeeding year.
- That each Museum contributing not less than one guinea a year be a Member of the Association, and that individuals interested in scientific work be admitted as Associates on payment of 10s. 6d. annually.
- That each Museum be represented by three delegates, each having one vote. Each Associate to have one vote.
- That each Museum belonging to the Association and each Associate receive one copy of the publications of the Association.
- That a General Meeting of the Association be held annually, for the transaction of business, the reading of papers, and the discussion of matters relating to Museums

== Annual Conferences ==
The Museums Association held annual conferences incorporating the Annual General Meeting, hosted by different museums:

Date	Host museum	President	Notes
1890	William Brown Library and Museum, Liverpool	Henry Higgins	
1891	Cambridge University Museum of Zoology	John Willis Clark	
1892	Manchester Museum	William Boyd Dawkins	
1893	British Museum (Natural History), London	William Henry Flower	
1894	Dublin Science and Art Museum	Valentine Ball	
1895	Hancock Museum, Newcastle-upon-Tyne	Rev. Alfred Merle Norman	
1896	Kelvingrove Art Gallery and Museum, Glasgow	James Paton	
1897	Oxford	Ray Lankester	
1898	Sheffield	William Henry Brittain	
1899	Brighton	Alfred Hawkes	
1900	Canterbury	Henry Woodward	
1901	Edinburgh Museum of Science and Art	William Turner	
1902	Bradford	William Priestley	
1903	Aberdeen	Francis Arthur Bather	
1904	Norwich	Sidney Frederic Harmer	
1905	Worcester	Robert Windsor-Clive, 1st Earl of Plymouth	
1906	Bristol	William Evans Hoyle	
1907	Albert Institute, Dundee	John Maclauchlan	
1908	Ipswich Museum	Jonathan Hutchinson	
