= Greystone (architecture) =

Style of residential building in Chicago

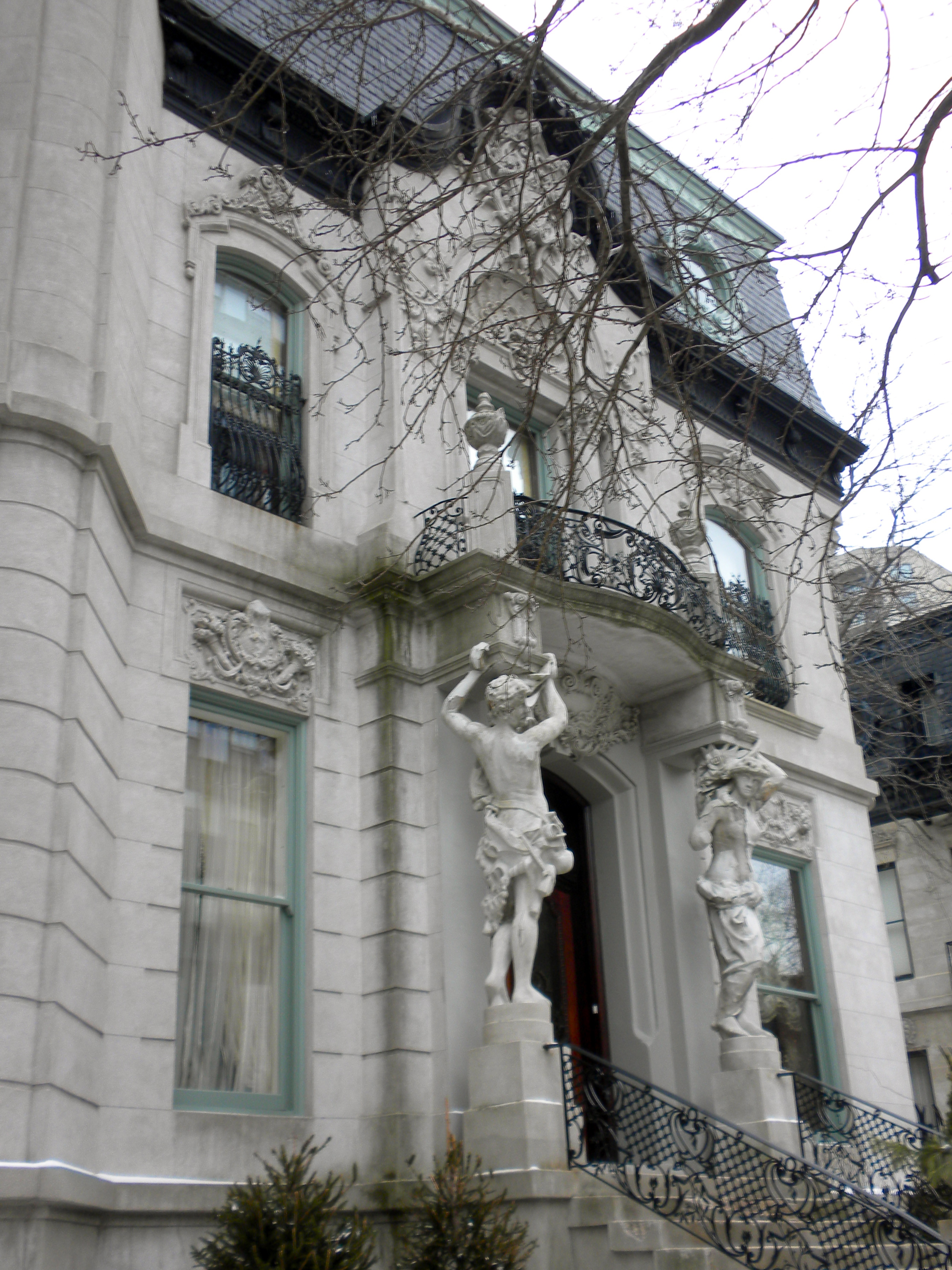
The Francis J. Dewes House, in the Baroque Revival style

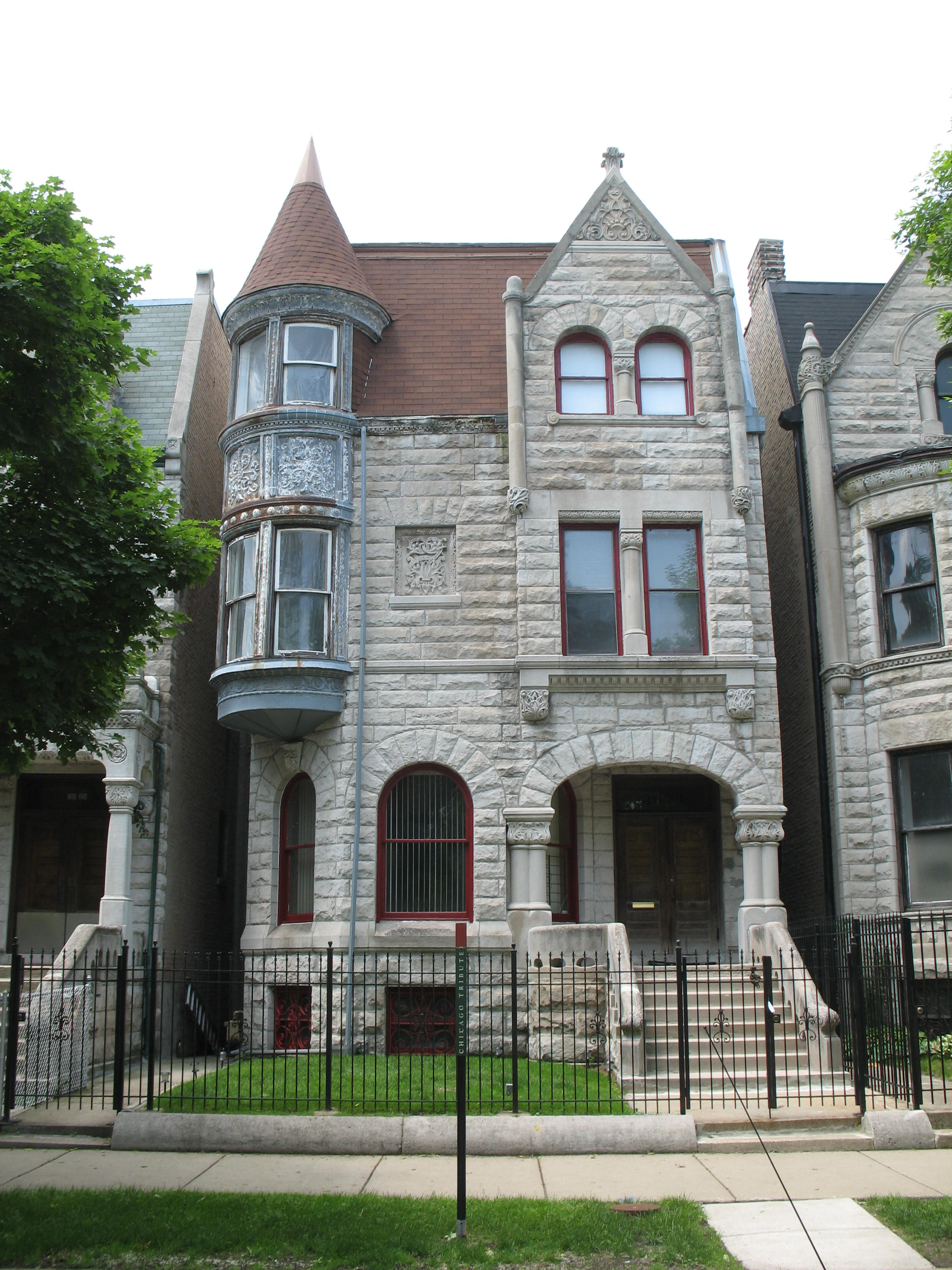
The Ida B. Wells-Barnett House, built in the Romanesque Revival style

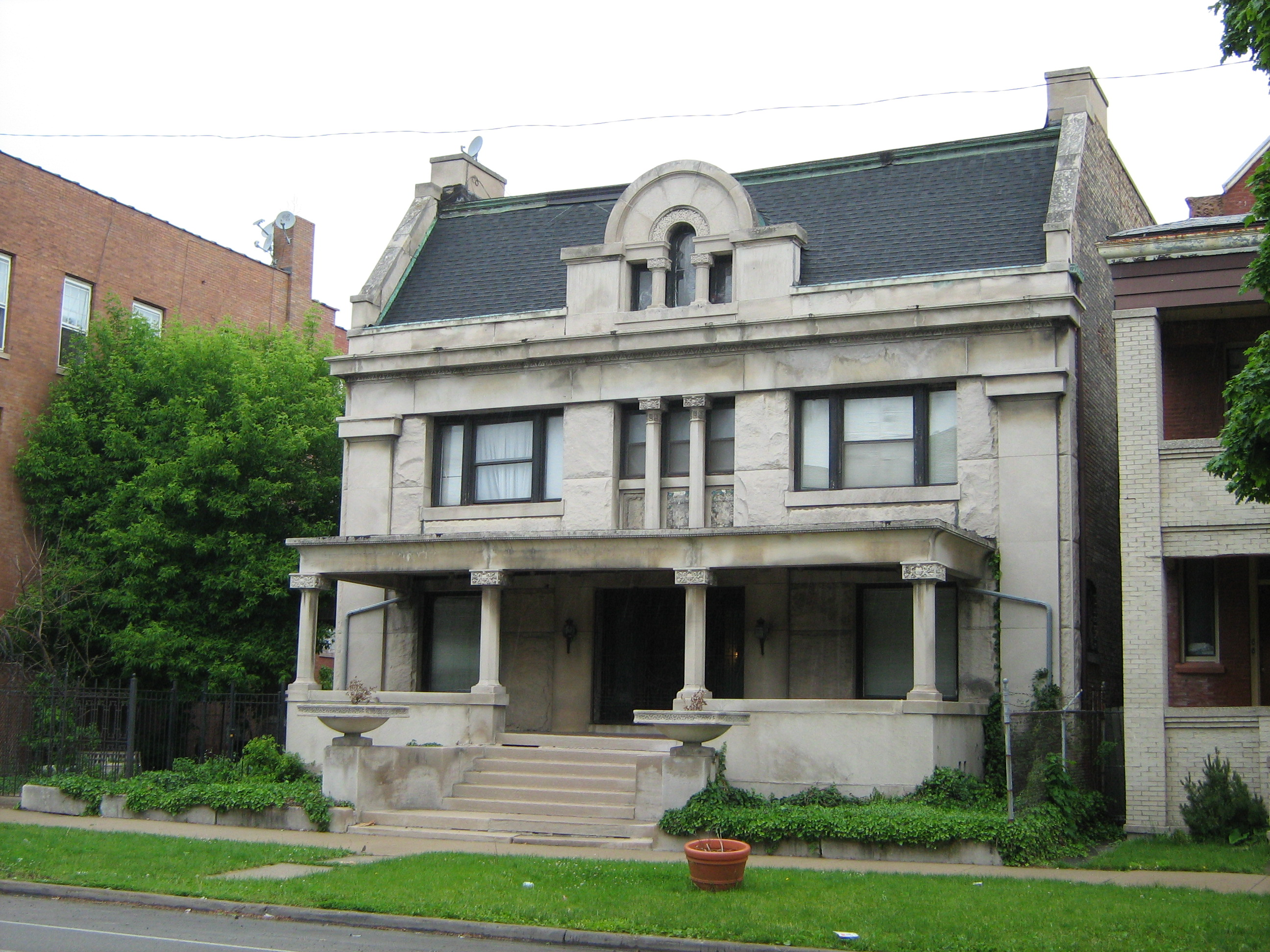
The King–Nash House, featuring Sullivanesque, Colonial Revival, and Prairie styles

Greystones are a style of residential building most commonly found in Chicago, Illinois, United States. As the name suggests, the buildings are typically grey in color and were most often built with Bedford Limestone quarried from South Central Indiana. In Chicago, there are roughly 30,000 greystones, usually built as a semi- or fully detached townhouse.

The term "greystone" is also used to refer to buildings in Montreal, Quebec, Canada (known in French as pierre grise). It refers to the grey limestone facades of many buildings, both residential and institutional, constructed between 1730 and 1920.

== History and usage ==
The building style first began to appear in the 1890s, initially in neighborhoods like Woodlawn and then North Lawndale, and Lake View, and continued through 1930s with two major approaches in design. The first style, between 1890 and 1905, was Romanesque in nature with arches and cornices. This initial style and the choice of grey limestone occurred as the city rebuilt and grew in economic power after the Great Chicago Fire in 1871, though the buildings were designed for a wide range of socioeconomic classes. The second style was predominately built in a Neoclassical design incorporating smoother limestone blocks featuring columns and bay windows.

Greystones were built in a wide variety of sizes to accommodate different residential needs with most being two to three floors in size, many commonly containing two to three flats but some up to six. Regardless of their size, they were always built with the limestone facade facing the street to take advantage of the limited size of standard Chicago lots 25 by 125 feet (7.6 m × 38.1 m). There are an estimated 30,000 greystones still remaining in the city and many citizens, architects and preservationists are working to revive those that remain through the Historic Chicago Greystone Initiative. Many greystones are preserved as the multi-family structures which they were designed and built as.

Today, greystones often retain original Romanesque or Neoclassical details such as "roughly carved blocks of greystone and intricately carved column capitals," though many were built in other styles.

== Styles ==
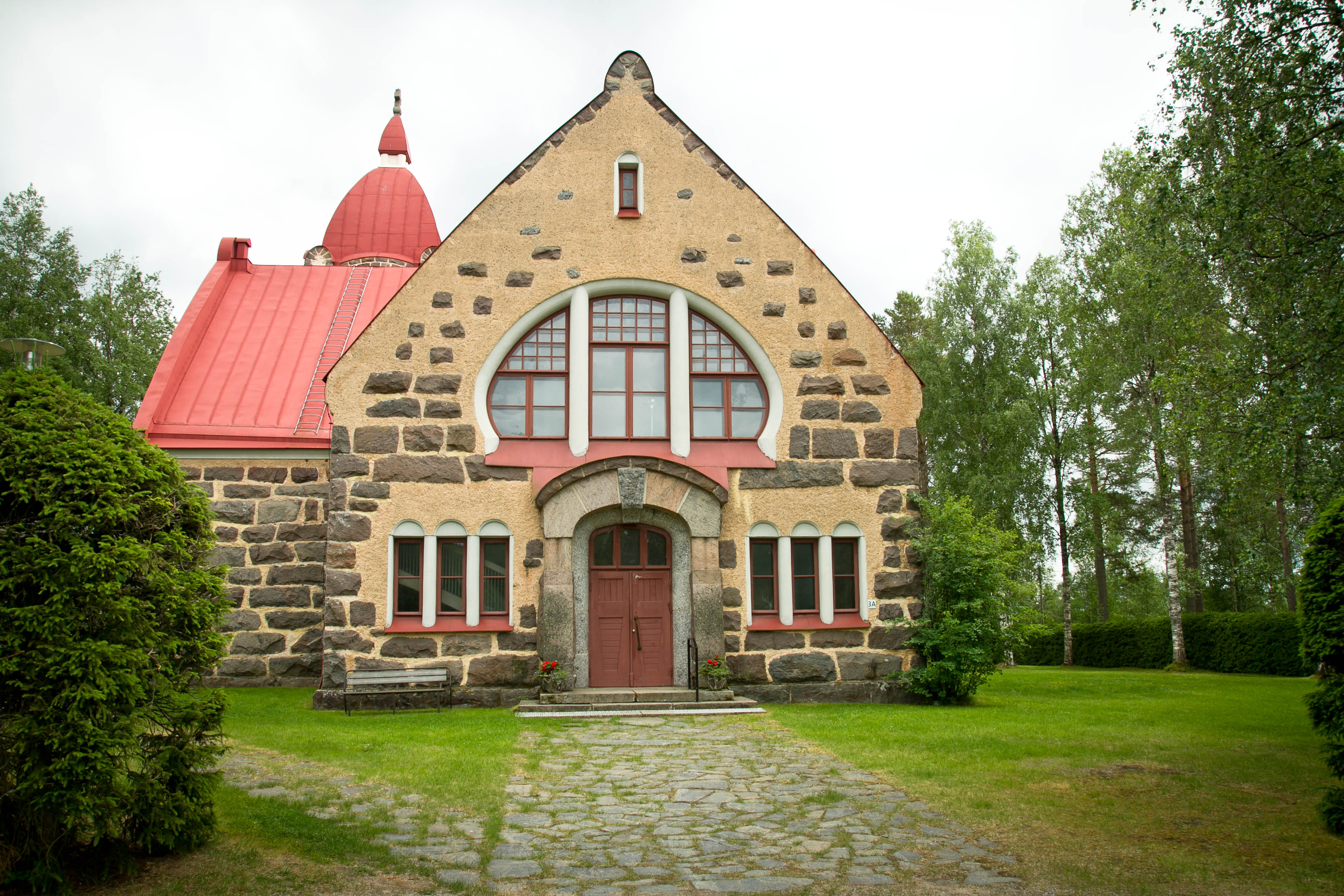
The National Romantic and Art Nouveau styled greystone church in Vuolijoki, Kainuu, Finland.

There are many different styles of greystones, with the City of Chicago defining most attributes for the style for landmark status.

=== Romanesque Revival ===
- "Heavy, rough-cut stone walls
- Round arches and squat columns
- Deeply recessed windows
- Pressed metal bays and turrets"

=== Queen Anne ===
- "Rich but simple ornament
- Wide variety of materials, including wood, stone and pressed metal
- Expansive porches
- Pressed metal bays and turrets
- Irregular roofline with many dormers and chimneys"

=== Chateauesque ===
- "Vertical proportions
- Massive-looking masonry walls
- Ornate carved stone ornament
- High-peaked hipped roofs, elaborate dormers and tall chimneys"

=== Classical Revival/Beaux Arts ===
- "Symmetrical facades
- Minimal use of bays, towers, or other projecting building elements
- Classical ornament, including columns, cornices and triangular pediments
- Wide variety of materials, including brick, stone and wood"

== See also ==
- Brownstone
