= Central Park station (CTA) =

Chicago rapid transit station

Central Park 2100S 3600W
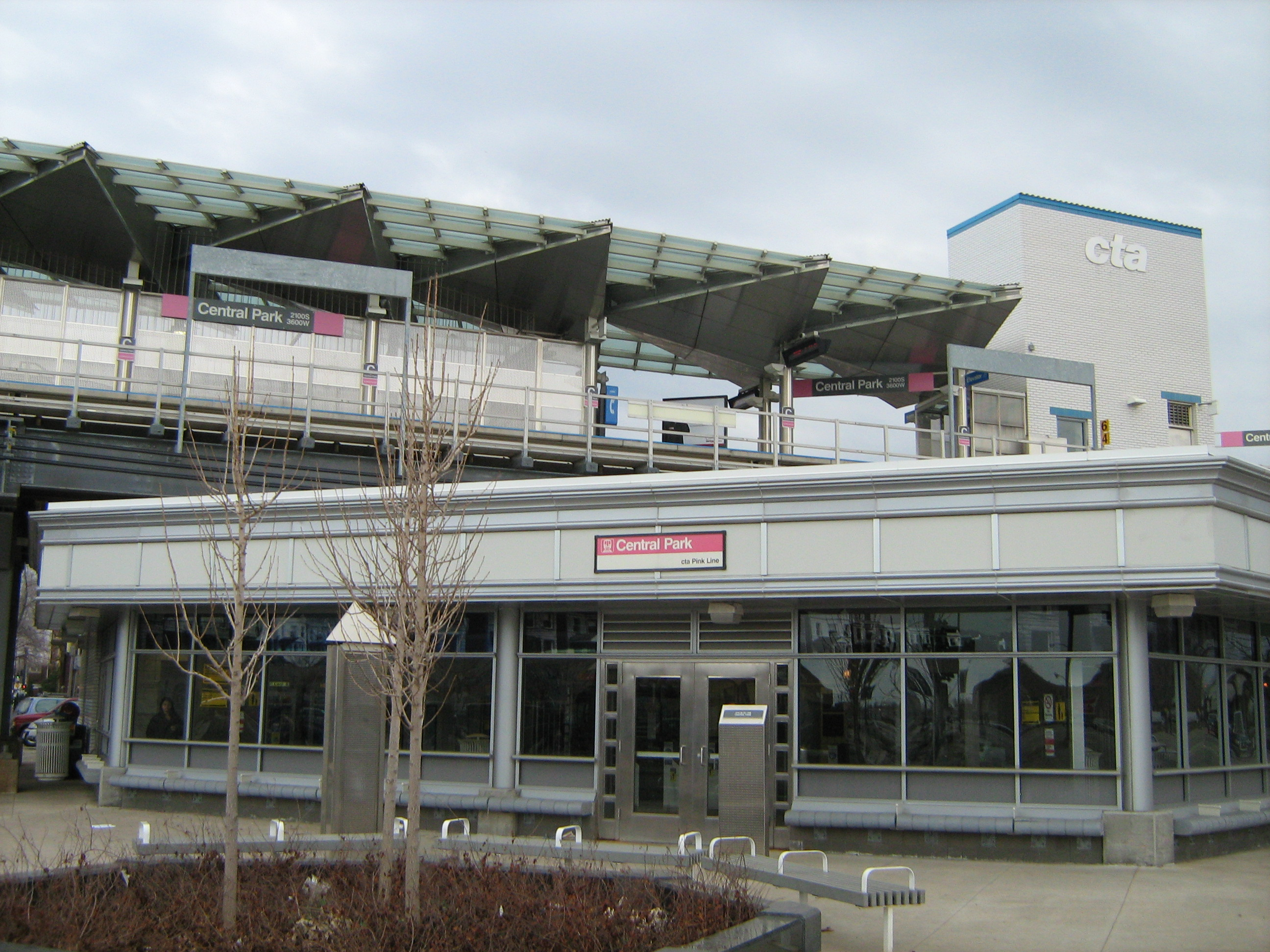

General information
- Location: 1915 South Central Park Avenue; Chicago, Illinois 60623
- Coordinates: 41.853839°N 87.714842°W
- Owner: Chicago Transit Authority
- Line: Cermak Branch
- Platforms: 1 island platform
- Tracks: 2

Construction
- Structure type: Elevated
- Cycle facilities: Yes
- Accessible: Yes

History
- Opened: December 9, 1951; 74 years ago
- Rebuilt: 1977, 2002–2004; 22 years ago

Passengers
- 2025: 239,780 ▼3.2%

Services
Preceding station	Chicago "L"	Following station
Pulaski toward 54th/Cermak	Pink Line	Kedzie toward Loop (Clark/Lake)
Former services
Preceding station	Chicago "L"	Following station
Pulaski toward 54th/Cermak	Blue Line Cermak branch	Kedzie toward O'Hare
Track layout
Location

Central Park is a station on the Chicago Transit Authority's 'L' system, serving the Pink Line and the North Lawndale neighborhood. The station opened on December 9, 1951, as a replacement for the closed Drake, Lawndale, and Homan stations.

== Bus connections ==
CTA

- 82 Kimball/Homan
- 157 Streeterville/Taylor (weekdays only)
