= North Lawndale, Chicago =

Community area in Chicago, Illinois

North Lawndale
- Community area
- Community Area 29 - North Lawndale
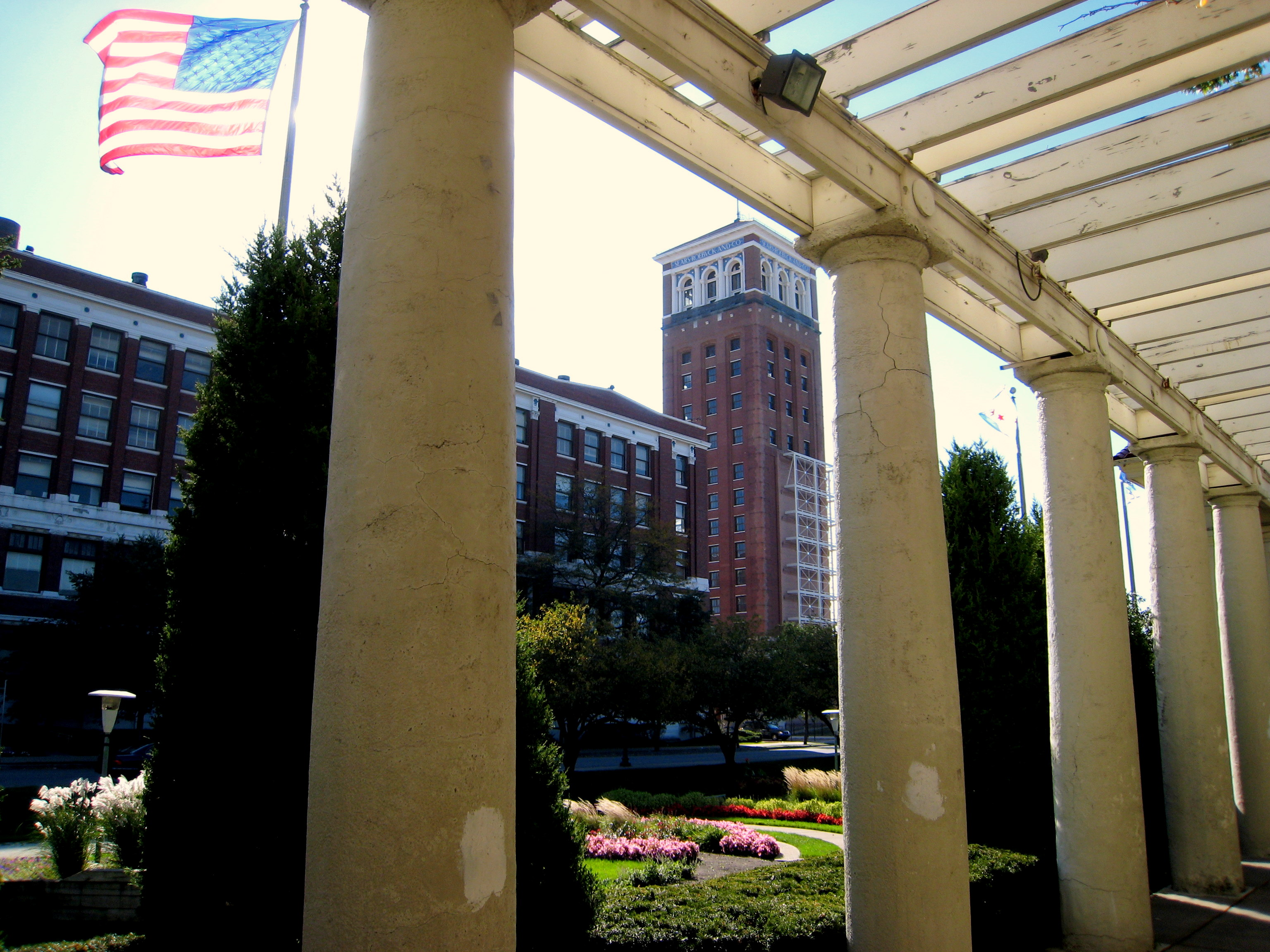
- The former Sears Merchandise Building's Tower, as seen from the Sunken Garden

- Location within the city of Chicago
- Coordinates: 41°51.6′N 87°42.6′W
- Country: United States
- State: Illinois
- County: Cook
- City: Chicago
- Neighborhoods: List: Lawndale; Homan Square; Douglas Park

Area
  - Total: 3.20 sq mi (8.29 km^{2})

Population (2024)
  - Total: 33,958
  - Density: 10,600/sq mi (4,100/km^{2})

Demographics 2024
  - White: 4.2%
  - Black: 78.5%
  - Hispanic: 15.0%
  - Asian: 0.4%
  - Other: 1.8%

Educational Attainment 2024
  - High School Diploma or Higher: 83.4%
  - Bachelor's Degree or Higher: 15.3%
- Time zone: UTC-6 (CST)
  - Summer (DST): UTC-5 (CDT)
- ZIP Codes: parts of 60608, 60623 and 60624
- Median household income (2023): $37,247
- Source: U.S. Census, Record Information Services

North Lawndale is one of the 77 community areas of Chicago in Illinois, United States, located on the city's West Side. The community area includes the K-Town Historic District, the Homan Square interrogation facility (part of the former Sears, Roebuck and Company Complex), and the city's largest concentration of greystones.

North Lawndale was annexed to Chicago from Cicero Township in 1869. Following the Great Chicago Fire of 1871, industrial workers moved to the area, including employees of a new McCormick Reaper Company plant. By the end of the 19th century, the neighborhood was heavily populated with immigrants from the Austro-Hungarian Empire, particularly Czech residents, who established cultural institutions and churches in the area. During the early 20th century, many Czech residents relocated to suburban areas, and Jews, many formerly from the Maxwell Street area, became the majority by approximately 1918.

By the mid-1950s, much of the Jewish population had relocated northward due to white flight as Black residents from Chicago’s South Side and the American South became the largest demographic group in North Lawndale. ln 1966, Martin Luther King Jr. stayed in an apartment in North Lawndale as part of the Chicago Freedom Movement. Starting in the 1960s, the area experienced population loss and economic decline associated with housing discrimination, municipal disinvestment, and institutional racism.

In 1968, community residents formed the Contract Buyers League to address discriminatory housing practices. In 1986, the Steans Family Foundation was established and began focusing grantmaking and programs in North Lawndale. By the 1990s, the foundation and other observers noted signs of reinvestment, including new retail development, the arrival of new residents (many of them Hispanic), and a slowing of population decline.

Reinvestment efforts since the 1990s have included proposals for greenway parks and new housing developments. Beginning in 2021, violence prevention initiatives led by READI Chicago, Communities Partnering 4 Peace, and Chicago CRED expanded relationship-based intervention strategies in the community. City funding supported the creation of a Community Safety and Coordination Center to centralize local resources. During the early 2020s, North Lawndale experienced a reduction in reported gun violence.

== History ==
=== Annexation to Chicago and first waves ===
Once part of Cicero Township, Illinois, the eastern section of what is now North Lawndale—extending east to Pulaski Road—was annexed to the city of Chicago in 1869 by an act of the Illinois state legislature. Following annexation, streets were platted and drainage ditches were installed between Western Avenue (2400 West) and Pulaski Road (4000 West). The name "Lawndale" was introduced by the real estate firm Millard and Decker, which subdivided the area in 1870.

After the Great Chicago Fire of 1871, the McCormick Reaper Company—which later merged into International Harvester—constructed a large manufacturing plant in neighboring South Lawndale. Many plant workers subsequently settled in eastern North Lawndale. The remaining portion of the area west of Crawford Avenue (later Pulaski Road) was annexed in 1889 through a resolution of the Cook County Board of Commissioners.

By 1890, North Lawndale had become heavily populated by Bohemian immigrants from the Austro-Hungarian Empire. Czech settlement was concentrated primarily west of Pulaski Road and between 12th Street (now Roosevelt Road) and 16th Street. The real estate firm W. A. Merigold & Co. was the principal developer of this section, which became informally known as Merigold. Czech cultural and social institutions were established beginning in the 1890s, including Slovanská Lípa/Sokol Tábor, a fraternal and gymnastic organization located at 13th Street and Karlov Avenue. In 1892, the Bohemian Catholic parish of Our Lady of Lourdes was founded at 15th Street and Keeler Avenue. In 1909, the Czech Freethinkers School, František Palacký, opened at 1525 South Kedvale Avenue. Czech residents also referred to the Merigold area as Nový Tábor ("New Camp").

A major Czech cultural institution, the Česká Beseda, was established in 1912 at 3659 W. Douglas Boulevard. The club served as a center for social, literary, theatrical, and musical activity for Chicago's Czech elite, as well as visitors from elsewhere in the United States and Czechoslovakia. Czech residents spread throughout North Lawndale and were among the original owners of many of the neighborhood's greystone buildings. Many of the wealthy members of the Bohemian community lived along the 1800 and 1900 blocks of South Millard Avenue. Anton Dvořák Public Elementary School, located at 3615 West 16th Street, was named for the Czech composer Antonín Dvořák. Several Czech residents of North Lawndale held positions in municipal and county government.

Historical population
Census	Pop.	Note	%±
1930	112,261		—
1940	102,470		−8.7%
1950	100,489		−1.9%
1960	124,937		24.3%
1970	94,871		−24.1%
1980	61,534		−35.1%
1990	47,296		−23.1%
2000	41,768		−11.7%
2010	35,912		−14.0%
2020	34,794		−3.1%

After World War I, Czech residents increasingly relocated to the western suburbs of Cicero, Berwyn, Riverside, and Brookfield. By the 1920s, much of the Czech population had left, and Jews—many of whom had moved from the racially integrating Maxwell Street area—became the majority population. North Lawndale developed into the largest Jewish settlement in Chicago, containing approximately one-quarter of the city’s Jewish population. From about 1918 through the early 1950s, Jews, primarily of Russian and Eastern European origin, dominated the neighborhood.

=== White flight and disinvestment ===
The Jewish population of North Lawndale declined by the mid-20th century as wealthier residents relocated, primarily to neighborhoods farther north. During the 1950s, Black residents migrated into North Lawndale from Chicago’s South Side and from southern states, which caused white flight. In a span of about ten years, the white population of North Lawndale dropped from 87% to less than 9%.

In 1966, Martin Luther King Jr. visited North Lawndale and resided temporarily in a local apartment to draw attention to housing discrimination and substandard housing conditions. He used this experience to advocate against discriminatory housing practices at the national level, contributing to broader support for what became the Civil Rights Act of 1968.

According to the Steans Family Foundation, the decades following the 1960s were marked by a series of economic and social disruptions. Civil unrest following the assassination of Martin Luther King Jr. in 1968 resulted in significant damage to commercial corridors, particularly along Roosevelt Road, and accelerated economic decline. By 1970, approximately 75% of local businesses had closed. This period also saw the shutdown or relocation of major industrial employers, including International Harvester in 1969; Sears, which relocated partially in 1974 and fully by 1987; Zenith and Sunbeam during the 1970s; and Western Electric during the 1980s. According to the 1980 United States census, 58% of residents aged 17 and older were unemployed.

As employment contracted, residents with sufficient resources increasingly moved out of the neighborhood. The loss of thousands of jobs and broader industrial restructuring from the 1960s through the 1980s resulted in widespread poverty and widespread disinvestment. Many residential buildings were abandoned, and thousands of structures were demolished. Large areas of land remained vacant for decades, with redevelopment occurring only gradually during the building and real estate boom of the 2000s. As a result of these combined factors, North Lawndale’s total population declined by more than 70% between the 1960s and 2000s.

Jonathan Kozol devoted a chapter of Savage Inequalities: Children in America’s Schools (1991) to North Lawndale, describing the neighborhood as "an industrial slum without the industry". He noted that at the time the area had limited financial and retail infrastructure, including one bank and one supermarket, alongside numerous lottery agents and bars.

In 1986, the Steans Family Foundation was established to focus grantmaking and programming efforts in North Lawndale. During the 1990s, the foundation reported early signs of stabilization and revitalization, including new housing and a shopping plaza associated with the Homan Square development. While the overall population continued to decline, new residents—primarily Hispanic—accounted for a growing share of the population, reaching approximately 4.5%.

According to Charles Leeks, director of NHS, North Lawndale contains the largest concentration of greystone buildings in Chicago. In late 2004, the City of Chicago launched the Historic Chicago Greystone Initiative to promote the preservation of these structures.

=== Contract Buyers League ===
The Contract Buyers League (CBL) was a grassroots organization formed in 1968 by residents of the North Lawndale community. Assisted by Jack MacNamara, a Jesuit seminarian, and twelve white college students based at Presentation Roman Catholic Church, led by Msgr. Jack Egan, the CBL fought the discriminatory real estate practice known as "contract selling".

Groups similar to the CBL formed in cities around the country to combat contract selling. The CBL was the most influential in winning justice for exploited black homebuyers. The CBL renegotiated 400 contracts for its members, saving residents an estimated $25,000,000. The FHA finally responded to pressure from the CBL by reforming its discriminatory underwriting policies in order to lend to blacks.

North Lawndale was featured in a video explaining the impact of housing discrimination and predatory lending in Chicago.

=== Revitalization ===
Though the departure of Sears and other businesses from the area had devastated the neighborhood, the repurposing of the Sears complex – known as Homan Square – would aid in rebuilding the community. Beginning in the mid 1990s, homeowners came to fill approximately 350 affordable housing units, and a new grocery store. However, the 2008 financial crisis set the area back; the grocery store closed, replaced with a grocery store with more limited options and creating a food desert. In the following years, community nonprofit organizations led change in the area: UCAN, a center for disadvantaged youths moved to the area in 2016, and violence prevention groups led by READI Chicago, Communities Partnering 4 Peace, and Chicago CRED reduced violence and crime in the area by tens of percentage points after beginning area operations in 2021, returning $3-$7 to the community for every $1 invested. Later in 2021, the city opened the community-led Community Safety and Coordination Center, a centralized community resource center for many types of issues.

In 2022, the neighborhood's first black-owned grocery store opened, using produce and grocery giveaways that served 300-500 families per day to build trust in the neighborhood, following a strategy from the Black Panther Party. This followed a black-owned health food store that opened in the neighborhood in 2018.

== Subsections ==
=== K-Town ===
K-Town is a nickname for an area in Humboldt Park, North Lawndale, and West Garfield Park (Note: Although these long streets extend beyond the bounds of North Lawndale, and West Garfield Park, published sources identify the name K-Town as referring specifically to an area of North Lawndale, and West Garfield Park, i.e. the area through which these streets pass.) between Pulaski Road and Cicero Avenue in which the names of many north–south avenues begin with the letter K (Karlov, Keating, Kedvale, Keeler, Kenneth, Kenton, Keystone, Kilbourn, Kildare, Kilpatrick, Kirkland, Knox, Kolin, Kolmar, Komensky, and Kostner). The pattern is a historical relic of a 1913 street-naming proposal, by which streets were to be systematically named according to their distance from the Illinois-Indiana border; K, the eleventh letter, was to be assigned to streets within the eleventh mile, counting west from the state line. The eleventh mile is the easternmost area in which the plan was widely implemented, as many neighborhoods to the east were already developed and had street names in place. The portion of K-Town bounded by W. Kinzie St, W. Cermak Rd, S. Kostner Ave, and S. Pulaski Rd was listed as a historic district on the National Register of Historic Places on September 9, 2010.

John W. Fountain wrote in his 2005 memoir:

K-Town is a city within a city, a fifteen-minute drive from downtown Chicago's skyscrapers ... I used to joke that the "K" stood for "kill." I was only half-joking ... it had developed a reputation for being one of the rougher places in the city. ... K-Town is where my grandfather ... and all the other black folk that flocked to the West Side during the mid-to-late-1950s bought proud brick houses on tree-lined streets with crackless cement sidewalks. ...

=== Homan Square ===
The site of the former Sears headquarters was redeveloped beginning in 1988 as Homan Square. In 1993, residents at a community discussion expressed fear of being developed out, with renters having few protections from rising rent. The development has included new construction of owned and rental mixed-income housing; adaptive reuse and restoration of historic properties for use as community center, school, and other facilities; a new community pool and recreation center; and associated retail. Homan Square is often used as an example of the revitalization of North Lawndale. The former Sears tower was rehabbed and reopened to the public as "The John D. and Alexandra C. Nichols Tower" in 2015. It now houses non-profit groups and youth association offices. Despite the renaming, the tower retains the "Sears Roebuck" plaque on top of the building. The 14th floor of the tower is now used as a space for parties and other community events. A windowless portion of the building indicates the tower's former connection to the Sears Merchandise Building. The complex before demolition was situated along the former Baltimore and Ohio Chicago Terminal Railroad line (now CSX).

Homan Square was the area that housed a police compound "likened to a CIA black site" in 2012, where people were held without their rights being respected.

== Infrastructure and transportation ==
The United States Postal Service operates the Otis Grant Collins Post Office at 2302 South Pulaski Road.

The Chicago Transit Authority's Pink Line serves this neighborhood. Stations are located at Kedzie, Central Park, Pulaski, and Kostner.

In 2022, the city heard proposals for the Altenheim Line, an elevated park similar to the Bloomingdale (606) Trail, that would be developed on the site of former rail lines with existing rail running near the park. Some residents expressed concerns about gentrification; Alderman Michael Scott Jr. expressed that he was confident the community could avoid gentrification and keep residents there due to being able to control the market price with much land being owned by both the city and the Cook County Land Bank Authority.

== Crime ==
Historian Paul Street, citing a 2001 demographic study by Claritas Inc., writes that more than 70% of men aged 18–45 residing in North Lawndale had criminal records.

Beginning in 2021, violence prevention groups led by READI Chicago, Communities Partnering 4 Peace, and Chicago CRED began using large-scale relationship-based intervention tactics in the neighborhood. Flatlining Violence Inspires Peace provided street outreach workers, a major component of the joint movement. The initiatives also included providing the residents – with a focus on young men – with social services such as trauma-informed cognitive behavioral therapy and economic opportunities such as job training and legal support. Three years ago, the city's budget for violence prevention had been less than $1 million per year. In 2021, the city spent approximately $50 million on violence prevention, with additional support from private funds, which allowed violence prevention groups to work collaboratively instead of competing for grants. The funds also supported the summer 2021 creation of a new, community-led Community Safety and Coordination Center, a central site for resources for gender-based violence, housing initiatives, youth programs, and physical and mental health, as well as job readiness programs partnered with labor unions. In 2022, the budget accounts for $85 million towards similar services.

Evaluations from the University of Chicago Crime Lab in 2022 found that participants in the youth program Choose to Change had "48% fewer violent crime arrests and 32% fewer school misconduct incidents than their control group peers," while participants in the male gun violence prevention program READI Chicago had "63 percent fewer arrests and 19% fewer victimizations for shootings and homicides." The Crime Lab further stated that there is "about 85% confidence that for every dollar invested in a program like READI Chicago, society reaps $3 to $7 in return."

From 2021 to 2022, North Lawndale saw a 58% decrease in gun violence.

== Education ==
The area is in Chicago Public Schools and is served by the following high schools: Farragut Career Academy and North Lawndale College Prep High School.

As of 2020, North Lawndale experienced much student loss, much of it due to people leaving the city but also due to having "the most charter schools and [the] highest percentage of students enrolled in charter schools" out of all Chicago community areas. Less than 30% of students in the West Side attended their zoned public schools. Early the same year, charter elementary school Frazier Preparatory Academy was closed for performance reasons, and students were split between Lawndale Community Academy, Sumner Math and Science Community Academy, and Crown Community Academy of Fine Arts. Later that year, the community heard proposals to merge the three schools into one new STEAM school due to low enrollment.

By 2022, the neighborhood received a new proposal to create the new STEAM elementary school without consolidating the other three schools; the new school's student body would be made of 80% Lawndale residents and 20% from elsewhere in the city.

== Notable people ==
=== Arts, literature, and entertainment ===
- Shelley Berman (1925–2017), comedian, actor, writer, teacher, lecturer and poet. He was a childhood resident of North Lawndale.
- Andre Braugher (1962–2023), actor (Glory, Homicide: Life on the Street, Brooklyn Nine-Nine). He was born and raised in North Lawndale.
- Steelo Brim (born 1988), television personality, host, and actor
- Ruth Duskin Feldman (1934–2015), Quiz Kids panelist and author. She was a childhood resident of 1660 South Troy Street.
- Benny Goodman, clarinetist nicknamed the "King of Swing," grew up at 1125 S. Francisco Avenue
- Ahuvah Gray, author, grew up in the neighborhood, she now lives in Israel.
- Irv Kupcinet (1912–2003), newspaper columnist and radio personality. He was a childhood resident of North Lawndale.
- Michael Peña, actor (Crash, Million Dollar Baby, End of Watch, Fury, Ant-Man). Born and raised in North Lawndale.
- Ramsey Lewis (born 1935), jazz composer
- Kim Novak (born 1933), actor, lived at 1910 S. Springfield Ave.
- Harold Ramis (1944–2014), actor, comedian, director and writer. Ramis was a childhood resident of North Lawndale living at 13th Street and Keeler Avenue and 14th Street and Kostner Avenue before his family moved to Rogers Park as part of the white flight of the era.
- Jean Terrell, singer who replaced Diana Ross as the lead singer of The Supremes in January 1970.
- Twista, rapper.
- Dinah Washington, "Queen of the Blues," lived at 1518 S. Trumbull Avenue.

=== Athletes ===
- Kevin Garnett, basketball player
- Mickey Johnson, basketball player
- Darryl Stingley, football player for the New England Patriots.
- Marques Sullivan, football player, grew up at 1818 S. Kedzie Avenue
- Ernie Terrell, (1939 – 2014) singer and former WBA heavyweight boxing champion, brother of Jean Terrell of The Supremes.
- Isiah Thomas, basketball player for the Detroit Pistons.

=== Business ===
- Julius Rosenwald, co-founder and president of Sears, Roebuck & Co.

=== Military ===
- Hyman G. Rickover, United States Navy Admiral known as the "Father of the Nuclear Navy"

=== Politics, law, activism, and nonprofits ===
- Jacob Arvey (1895–1977), politician and influential leader in the Cook County Democratic Party.
- Ertharin Cousin, 12th Executive Director of the United Nations World Food Programme. She was raised in North Lawndale.
- Danny K. Davis (born 1941), U.S. Representative, former executive director of the Greater Lawndale Conservation Commission
- Elmer Gertz (1906–2000), lawyer and civil rights activist notable as the plaintiff in Gertz v. Robert Welch, Inc.. He was a childhood resident of North Lawndale.
- Andrea Jenkins (born 1961), first black openly transgender woman elected to public office in the United States upon her election to the Minneapolis City Council in 2017. Jenkins was a childhood resident of North Lawndale.
- Martin Luther King Jr. (1929–1968), civil rights leader, lived at 1550 S. Hamlin Ave. in 1966 while campaigning against housing discrimination in Chicago.
- Meyer Levin (1905–1981), attorney. He was a childhood resident of North Lawndale.
- Benjamin F. Lewis (1909–1963), member of the Chicago City Council from Chicago's 24th ward from 1958 until he was murdered in his ward office in 1963. He was a resident of 3457 West 13th Place.
- William Lorimer (1861–1934), Republican member of the United States Senate from 1909 until his expulsion in 1912. He resided in a mansion at 3659 West Douglas Boulevard.
- Abraham Lincoln Marovitz (1905–2001), Judge of the United States District Court for the Northern District of Illinois from 1963 to 1975. He was a resident of 1323 South Independence Boulevard while a member of the Illinois Senate in the 1930s and 1940s.
- Golda Meir, Prime Minister of Israel. She briefly lived at 1306 S. Lawndale Avenue in 1917 while working at the Lawndale Branch Library
- Gloria Pughsley, delegate to the Sixth Illinois Constitutional Convention

== Popular culture ==
Since 2011, the neighborhood has been the primary filming location for the Showtime series Shameless, although the show is set in the city's Back of the Yards neighborhood.

Another Showtime TV series, The Chi, which debuted in 2018 and is set on the South Side of Chicago, films in the neighborhood.
