= Pulaski station (CTA Pink Line) =

Chicago rapid transit station

Pulaski 4000W 2100S
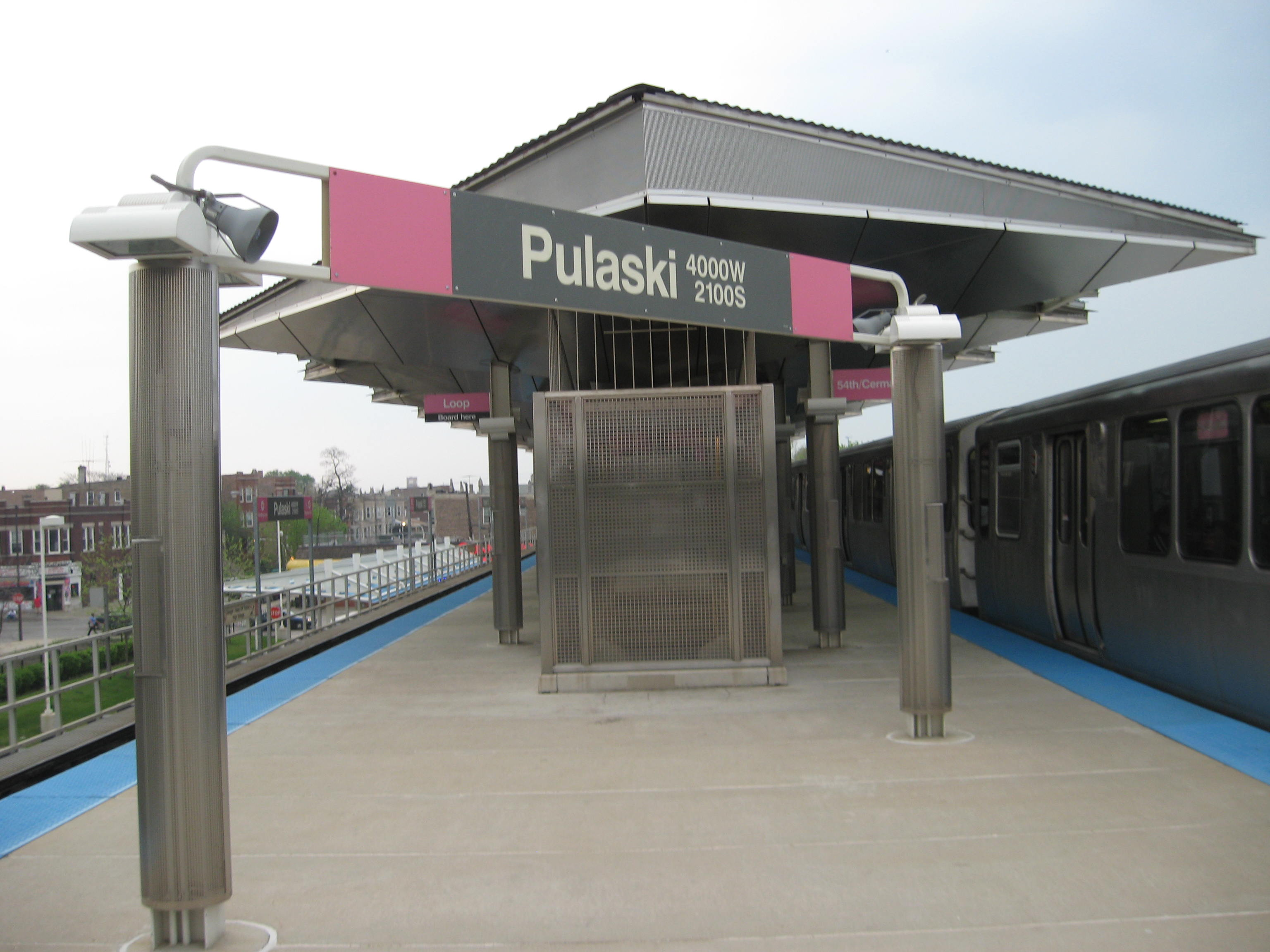

General information
- Location: 2021 South Pulaski Road; Chicago, Illinois 60623
- Coordinates: 41.853732°N 87.724311°W
- Owner: Chicago Transit Authority
- Line: Cermak Branch
- Platforms: 1 island platform
- Tracks: 2

Construction
- Structure type: Elevated
- Cycle facilities: Yes
- Accessible: Yes

History
- Opened: June 16, 1902; 124 years ago
- Rebuilt: 2002–2004; 22 years ago
- Former names: 40th Avenue Terminal; Crawford Avenue

Passengers
- 2025: 232,628 ▼5.1%

Services
Preceding station	Chicago "L"	Following station
Kostner toward 54th/Cermak	Pink Line	Central Park toward Loop (Clark/Lake)
Former services
Preceding station	Chicago "L"	Following station
Kostner toward 54th/Cermak	Blue Line Cermak branch	Central Park toward O'Hare
Kostner toward Oak Park	Douglas branch	Lawndale Closed 1951 toward Marshfield
Track layout
Location

Pulaski is an 'L' station on the CTA's Pink Line, located in the North Lawndale neighborhood. Pulaski opened on June 16, 1902, as part of the Douglas Park branch of the Metropolitan West Side Elevated Railroad. It served as the terminus of that line until its 1907 extension to 48th Avenue.

== Bus connections ==
CTA

- 53 Pulaski (Owl Service)
- 157 Streeterville/Taylor (Weekdays only)
