= Cicero station (CTA Pink Line) =

Chicago rapid transit station

Cicero 4800W 2200S
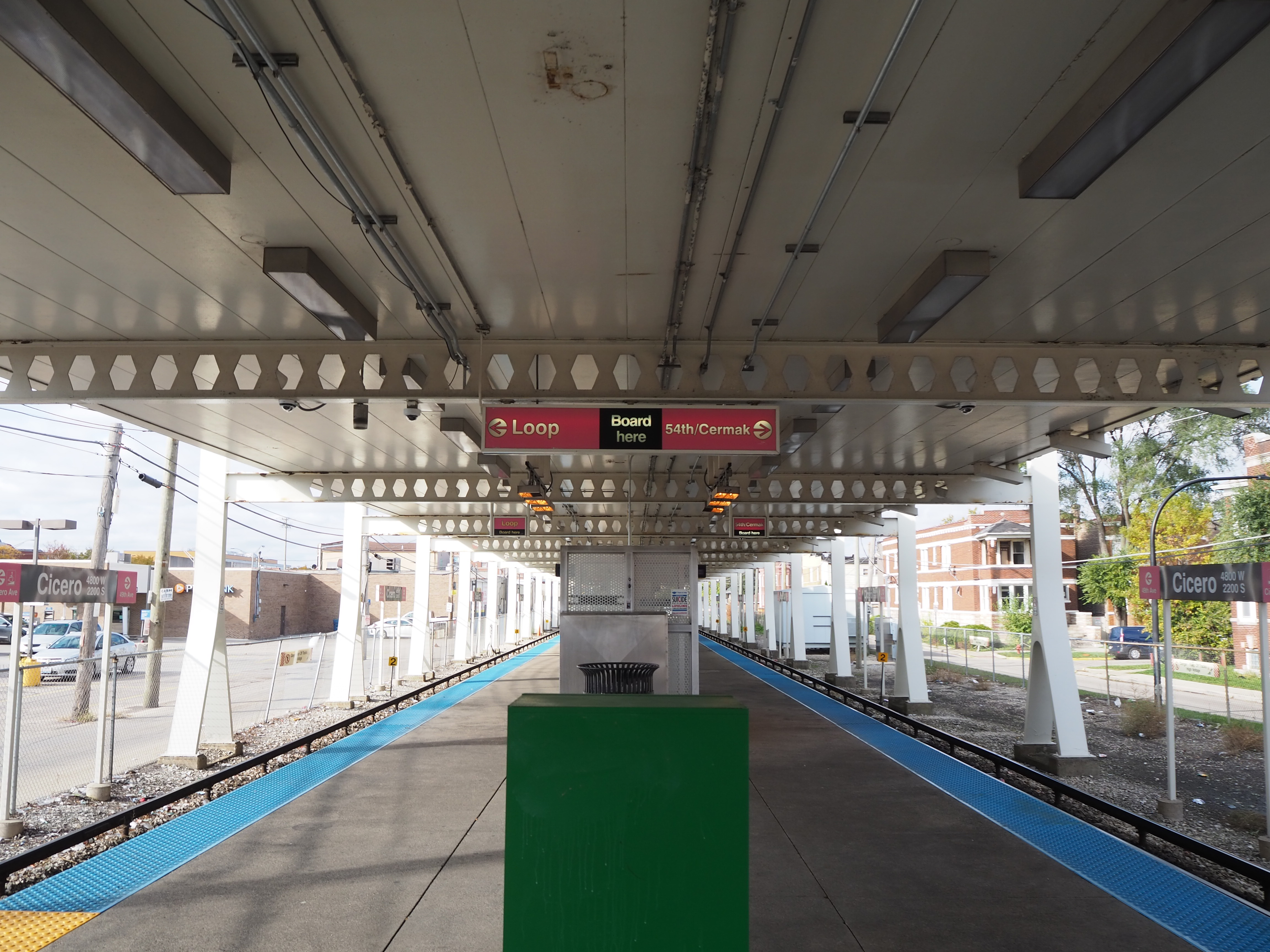

General information
- Location: 2134 South Cicero Avenue; Cicero, Illinois 60804
- Coordinates: 41.85182°N 87.745336°W
- Owner: Chicago Transit Authority
- Line: Cermak Branch
- Platforms: 1 island platform
- Tracks: 2
- Connections: CTA Buses; Pace Buses

Construction
- Structure type: At-grade
- Accessible: Yes

History
- Opened: December 16, 1907; 118 years ago
- Rebuilt: 1978; 48 years ago
- Former names: 48th Avenue

Passengers
- 2025: 258,487 ▼11.9%

Services
Preceding station	Chicago "L"	Following station
54th/Cermak Terminus	Pink Line	Kostner toward Loop (Clark/Lake)
Former services
Preceding station	Chicago "L"	Following station
54th/Cermak Terminus	Blue Line Cermak branch	Kostner toward O'Hare
50th Avenue Closed 1978 toward Oak Park	Douglas branch	Kenton Closed 1951 toward Marshfield
Track layout
Location

Cicero is a station on the Chicago Transit Authority's 'L' system, serving the Pink Line. The station was the site of an accident in 1979 in which a train derailed and hit the station, stopping just short of the ticket agent's booth. The station is located in Cicero, Illinois.

== Bus connections ==
CTA

- 21 Cermak
- 54 Cicero
- 54B South Cicero
- N60 Blue Island/26th Night Bus (Owl Service – overnight only)

Pace

- 302 Ogden/Stanley (Monday–Saturday only)
- 392 Green Line Cicero CTA/UPS Hodgkins (weekday UPS shifts only)
