= Kostner station (CTA Pink Line) =

Chicago rapid transit station

Kostner 4400W 2100S
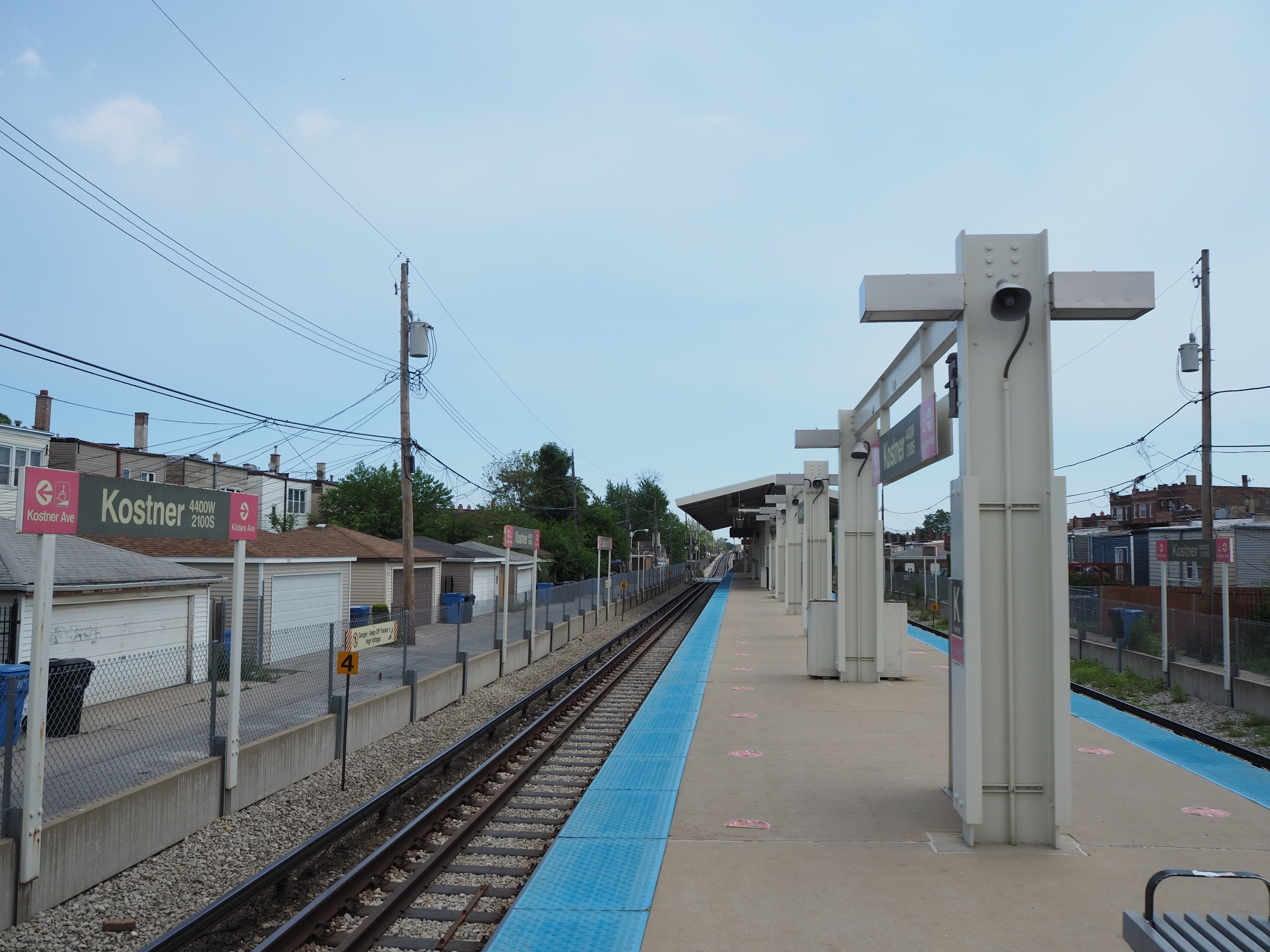

General information
- Location: 2019 South Kostner Avenue; Chicago, Illinois 60623
- Coordinates: 41.853751°N 87.733258°W
- Owner: Chicago Transit Authority
- Line: Cermak Branch
- Platforms: 1 island platform
- Tracks: 2

Construction
- Structure type: At-grade
- Accessible: Yes

History
- Opened: May 22, 1907; 119 years ago (as Kildare station)
- Rebuilt: 2002–2003; 23 years ago (renamed Kostner station)
- Former names: Kildare

Passengers
- 2025: 91,181 ▼4.6%

Services
Preceding station	Chicago "L"	Following station
Cicero toward 54th/Cermak	Pink Line	Pulaski toward Loop (Clark/Lake)
Former services
Preceding station	Chicago "L"	Following station
Cicero toward 54th/Cermak	Blue Line Cermak branch	Pulaski toward O'Hare
Kenton Closed 1951 toward Oak Park	Douglas branch	Pulaski toward Marshfield
Track layout
Location

Kostner, formerly known as Kildare, is an 'L' station on the CTA's Pink Line. It is located in the K-Town neighborhood of the North Lawndale community area, often just referred to as Lawndale. Kostner station was originally opened as Kildare. During reconstruction in 2003, its primary entrance was moved one block west to Kostner Avenue and the Kildare entrance became an auxiliary entrance.

This is the first outbound Pink Line station to be located at-grade; immediately to the east of the station, the tracks begin ramping up to an elevated structure and remain elevated for the remainder of the distance to the Loop.

== Structure ==
The station consists of a single at-grade island platform. There are two entrances: a full-service entrance with ticket vending machines at Kostner Avenue and a smaller farecard-only entrance at Kildare Avenue. There is also a canopy extending from each entrance, while the center of the platform is open without any canopy.

== Notes ==
The Kostner station is, on average, the least used "L" station per year.
