= James Patton (baseball) =

American baseball player

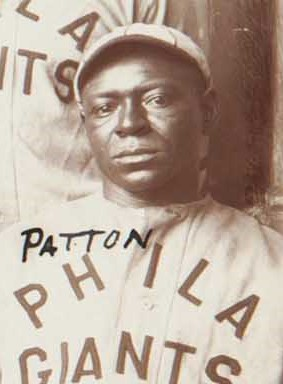
- Pitcher
- Threw: Left

Negro league baseball debut
- 1907, for the Birmingham Giants

Last appearance
- 1913, for the French Lick Plutos

Teams
- Birmingham Giants (1907–1908); Philadelphia Giants (1909); French Lick Plutos (1913)

James Patton was an American Negro league pitcher between 1909 and 1913.

Patton made his Negro leagues debut in 1907 with the Birmingham Giants and played for Birmingham again the following season. He went on to play for the Philadelphia Giants in 1909 and the French Lick Plutos in 1913.
