= King–Nash House =

Historic house in Illinois, United States

- Patrick J. King House
- U.S. National Register of Historic Places
- Chicago Landmark
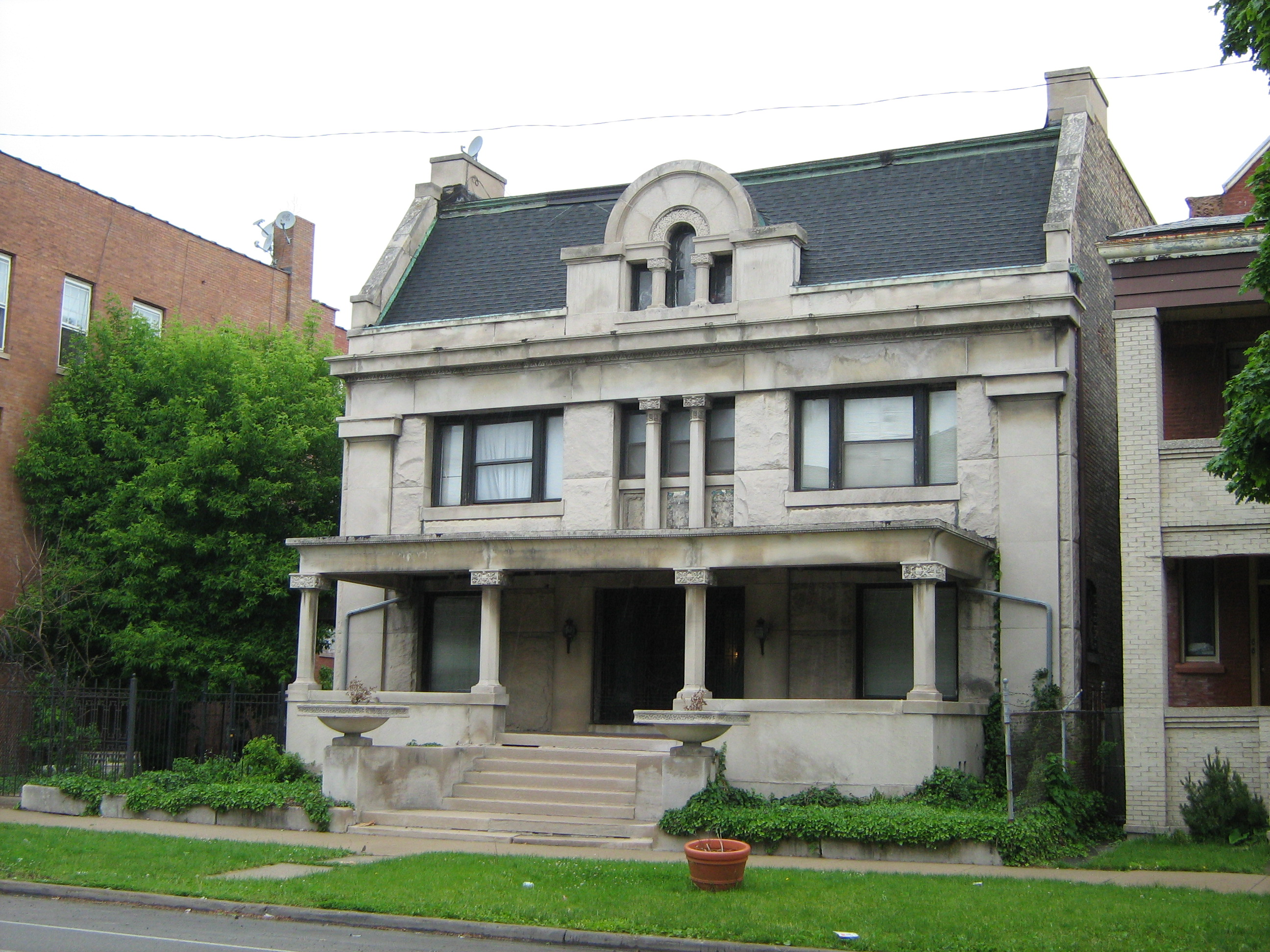
- King–Nash (Patrick J. King) House

- Location within Chicago metropolitan area Location within Illinois Location within the United States
- Location: 3234 W. Washington Blvd., Chicago, Illinois
- Coordinates: 41°52′58.33″N 87°42′26.89″W
- Built: 1901
- Architect: George W. Maher
- Architectural style: Late 19th And Early 20th Century American Movements, Prairie School
- NRHP reference No.: 83000311

Significant dates
- Added to NRHP: February 10, 1983
- Designated CHICL: February 10, 1988

The King–Nash House, also known as Patrick J. King House, is a combination of Sullivanesque, Colonial Revival, and Prairie styles house in the East Garfield Park area of Chicago, Illinois, United States. The house was built in 1901 by George W. Maher for Patrick J. King. From 1925 until his death in 1943, it was home to Chicago political boss Patrick Nash.

It was listed on the U.S. National Register of Historic Places in 1983. It was designated a Chicago Landmark on February 10, 1988.

== Gallery ==
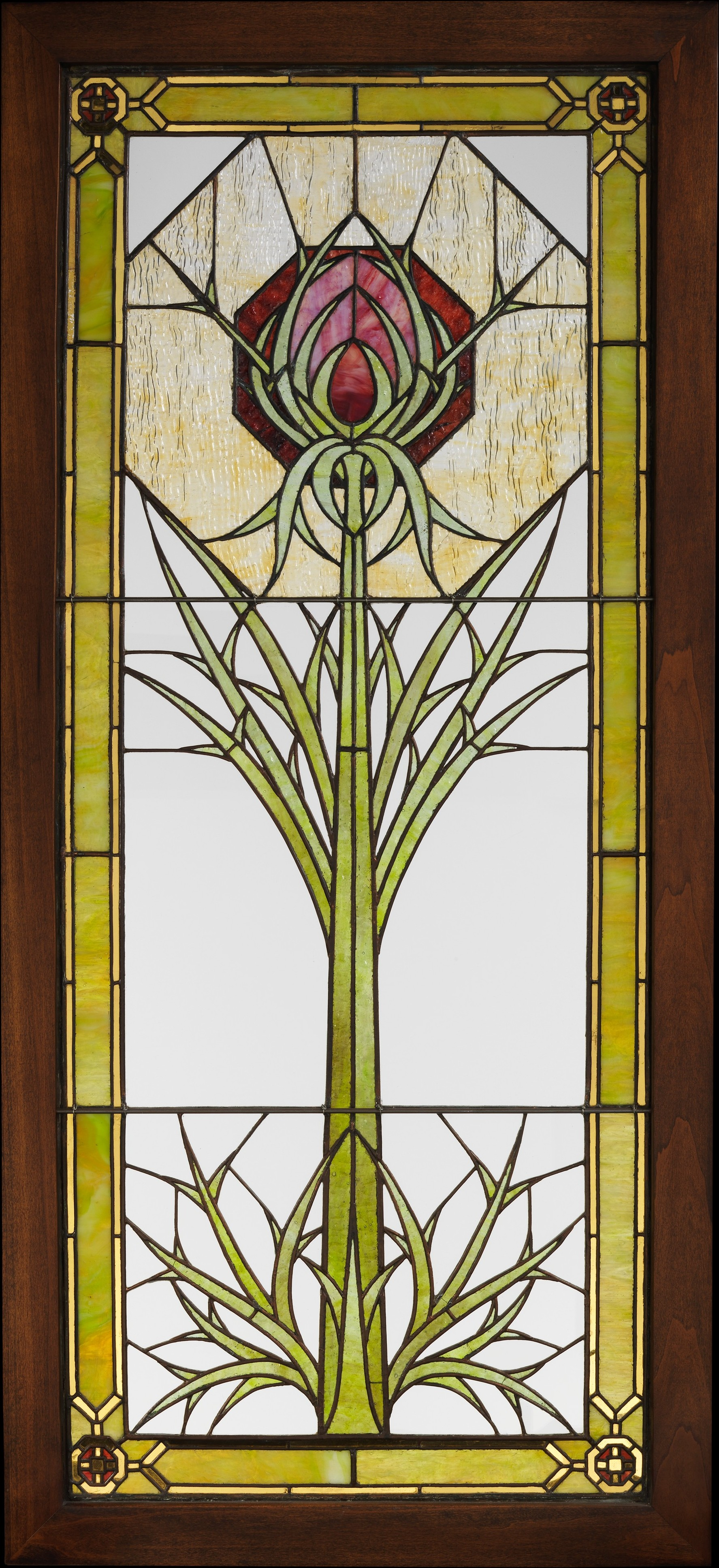
Louis J. Millet's thistle-designed window from the James A. Patton House designed by George Washington Maher, now in the collection of the Metropolitan Museum of Art in New York.

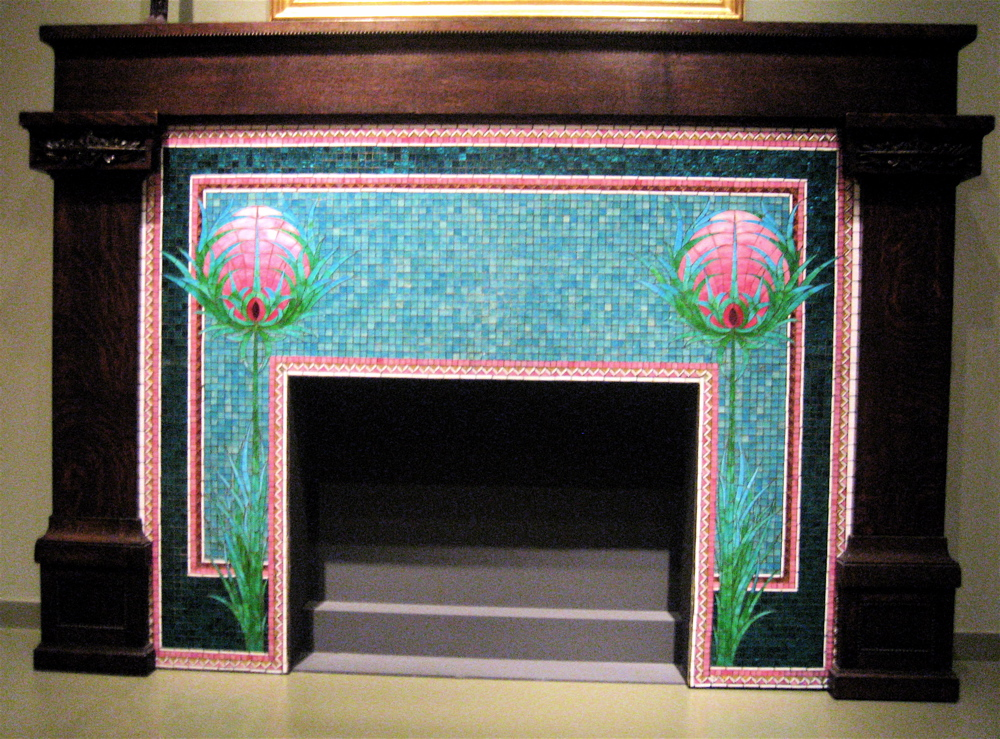
Fireplace Surround from the Patrick J King House in Chicago now at LACMA
