= James Paton (museologist) =

James Paton (15 April, 1843, Auchtergaven – 1921) was a Scottish museologist who played a significant role in the creation of the Kelvingrove Art Gallery and Museum.
