= James A. Patten =

American businessman and politician

James A. Patten (1852-1928), Illinois commodities speculator and financier.

James A. Patten (1852–1928) was an American commodities speculator, financier, and politician. The mayor of Evanston from 1901 to 1905, Patten is best remembered as a leading financier of the Gilded Age.

== Biography ==
James A. Patten was born at Freeland Corners, Illinois. He attended the common schools and was early a clerk, a farmer, and an employee in the Illinois State department of grain inspection (1874–78), whence he learned the details and operation of the grain commission business. For 32 years from 1878 to 1910 he was a member of several firms.

Patten was the mayor of Evanston from 1901 to 1905. He was prominently before the public in connection with an attempt to corner the wheat crop in 1909. It was alleged that Patten himself secured control of more than 23,000,000 bushels of wheat, and that these holdings, together with those of his associates, were sufficient to force the price of wheat and flour up, while he gained enormous profits. He also operated his business in Liverpool where in 1911 on a trip to the Manchester Exchange his appearance caused a riot.

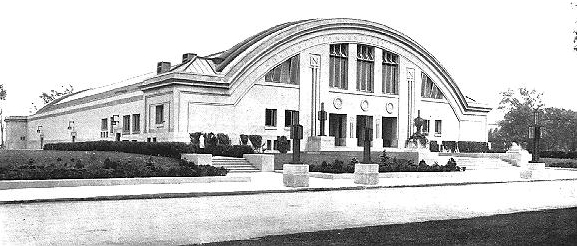
Patten Gymnasium, Northwestern University, 1908 (demolished)

In addition to being mayor of Evanston, Illinois, Patten was also a trustee of Northwestern University where he donated funds to build the original Patten Gymnasium. The architect of the gym was George Maher who had designed Patten's house in Evanston.

Patten died in 1928.

== See also ==
- George Washington Maher —architect of the Patten House and the original Patten Gymnasium.
