= Max Demián =

Max Demián (born February 14, 1986) is a Chicago-based recording artist and songwriter also known as “Homeboy Beautiful”. His recent credits include The Mind of Delilah directed by Amir George, Heather directed by Melissa Lawrenz, and Bowser Makes a Movie directed by Toby Ross.

Demián's work has also been seen at Albany Park Theater Project, About Face Theatre, Chicago Tonight, Art Beat Chicago, Vittum Theater, Museum of Contemporary Art and many more.

International credits include American Idol Season 1, and was also one of six local artist chosen as the face for Lambda Legal's 'Out, Safe, and Respected' campaign.

== Early life ==
Demián was born in Mexico City, the son of Soledad (Aguirre), a writer, designer, and painter; and Max Armendariz Winfield, a computer technician. Demian's mother is Mexican and his father was a Catholic of Irish and Mexican descent. Demián moved to Chicago at the age of one. Demián attended grade school at the Casimir Pulaski Community Academy (a progressive K–8 school in Chicago) and attended high school at Roosevelt Highschool before transferring to Lake Forest Academy (an elite private school on Chicago's North Shore with a strong math and science program).

== Career ==
Max Demián began creating original theater based on the true stories of people in the Albany Park neighborhood. Max first arrived at APTP on June 1, 2001, as an ensemble member, when he was a fourteen-year-old freshman at Roosevelt High School.

== Awards ==
- Recognized by the Chicago Free Press for Performance at the First Latina/o Pride Parade—7/8/06
