= Ravenswood Manor Historic District =

Historic district in Illinois, United States

Coordinates: 41.9653°N 87.7009°W

- U.S. National Register of Historic Places
- U.S. Historic district
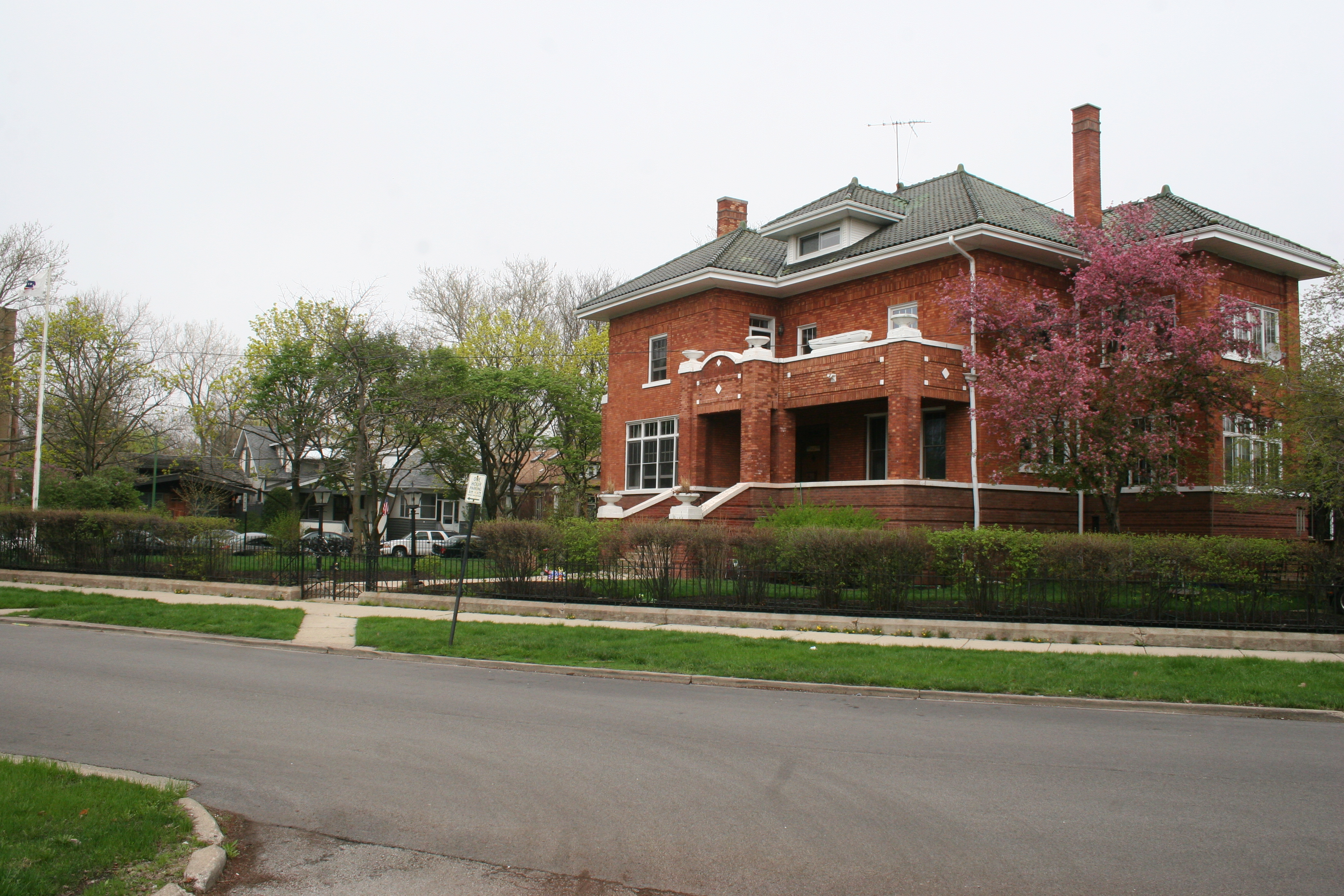
- View north from the 4600 block of Manor Avenue

- Location within Chicago metropolitan area Location within Illinois Location within the United States
- Location: Between Sacramento Ave., N. branch of the Chicago river, and alleys S. of Lawrence Ave. and N. of Montrose Ave., Chicago, Illinois
- Area: 60 acres (24 ha)
- Architect: Harmon, William Elmer
- Architectural style: Late 19th And 20th Century Revivals, Late 19th And Early 20th Century American Movements
- NRHP reference No.: 08000836
- Added to NRHP: September 05, 2008

The Ravenswood Manor Historic District is a historic district in the Albany Park community area of North Side, Chicago, Illinois. It is bordered by the Chicago River on the East, and by the alley south of Lawrence Avenue on the North, Sacramento Avenue on the West, and the alley North of Montrose Avenue on the south.

Ravenswood Manor is a primarily residential neighborhood that was developed during the early twentieth century. It contains many bungalows, and some of the homes along the river have their own docks.

One of the most famous recent residents has been former Illinois governor Rod Blagojevich.

The district was added to the National Register of Historic Places on September 5, 2008.

== Development and architecture ==
Ravenswood Manor was developed in the early twentieth century by real-estate developer William E. Harmon, who promoted it as the “First Suburb Beautiful.” The development was planned with tree-lined streets, green spaces and access to the North Branch of the Chicago River. Its housing includes numerous Arts and Crafts bungalows characterised by low-pitched roofs, broad overhanging eaves, exposed rafters and the use of brick, stone and tile.

== See also ==
- National Register of Historic Places listings in North Side Chicago
