= Ronan Park =

Ronan Park refers to recreational areas in:

- Albany Park, Chicago, Illinois
- Dorchester, Boston, Massachusetts
