= Albany Park Theater Project =

Albany Park Theater Project, also known as APTP, is a multiethnic youth theater ensemble based in the Albany Park neighborhood of Chicago. The mission of the theater is to inspire people to envision a more just and beautiful world by dedicating time to art, youth, and social justice. All of APTP's theater is original, devised together by adult theater professionals and youth artists, and is based on the gathered stories and interviews of individuals throughout the city of Chicago and most often in the Albany Park community. Albany Park is the United States' third most diverse neighborhood, is a large port of entry for immigrants from Latin America, Asia, Africa, and Eastern Europe, and is widely working class and low income.

== Founding and history ==
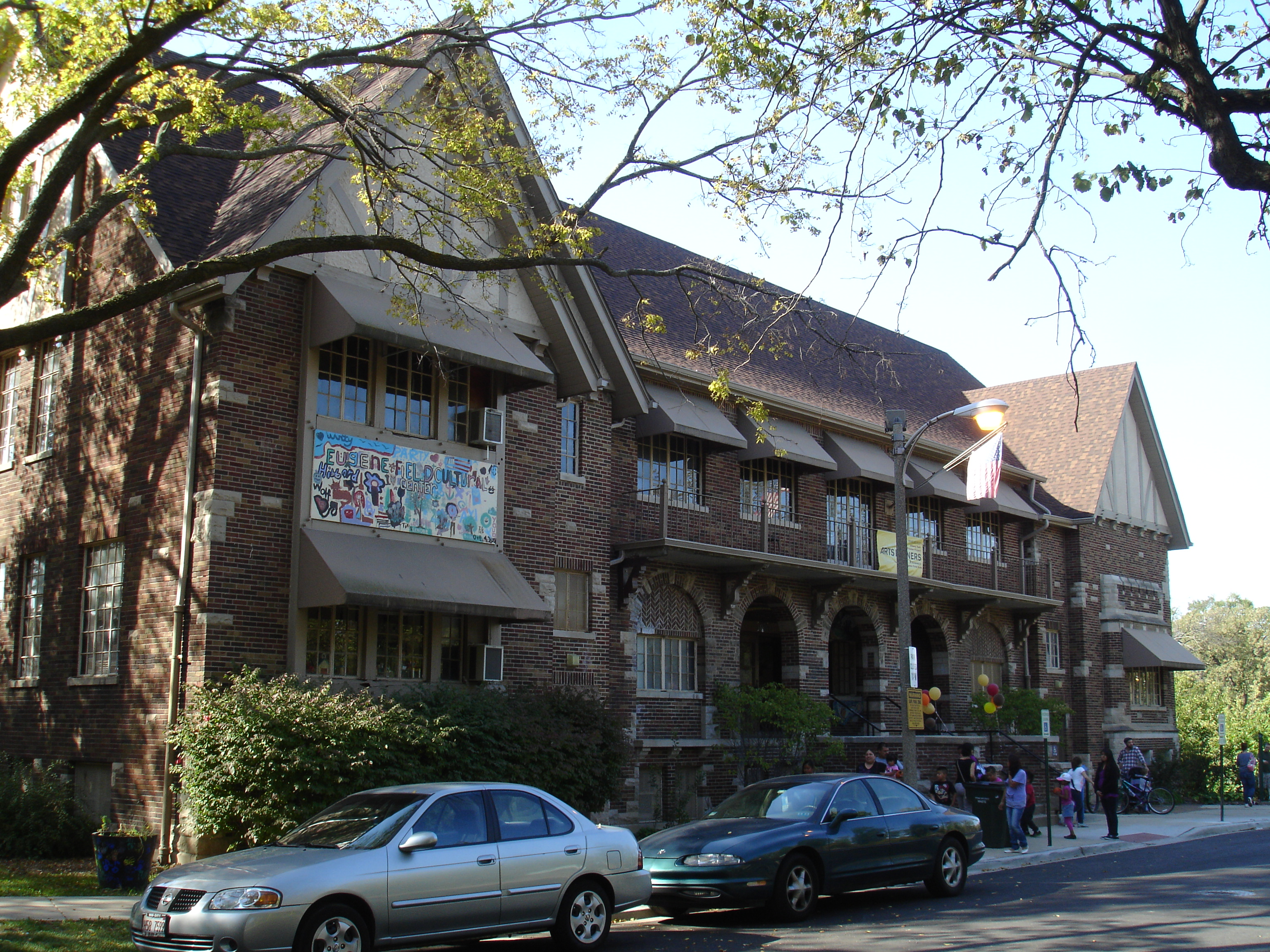
Eugene Field Park, home of Albany Park Theater Project.

Albany Park Theater Project was cofounded in April 1997 by David Feiner and the late Laura Wiley. Moving about the North Side in the vicinity of Lawrence Avenue, APTP would move from Horner Park, to a church basement, to Jensen Park, before finally settling in 2001 in its current home is at Eugene Field Park, where APTP is a Chicago Park District Arts Partner in Residence. Through weekly workshops at the park as well as workshops at Roosevelt High School, APTP recruited teens without theater experience between the ages of 13 and 20, and trained them through theater games, reading, and more to promote their skills as youth artists. APTP's first production performed at Eugene Field Park was 2001's Matches in the Dark. After this production, APTP began to receive attention from Chicago press and theater critics and writers such as the Chicago Tribune and Chicago Sun-Times. When APTP's first group of high school seniors were about to graduate, APTP began a college counseling program that has gone to send over 90% of its participants to college, where 80% graduate by age 24 (seven times the national rate for low-income students). In 2015, APTP received a $100,000 grant from the suburban Chicago chapter of Impact100 to create a full scale version of Learning Curve, an immersive theater production about Chicago Public Schools created with nationally-acclaimed Third Rail Projects of Brooklyn, New York. In February 2016, APTP received a $400,000 grant from the MacArthur Foundation and in July 2016, Learning Curve had its world premiere, receiving wide acclaim and national attention as the first large-scale, immersive theater show devised and performed by teen artists. APTP has had a longterm relationship with the internationally acclaimed Goodman Theatre, Chicago's oldest currently active nonprofit theater organization. Board members of the theater include Northwestern University professor and actor Henry Godinez and former Executive Vice President, Global Government Relations for Royal Dutch Shell Roxanne Decyk.

== Ensemble ==
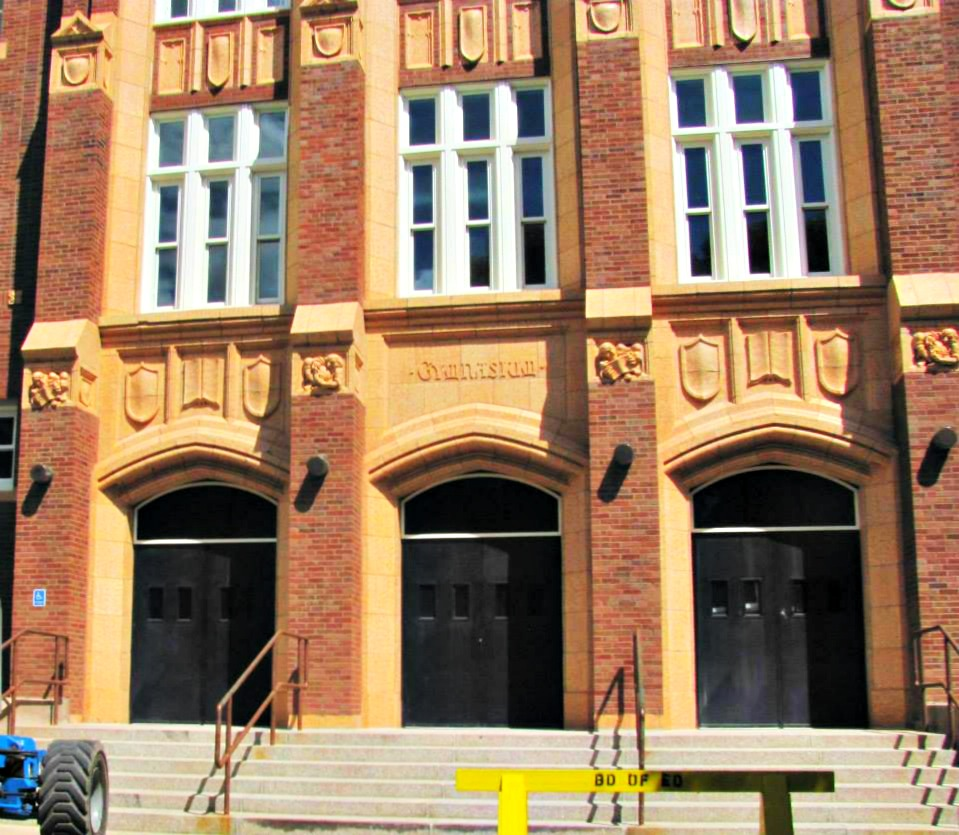
Roosevelt High School, located in the Albany Park neighborhood.

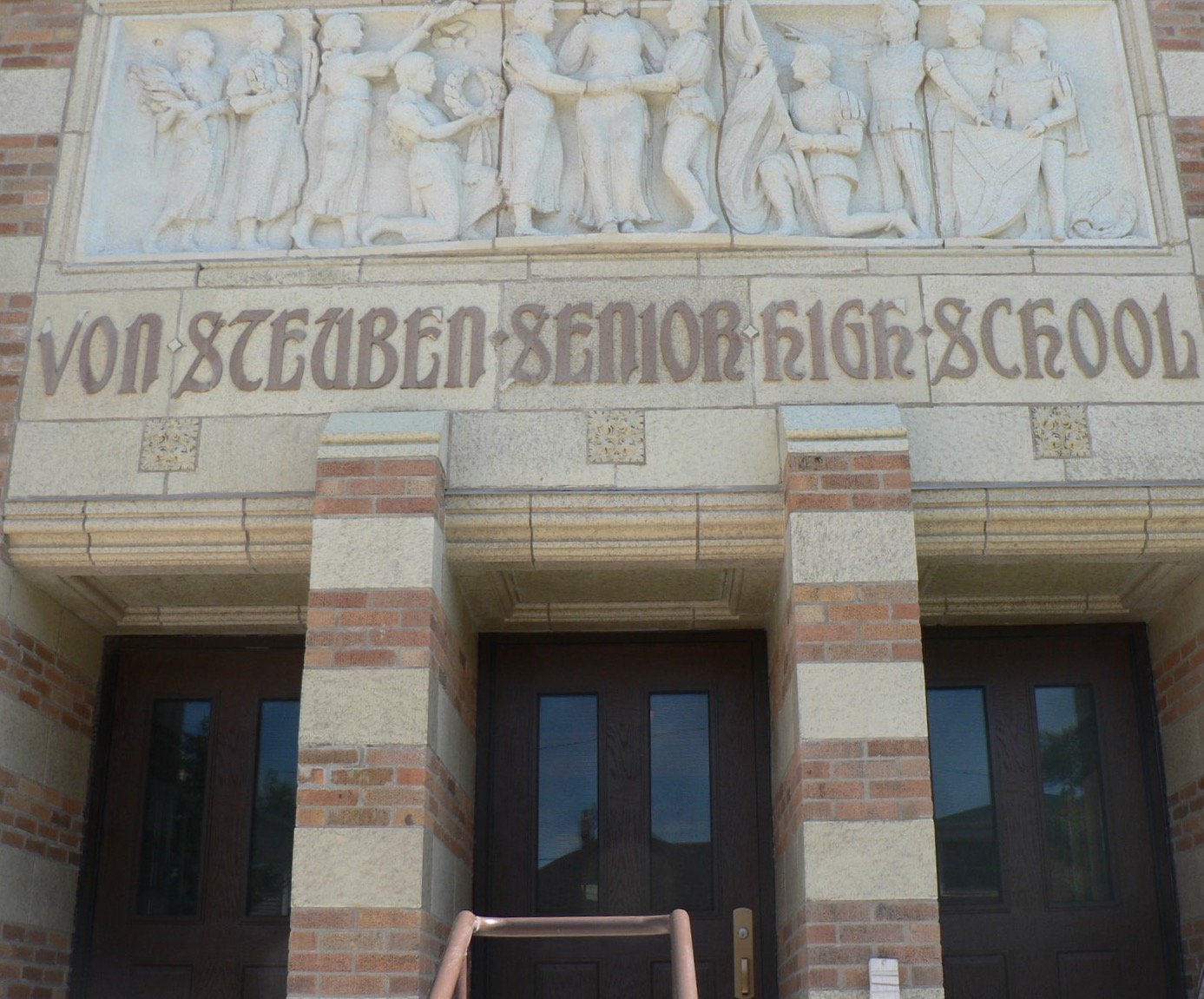
Von Steuben High School, located at the boundary of the Albany Park and North Park neighborhoods.

The ensemble consists each year of about 30 youth artists between the ages of 13 and 20. There is no audition process or application, however all ensemble members do live in or go to school in the Albany Park neighborhood. Many ensemble members joined APTP through the day programs at Albany Park Multicultural Academy and Volta Elementary School, two neighborhood Chicago Public Schools, as well as Roosevelt High School, Von Steuben Metropolitan High School, and Amundsen High School. The ensemble also has tutoring and a college access and success program available to them, as well as a health and food program that provides meals throughout the year.

== Productions ==
More than 19 pieces of original theater have been devised at Albany Park Theater Project.

- Learning Curve, 2016. Ellen Gates Starr High School.
- Learning Curve Workshop, 2015. Laura Wiley Theater at Eugene Field Park.
- Feast, 2015. Goodman Theatre.
- God's Work, 2014. Goodman Theatre.
- Home/Land, 2012-2013. Laura Wiley Theater at Eugene Field Park and Goodman Theatre.
- I Will Kiss These Walls, 2013. Laura Wiley Theater at Eugene Field Park.
- Feast, 2010. Laura Wiley Theater at Eugene Field Park.
- Remember Me Like This, 2009. Laura Wiley Theater at Eugene Field Park.
- Aqui Estoy, 2007-2008. Laura Wiley Theater at Eugene Field Park and Goodman Theatre.
- God's Work, 2006. Laura Wiley Theater at Eugene Field Park.
- Saffron, 2004-2005. Museum of Contemporary Art, Chicago Humanities Festival, Laura Wiley Theater at Eugene Field Park, Storefront Theater
- Aqui Estoy, 2003-2004. Laura Wiley Theater at Eugene Field Park.
- Too Girl to Comprehend, 2002. Laura Wiley Theater at Eugene Field Park.
- Number Nine, 2002. Laura Wiley Theater at Eugene Field Park.
- Leaves Growing Trees, 2001-2002, Laura Wiley Theater at Eugene Field Park and Vittum Theater.
- Matches in the Dark, 2001, Laura Wiley Theater at Eugene Field Park.
- Numerous productions prior to 2001 at assorted venues throughout Albany Park and Chicago.

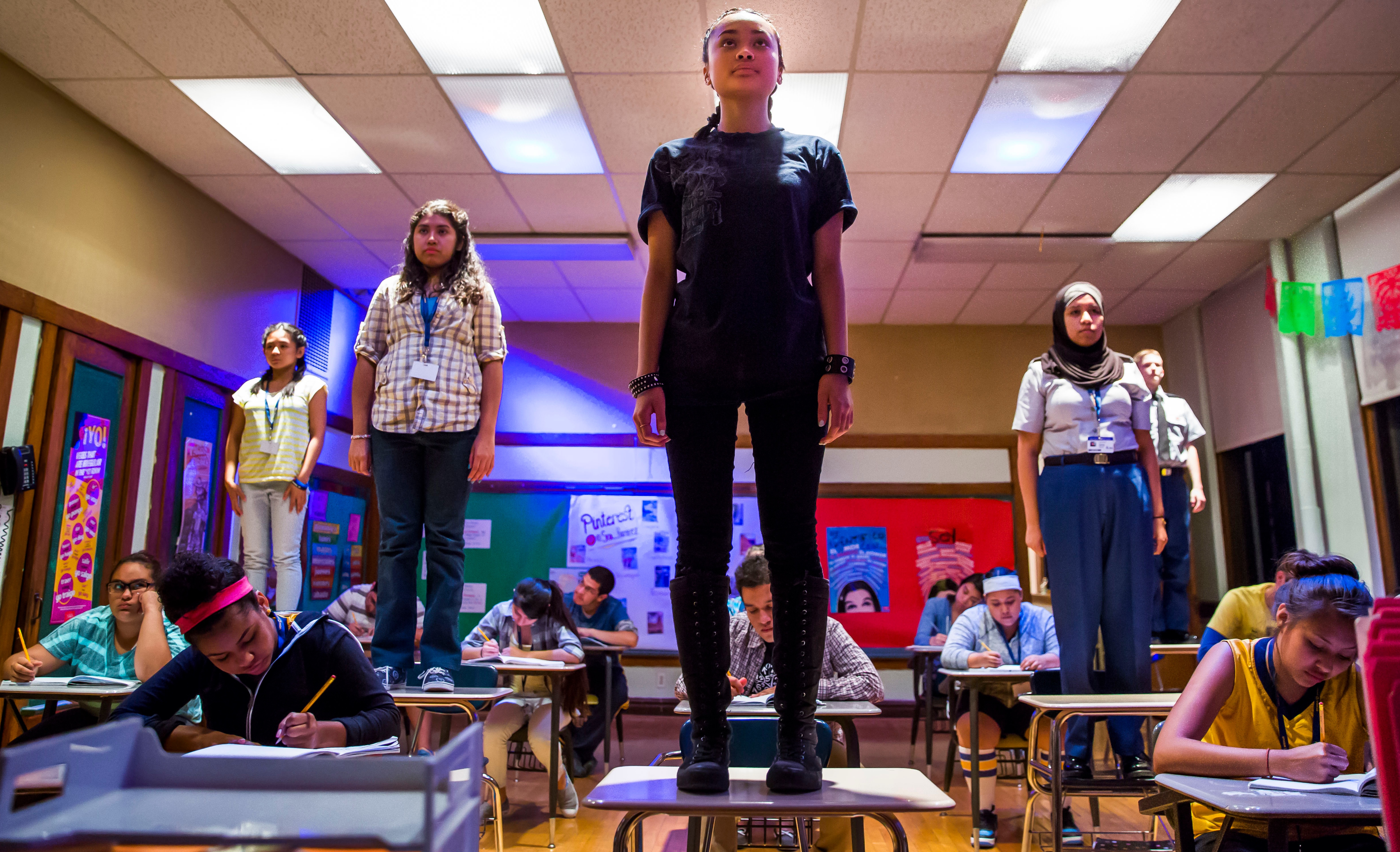
An image from APTP's 2016 production of Learning Curve.
