= Albany Park, Chicago =

Community area in Chicago, Illinois

Albany Park
- Community area
- Community Area 14 - Albany Park
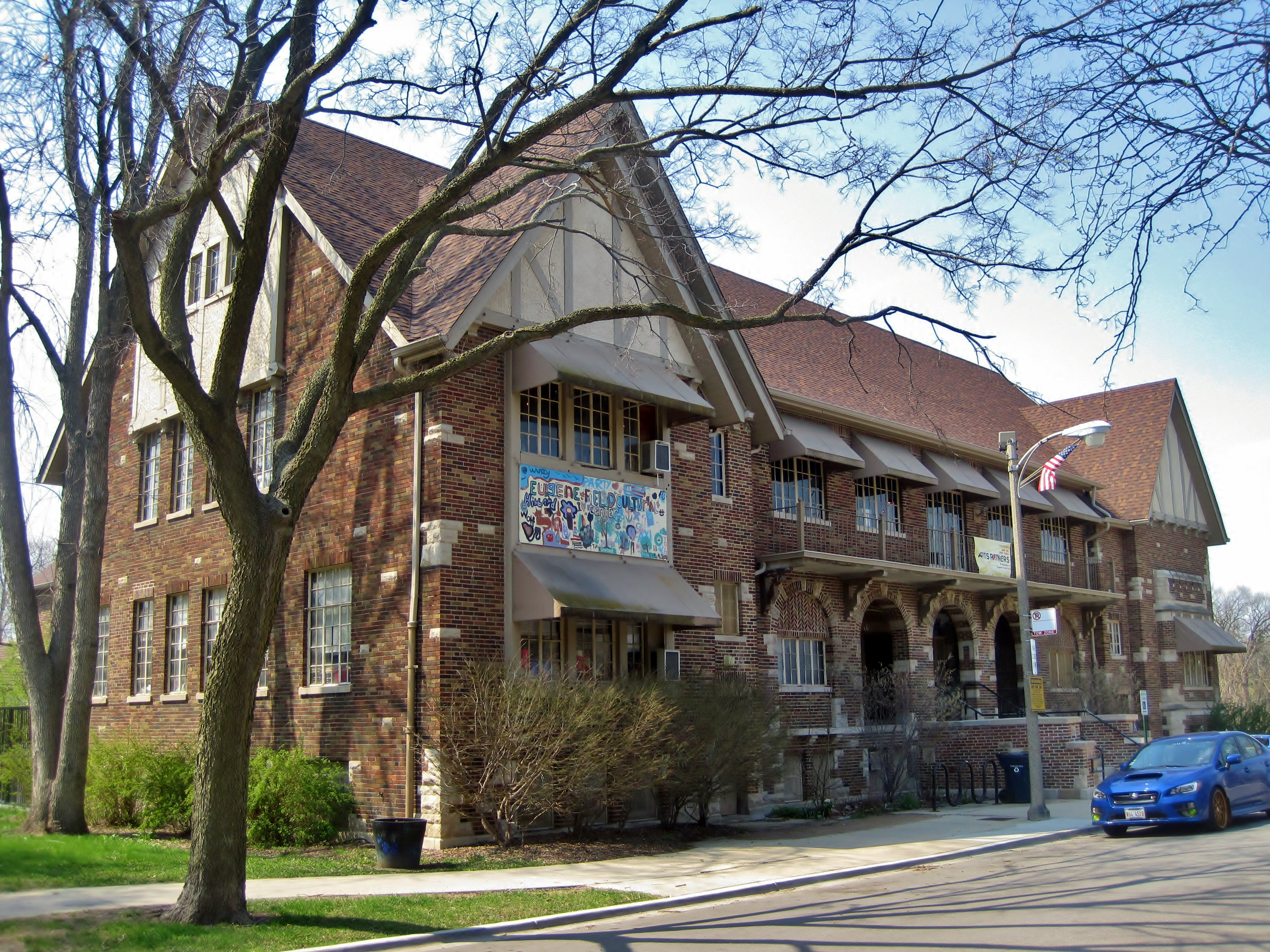
- Eugene Field Park house

- Location within the city of Chicago
- Coordinates: 41°58.2′N 87°43.2′W
- Country: United States
- State: Illinois
- County: Cook
- City: Chicago
- Named for: Albany, New York
- Neighborhoods: list: Albany Park; Mayfair; North Mayfair; Ravenswood Manor

Area
  - Total: 1.93 sq mi (5.00 km^{2})

Population (2024)
  - Total: 45,538
  - Density: 23,600/sq mi (9,110/km^{2})

Demographics 2024
  - White: 34.2%
  - Black: 3.5%
  - Hispanic: 43.0%
  - Asian: 15.1%
  - Other: 4.2%
- Time zone: UTC-6 (CST)
  - Summer (DST): UTC-5 (CDT)
- ZIP Codes: parts of 60625, 60630
- Median household income 2019: $61,759
- Source: U.S. Census, Record Information Services

Albany Park (/ˈɔːlbəni/ AWL-bə-nee) is one of the 77 community areas of Chicago in Illinois, United States. Located on the Northwest Side of Chicago with the North Branch of the Chicago River forming its east and north boundaries, it includes the ethnically diverse Albany Park neighborhood, with one of the highest percentages of foreign-born residents of any Chicago neighborhood.

Although the majority of those foreign-born residents are from Latin America, mostly from Mexico (especially from the state of Michoacán), Guatemala, and Ecuador, substantial numbers are from the Philippines, India, Korea, Cambodia, Somalia, Serbia, Croatia, Bosnia, Romania, Pakistan and the Middle East (especially Iraq, Iran, and Lebanon). Over 40 different languages are spoken in its public schools.

Due to the diverse population and immigrant population attraction, the population of the neighborhood increased by 16.5% during the 1990s.

== History ==
The area was settled in 1893 when several investors purchased land in the area as areas closer to downtown became more heavily populated. DeLancy Louderback from Albany, New York was one of the investors and chose the name.

The developers added electric streetcars in 1896 and the Northwestern Elevated Railroad extended the Ravenswood branch to the Kimball terminal on December 14, 1907. This led to a building boom in the area. At this point in development, the north branch of the Chicago River meandered greatly, and therefore the Chicago Sanitary District straightened the river. This expanded and defined property lines and sewage in Albany Park.

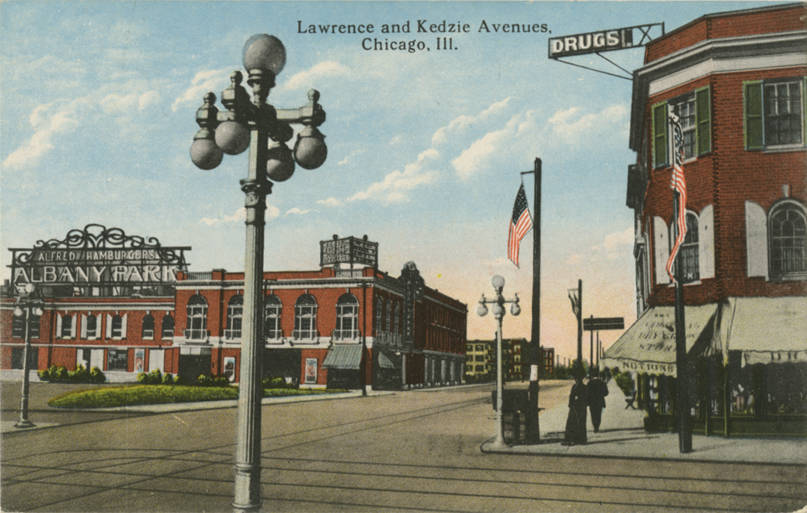
Intersection of Lawrence Avenue and Kedzie Avenue in 1915.

By 1930, the population of the neighborhood reached 55,000, and many schools, religious institutions, and parks opened. Haugan Elementary School became the biggest elementary school in the city and Roosevelt High School's overcrowding led to Von Steuben Elementary being converted into a high school. Residents began moving to northern suburbs after World War II and the population declined quickly, leaving many stores uninhabited and properties empty. It wasn't until the 1970s, when a new immigration wave from Asia (mainly Korea) and Central America began to increase the population again. Today, Albany Park is the most diverse neighborhood in the city, and one of the most diverse in the entire country.

== Neighborhoods ==
The traditional neighborhoods within the official community are (including rough boundaries):

- Albany Park: North: North Branch of the Chicago River (about 5100 N); South: Montrose Avenue (4400 N): East: North Branch of the River (about 3000 W); West: Pulaski Road (4000 W).
- Mayfair: North: Lawrence Avenue (4800 N); South: Cullom Avenue (4300 N); East: Pulaski Road (4000 W); West: Lamon Avenue (4900 W).
- North Mayfair: North: Bryn Mawr Avenue (5600 N); South: Lawrence Avenue (4800 N); East: Pulaski Road (4000 W); West: Lamon Avenue (4900 W).
- Ravenswood Manor: North: Lawrence Avenue (4800 N); South: Montrose Avenue (4400 N); East: the Chicago River; West: Sacramento Avenue.

Immediately to the north, in North Park, lie Northeastern Illinois University, North Park University, and the Bohemian National Cemetery.

=== Korean commercial district ===
The neighborhood was once known as the "Koreatown" of Chicago, beginning in the 1980s. The majority of Korean shops in Albany Park were found on Lawrence Avenue (4800 North) between Kedzie Avenue (3200 West) and Pulaski Road (4000 West), and many are still there. This particular section of Lawrence Avenue has been officially nicknamed "Seoul Drive" by the city of Chicago because of the multitude of Korean-owned enterprises on the street. Although many of the Korean Americans in the neighborhood have been moving to the north suburbs in recent years, it still retains some Korean flavor. Previously there was a Korean festival in nearby North Park, but was last held in the late 2010s. The neighborhood was home to a Korean radio station (1330 AM) before the station moved to Des Plaines, and then Wheeling, IL, before shutting down in 2023. Albany Park was also once home to two Korean-language newspapers, but these have since moved to the suburbs. There are still some Korean businesses interspersed among the newer Mexican bakeries and Middle Eastern grocery stores. However, the Korean diaspora has increasingly left Albany Park in recent years for other cities or suburbs such as Niles and Glenview. From 1997 to 2017, the Korean business presence on Lawrence Avenue fell from 158 to 50. This loss has been attributed to shifts in immigration policy decreasing the number of visas allocated to Korean immigrants, as well as pursuit of economic opportunities outside of Chicago.

== Demographics ==
Historical population
Census	Pop.	Note	%±
1930	55,577		—
1940	56,692		2.0%
1950	52,995		−6.5%
1960	49,450		−6.7%
1970	47,092		−4.8%
1980	46,075		−2.2%
1990	49,501		7.4%
2000	57,655		16.5%
2010	51,542		−10.6%
2020	48,396		−6.1%

After Jefferson Township was purchased and annexed by the city of Chicago and development began in the area that became Albany Park, immigrant German and Swedish farmers flocked to land. Many built their own homes. At the beginning of the 20th century, more upwardly mobile Russian Jews arrived in Albany Park to escape the crowded conditions of the very-heavily Jewish Near West Side/Maxwell Street area. This pattern continued as other residents in other Jewish-populated neighborhoods such as Lawndale and parts of West Town followed suit. These families began moving to northern suburbs such as Skokie after World War II. Starting in the 1970s, immigrants from Asia and Latin America, mainly Korea and Guatemala, began moving into the neighborhood's largely vacant properties and storefronts. Immigration continued from all around the world, and by the 1990s, there were large populations from the Philippines, Iran, Iraq, Lebanon, Poland, Vietnam, Burma, Cambodia, Mexico (largely from the state of Michoacán), Ecuador, and Colombia. Since the 1992-1995 war in Yugoslavia, roughly 1,200 Serbians who lived in Croatia resettled in Albany Park along with more than 4,000 Bosnians of all three backgrounds. Into the 2000s, the western part of the neighborhood became home to a substantial number of Indian and East African immigrants.

As of 2019, the community area has 49,806 residents. The racial makeup of the community area is 45% Hispanic/Latino, 32.2% White/non-Hispanic, 14.8% Asian/non-Hispanic, 4.9% Black/non-Hispanic, and 3% other.

== Transportation ==
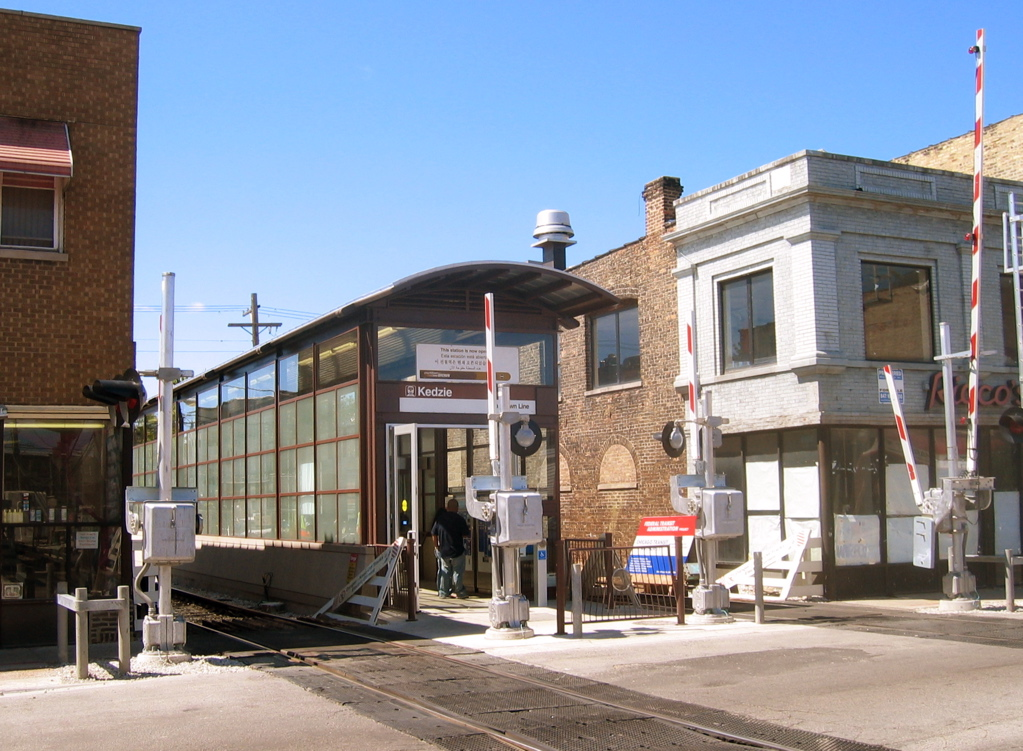
Kedzie Station

The Chicago Transit Authority's Brown Line terminates at Lawrence and Kimball Avenues. Albany Park is accessible through the Kimball, Kedzie and Francisco stations of the Brown Line, the nearby Montrose Blue Line station, as well as by the Edens expressway (Interstate 94).

Metra's Milwaukee District/ North Line has a station in Mayfair.

CTA bus routes in Albany Park include: 53 Pulaski, 78 Montrose, 81 Lawrence, 82 Kimball-Homan, 92 Foster, and 93 California/Dodge.

== Politics ==
Albany Park is divided between 3 wards; the 33rd, the 35th and the 39th. The wards are represented by Rossana Rodriguez-Sanchez in the 33rd ward, Anthony Quezada in the 35th ward and Samantha Nugent in the 39th ward.

It is similarly divided in the state legislature. In the Illinois Senate it is represented by John Cullerton, Graciela Guzmán, Ira Silverstein and Heather Steans. In the Illinois House of Representatives it is represented by Jaime Andrade Jr., Ann Williams, John C. D'Amico and Greg Harris. On the Cook County Board of Commissioners, it is represented by Luis Arroyo Jr.

In 2016, Albany Park cast 10,590 votes for Hillary Clinton and 1,558 votes for Donald Trump. Four years earlier, Albany Park cast 9,304 votes for Barack Obama and 1,950 votes for Mitt Romney.

== Schools ==
Public Schools – Chicago Public Schools operates public schools

- Hibbard Elementary School
- Haugan Elementary School
- Budlong Elementary School
- Newton Bateman Elementary School
- North River Elementary
- Waters Elementary
- Volta Elementary
- Chappell Elementary
- ASPIRA at Haugan Middle School
- Haugan Middle Campus
- Albany Park Multicultural Academy
- Roosevelt High School
- Von Steuben Metropolitan Science Center
- Edison Regional Gifted Center
- Global Village
- John M. Palmer Elementary

Private Schools

- North Shore Junior Academy
- Little Angels
- Telshe Yeshiva
- Gateway to Learning
- St. Matthias Transfiguration
- St. Edward School
- Eagle's Wings Urban Academy

Universities

- Northeastern Illinois University
- North Park University

== Parks and recreation facilities ==
- Buffalo Playlot Park
- Eugene Field Park
- Gompers Park
- Jensen Park
- Kiwanis Park
- LaPointe Park
- North Mayfair Playlot Park
- Ravenswood Manor Park
- River Park
- Ronan Park

== Culture ==
The Chicago Shimpo previously had its offices in Albany Park. It is now headquartered in Arlington Heights.

== Government agencies ==
Libraries

- Albany Park Branch: 3401 W. Foster Avenue
- Mayfair Branch: 4400 W. Lawrence Avenue

Police Department

- 4650 N. Pulaski Road - 17th District

Fire Department

- Engine Co. 110: 2322 West Foster Avenue
- Engine Co. 124: 4426 North Kedzie Avenue
- Engine Co. 69: 4017 North Tripp Avenue

Marine Corps

- U.S. Marine Corps Reserve, 2nd Battalion 24th Marines: 3034-60 W. Foster Avenue

== Community gardens ==
- Jensen Community Gardens
- Drake Community Garden
- Turtle Park Community Garden
- Global Gardens Community Garden
- Global Garden Refugee Training Farm

== Active neighborhood organizations ==
- 2nd Story
- Albany Park Autonomous Center
- Carole Robertson Center for Learning (previously Albany Park Community Center.)
- Albany Park Chamber of Commerce
- Albany Park Neighbors
- Albany Park Theater Project
- American Indian Center
- American Legion
- Anthem Church
- Autonomous Tenants Union
- Cambodian Association of Illinois
- Christ Church
- Church of the Beloved Albany Park
- Communities United (formerly Albany Park Neighborhood Council)
- Foresight Design Initiative
- Friedman Place
- Full Gospel Chicago Church
- Hanul Family Alliance
- Healthy Albany Park Coalition
- Irish American Heritage Center
- King Oscar Lodge
- Korean American Community Services
- Latino Union Worker Center
- Lawrence Avenue Development Corporation
- Lawrence Hall Youth Services
- Mayfair Civic Organization
- Mexico-US Solidarity Network
- New Life Community Church
- North Branch Projects
- North Mayfair Improvement Association
- North Park Friendship Center
- North River Commission
- People of East Albany Park (PEAP) neighborhood organization
- Ravenswood Manor Improvement Association
- River Park Advisory Council
- Svithiod Independent Order
- Territory Albany Park
- True North Christian Fellowship
- Young Women's Empowerment Project
- West River Park Improvement Association
- West River Park Neighbors
- World Relief Chicago

== Notable people ==
- Rod Blagojevich (born 1956), 40th Governor of Illinois (2003–2009). He resides on West Sunnyside Avenue in the community area and has done so, with the exception of his eight year incarceration, since 1999.
- Patti Blagojevich (born 1965), First Lady of Illinois (2003–2009). She resides on West Sunnyside Avenue in the community area and has done so since 1999.
- Neil Bluhm (born 1938), billionaire real estate and casino magnate. He was a childhood resident of Albany Park.
- Nancy Faust (born 1947), organist for the Chicago White Sox from 1970–2010. Graduated from Theodore Roosevelt High School and North Park University.
- Neal Gabler (born 1950), journalist, writer, and film critic. He was a childhood resident of 5133 North Kilbourn Avenue.
- Carl Giammares, singer and member of The Buckinghams resided at 4727 North Sacramento Avenue.
- Cecil Heftel (1924–2010), member of the United States House of Representatives from Hawaii's 1st congressional district (1977-1986). He was raised in Albany Park and attended Roosevelt High School.
- Randy Jackson (1926–2019), professional baseball player. He lived in Ravenswood Manor when playing for the Chicago Cubs.
- Alaric Jans (born 1949), film and theater composer. He is a past president of the Ravenswood Manor Improvement Association.
- Jerry Krause (1939–2017), general manager of the Chicago Bulls from 1985 until his retirement in 2003. He was raised in Albany Park.
- Sid Luckman (1916–1998), American football quarterback for the Chicago Bears. He was a resident of Ranvenswood Manor.
- Fred Pfeffer (1860–1932), professional baseball player. He was a resident of Ravenswood Manor at the time of his death.
- Elias Rodriguez (born 1994), perpetrator in the 2025 Capital Jewish Museum shooting. He lived in Albany Park throughout his life, and resided in an apartment complex on 4700 North Troy Street before flying to Washington, D.C. prior to the shooting.
- Elroy Sandquist Sr. (1899–1970), member of the Illinois House of Representatives from 1966 until his death in 1970. He resided at 2762 West Wilson Avenue during his legislative career.
- Elroy Sandquist Jr. (1922–1996), member of the Illinois House of Representatives from 1977 to 1983.
- Abe Saperstein (1902–1966), founder, coach and owner of the Harlem Globetrotters. He resided at 2948 West Eastwood Avenue.
- Bob Sirott (born 1949), broadcaster. As of September 2017, he is a midday radio host at WLS-AM.
- Ruth Ann Steinhagen (1929–2012), secretary who attempted to murder Eddie Waitkus in 1949. She resided at 5031 N. Sawyer Avenue from 1970 until her death.
- Sam Zell (1941–2023), billionaire and founder and chairman of Equity International. He lived in Albany Park until his family moved to suburban Highland Park, Illinois when he was twelve.
