= Oak Park Festival Theatre =

Theatre company in Oak Park, Illinois

Oak Park Festival Theatre (OPFT) is a professional theatre company in Oak Park, Illinois, under contract with Actors' Equity Association. The company was founded in 1975 by Marion Kaczmar, an Oak Park resident and arts patron, and performed Renaissance works, almost exclusively by William Shakespeare, until 2004, when it broadened its scope to classics of other eras. Its outdoor venue has been Austin Gardens, a wooded park near downtown Oak Park within walking distance from restaurants, Frank Lloyd Wright landmarks, and Metra and CTA trains. To attract a greater following, Renaissance, classical, and modern American works were added to the offerings, some being produced indoors in historic Farson-Mills Home and, in the 2010-11 season, in the studio space in the Madison Street Theatre.

Audience members in Austin Gardens often picnic before performances. Occasionally, special performances by the Oak Park Recorder Society or other pre-show events are presented. Special Family Day performances and child-centered special crafts, games, and activities are held at least twice a summer to encourage families to introduce their children to Shakespeare.

== History ==
=== Predecessor ===
Oak Park had a Shakespeare theatre previous to OPFT. In the 1950s and 1960s, producers Josephine Forsberg, Ed Udovic, and actor-director Lee Henry created Village Classics Theatre and produced The Taming of the Shrew, A Midsummer Night's Dream, Richard III, and other productions outdoors on the hill of Field Playground under the auspices of the Recreation Department of the Village of Oak Park. Actors who performed included Equity performers Val Bettin, Robert Kidd, Tom Elrod, and Angel Casey, as well as many Oak Park residents such as Clifford Osborne and Nick Cotsonas. The hill was, at that time, crowned on all sides with numerous large bushes and small trees, providing a natural set for battle scenes and forest liaisons. The professionalism of the productions brought, among others, esteemed Chicago Tribune drama critic Richard Christiansen, a native Oak Parker, to the theater.

=== Early decades ===
Oak Park Festival Theatre was begun in 1975 by Marion Kaczmar, an Oak Park resident. Its first production was A Midsummer Night's Dream with a cast that included David Mamet and William H. Macy. Its artistic directors since then have included Patrick O'Gara, Tom Mula, David Darlow, Dale Calandra, and Jack Hickey.

The 1980s were heady years for the theater. With numerous Actors' Equity contracts attracting Chicago professional actors and the presence of talented non-Equity actors, audiences numbering in the 300s and 400s came to see Shakespeare under the stars.

=== Later decades ===
The 1990s began some difficult years for OPFT. During this time the number of Chicago area theaters quadrupled and other theaters, inspired by Festival Theatre's success, began to produce Shakespeare on a regular basis. The resulting decrease in attendance compounded by some questionable management decisions and the elimination of arts funding from the Village of Oak Park necessitated a decrease in the number of Actors' Equity contracts that could be offered.

In 2002 Joyce Porter, an actress, director, Professor of Theatre at Moraine Valley Community College, and member of the Board of Directors since 1989, averted a vote by the board to cease production and was, shortly after, elected President of the Board.

Porter envisioned broadening the focus of the theater to performing classics of all eras year-round indoors as well as outdoors. The new artistic director, Jack Hickey, who had been appointed by the previous board president, worked with Porter to effect this expansion in phases. They attracted new board members and began financial reforms that led to solvency within a few years. Additional innovations under Porter's leadership included educational programs, including a college intern program, the creation of a touring show, later revised and directed by Kevin Theis, and a summer workshop for teens. The theater, in a very real sense, owes its continued existence to the dedication of Porter and Hickey.

In 2010, Kevin Theis and Belinda Bremner were elected co-presidents of the board and began the expanded four-production season with stable theatre finances.

=== Productions/actors ===
For most of its history, OPFT produced almost exclusively works by William Shakespeare. These included multiple productions of The Taming of the Shrew, A Midsummer Night's Dream, The Tempest, The Merchant of Venice, As You Like It, and Romeo and Juliet, as well as Julius Caesar, The Comedy of Errors, Hamlet, Macbeth, Love's Labour's Lost, and others. It also presented notable original adaptations of classics, including Falstaff by Tom Mula and Don Quixote by Dale Calandra. In 2011 it presented the History of King Henry IV, an adaptation by Stanton Davis of Shakespeare's Henry IV parts 1 and 2. Featured Actors' Equity members have included Chicago actors David Mamet, David Darlow, Kristine Thatcher, Kevin Theis, Don Brearley, William J. Norris, Greg Vinkler, Aaron Christiansen, Ned Mochel, Susan Hart, Ray Andrecheck, Lanny Lutz, George Wilson, Kevin Gudahl, Mary Michell, Barbara Zahora, Henry Godinez, Steve Pickering, Kathey Logelin, Linda Kimborough, and others, as well as professional non-Equity actors such as Dennis Grimes, David Skvarla, Mark Richard, Michael W. Halberstam, Robert Petkoff, Toni Graves, Krista Lally, Maggie Kettering, Anne Gottlieb, Peter Ash, Meredith Siemsen, and Christopher Prentice.

Its expanded production schedule has included Faith Healer, Picnic, Tartuffe, All My Sons, Cyrano de Bergerac, and other plays considered to be classics of many eras.

== Recent productions ==
| Year | Play | Author | Director |
|---|---|---|---|
| 1998 | The Adventures of Don Quixote | Miguel de Cervantes; Adapted by Dale Calandra | Dale Calandra |
| 1999 | Macbeth | Wm. Shakespeare | Henry Godinez |
| 2000 | Twelfth Night | Wm. Shakespeare | Dale Calandra |
| 2001 | The Taming of the Shrew | Wm. Shakespeare | Dale Calandra |
| 2002 | A Midsummer Night's Dream | Wm. Shakespeare | Dale Calandra |
| 2003 | As You Like It | Wm. Shakespeare | Jack Hickey |
| 2004 | Romeo and Juliet | Wm. Shakespeare | Virginia Smith |
| 2005 | The Comedy of Errors | Wm. Shakespeare | Jack Hickey |
| 2005 | All My Sons | Arthur Miller | David Mink |
| 2006 | Tartuffe | Molière | David Mink |
| 2006 | Julius Caesar | Wm. Shakespeare | David Mink |
| 2006 | Picnic | William Inge | Kevin Theis |
| 2007 | Murder by the Book | Duncan Greenwood and Robert King | David Mink |
| 2007 | Talley's Folly | Lanford Wilson | Michael Weber |
| 2007 | Robin Hood | Scott Lynch-Giddings | Kevin Theis |
| 2008 | Blithe Spirit | Noël Coward | David Mink |
| 2008 | Much Ado About Nothing | Wm. Shakespeare | Jack Hickey |
| 2008 | Dancing at Lughnasa | Brian Friel | Belinda Bremner |
| 2009 | Arms and the Man | George Bernard Shaw | Kevin Christopher Fox |
| 2009 | Fifth of July | Lanford Wilson | Michael Weber |
| 2009 | Cyrano de Bergerac | Edmond Rostand | Kevin Theis |
| 2010 | Of Mice and Men | John Steinbeck | Belinda Bremner |
| 2010 | Love's Labour's Lost | Wm. Shakespeare | Jack Hickey |
| 2010 | Betrayal | Harold Pinter | Kevin Christopher Fox |
| 2011 | Faith Healer | Brian Friel | Belinda Bremner |
| 2011 | The History of King Henry the Fourth | Wm. Shakespeare; Adapted by Stanton Davis | Stanton Davis |
| 2011 | Henry V | Wm. Shakespeare | Kevin Theis |
| 2012 | Glass Menagerie | Tennessee Williams | Kevin Theis |
| 2012 | Beyond the Fringe | Alan Bennett, Peter Cook, Jonathan Miller, Dudley Moore | David Mink |
| 2012 | Inherit the Wind | Jerome Lawrence and Robert E. Lee | Steve Pickering |
| 2012 | Richard III | Wm. Shakespeare | Belinda Bremner |
| 2012 | Someone Who'll Watch Over Me | Frank McGuinness | Belinda Bremner |
| 2013 | Seascape | Edward Albee | Stephanie Shaw |
| 2013 | Amadeus | Peter Shaffer | Mark Richard |
| 2013 | Twelfth Night | Wm. Shakespeare | Lavina Jadhwani |
| 2014 | Hamlet | Wm. Shakespeare | Lavina Jadhwani |
| 2014 | The Importance of Being Earnest | Oscar Wilde | Kevin Theis |
| 2015 | To Kill a Mockingbird | Harper Lee (adapted by Christopher Sergel) | Vaun Monroe |
| 2015 | Two Gentlemen of Verona | Wm. Shakespeare | Lavina Jadhwani |
| 2016 | Pygmalion | G.B. Shaw | Jason Gerace |
| 2016 | The Taming of the Shrew | Wm. Shakespeare | Adrianne Cury |
| 2017 | Macbeth | Wm. Shakespeare | Barbara Zahora |
| 2017 | The Amish Project | Jessica Dickey | Melanie Keller |
| 2017 | The Fair Maid of the West | Thomas Heywood | Kevin Theis |
| 2017 | A Dickens Carol | Nancy Crowley | Kevin Theis |
| 2018 | You Can't Take It with You | George S. Kaufman & Moss Hart | Jason Gerace |
| 2018 | Daughters of Ire | Savanna Rae | Carin Silkaitis |
| 2018 | The African Company Presents Richard III | Carlyle Brown | Ron OJ Parson |
| 2018 | A Dickens Carol | Nancy Crowley | Matt Gall and Kevin Theis |
| 2019 | I & You | Lauren Gunderson | Bryan Wakefield |
| 2019 | Elizabeth Rex | Timothy Findley | Barbara Zahora |
| 2019 | Much Ado About Nothing | Wm. Shakespeare | Melanie Keller |
| 2019 | The Madness of Edgar Allan Poe: A Love Story | David Rice | Skyler Schrempp |
| 2022 | The Winter's Tale | Wm. Shakespeare | Kevin Theis |
| 2023 | A Midsummer Night's Dream | Wm. Shakespeare | Peter G. Andersen |
| 2024 | Romeo and Juliet | Wm. Shakespeare | Peter G. Andersen |
