= Last Comiskey =

2023 baseball documentary film

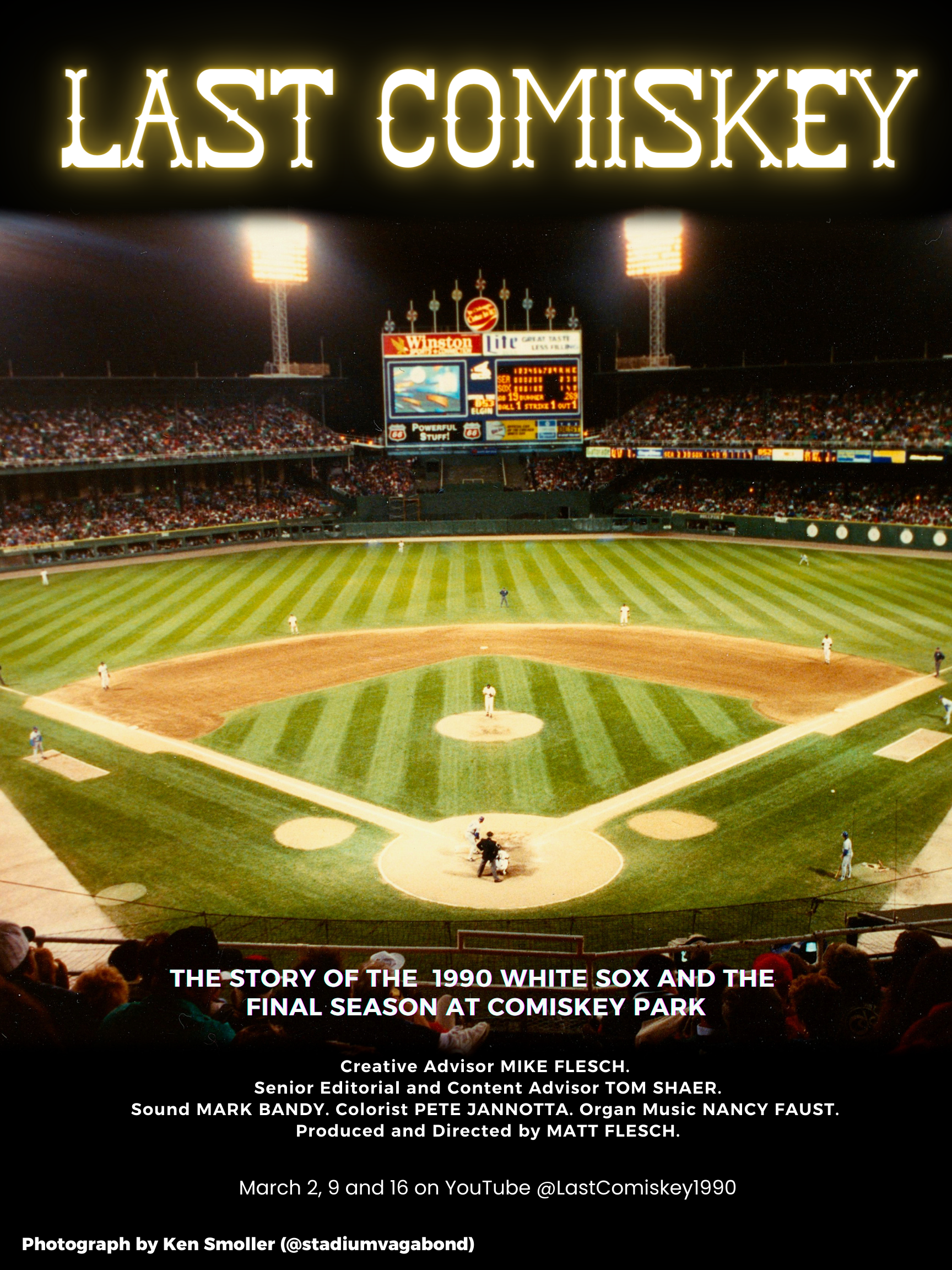
- Official theatrical poster
- Directed by: Matt Flesch
- Produced by: Matt Flesch; Mike Flesch (Creative Advisor); Tom Shaer (Senior Editorial and Content Advisor); Pete Jannotta (Color); Mark Bandy (Sound)
- Music by: Nancy Faust
- Release date: March 2, 2023
- Running time: 118 minutes (total); Part I: 36 minutes Part II: 42 minutes Part III: 40 minutes
- Country: United States
- Language: English

Last Comiskey is a 2023 American documentary film directed by Matt Flesch, an American independent filmmaker. Flesch's film chronicles the 1990 Chicago White Sox season. 1990 was the last year the White Sox played at Comiskey Park, their home stadium since 1910. Inspired by the ESPN basketball documentary The Last Dance, and created as a hobby during the COVID-19 pandemic, Flesch's film includes archival footage, interviews with players, coaches, media personalities, stadium employees, and longtime fans.

== Synopsis ==
In 1990, as their last season in their 80-year-old ballpark dawns, the Chicago White Sox suffered through four consecutive losing seasons. They are predicted to finish in last place. Surprising many, under the leadership of manager Jeff Torborg, the team gets off to a fast start, close on the heels of the preseason favorites and defending World Series champions, the Oakland Athletics. Assistant General Manager Dan Evans, pitcher Wayne Edwards, and shortstop Ozzie Guillen give credit to Torborg, who motivated his players and instilled enthusiasm within them. Much credit is also given to Guillen, a loquacious team leader who passionately played shortstop. Years later, Guillen would manage the team in the 2005 World Series, their first World Series victory in 88 years.

A season initially expected to be unsuccessful ultimately turns out to be a retrospective commemoration of Comiskey Park and White Sox baseball. Key players from that season, including starting pitcher Jack McDowell, relief pitcher Bobby Thigpen, and other players, share their reminiscences of the season. One such player, pitcher Donn Pall, grew up a White Sox fan and commuted from his childhood home during the 1990 season.

Longtime ballpark fixtures such as Nancy Faust, White Sox organist for 41 years, shared her favorite moments from the ballpark's history. Faust, who received an RIAA Gold Record for her popularization of Steam's "Na Na Hey Hey Kiss Him Goodbye", which she turned into a stadium taunt that would become popular worldwide, is seen interacting with admiring fans, and developing musical accompaniments tailored to individual players and game situations. The players shared reminiscences of the old stadium's home clubhouse, from its low ceilings, tight quarters, and other peculiarities to its much loved clubhouse manager, Willie "Chicken Willie" Thompson. Thompson wore many hats, including serving as the clubhouse chef.

As the team gave chase to the vaunted Oakland A's, the atmosphere in the old stadium became electric. The intensity in the ballpark was heightened even more through Faust's leading the excited fans in attendance with her organ playing, particularly with her "Na Na Hey Hey Goodbye" chant.

Longtime vendor Mark Reiner offered a humorous anecdote about selling beer on the field during Comiskey's infamous 1979 Disco Demolition Night riot. As a young fan, pitcher Donn Pall remembered attending Disco Demolition Night. Vendor and stadium archivist Lloyd Rutzky provided insights into Comiskey Park's unique stadium culture.

The film discusses the impact of Baseball Hall of Fame catcher Carlton Fisk. Fisk, a veteran leader on the team, was an imposing presence who often intimidated the young members of the pitching staff. A rookie in 1990, pitcher Scott Radinsky related his trepidation when he discovered he was assigned to a clubhouse locker next to the veteran catcher and future Hall of Famer.

The 1990 team included several rising stars, starting pitcher Jack McDowell, third baseman Robin Ventura, who initially struggled in the big leagues before he became a star, aggressive starting pitcher Alex Fernandez, and future Hall of Famer first baseman/designated hitter Frank Thomas. Thomas, a rookie, was a mid-season call-up from the minor leagues who made an instant impact on the team with his powerful hitting.

The film contains a discussion of the distinctive architecture of the park, designed by noted architect Zachary Taylor Davis, including the close-in upper deck, which provided an intimate experience, unlike most upper seating areas in modern stadiums. Also mentioned were the stadium's trademark Prairie School archways, the immaculately cared-for grounds, and Bard's Room, where former owner Bill Veeck would entertain friends and reporters until the wee hours of the morning.

The 1990 season ended with the Chicago White Sox finishing behind the Oakland Athletics in the standings. On September 30, 1990, Comiskey Park closed, marking the end of a long period in the club's history.

== Interviews ==
This is the list of the 36 persons interviewed for the documentary, in order as listed in the film's credits:

- Nancy Faust
- Ozzie Guillen
- Jack McDowell
- Bobby Thigpen
- Ron Kittle
- Lance Johnson
- Scott Fletcher
- Scott Radinsky
- Greg Hibbard
- Donn Pall
- Wayne Edwards
- Dave Gallagher
- Vance Law
- Phil Bradley
- Dan Evans
- David Marran
- Tom Shaer
- Kenny McReynolds
- Chuck Garfien
- Rich King
- Cheryl Raye Stout
- Mark Curnutte
- Nick Murkawski
- Lloyd Rutzky
- Mark Reiner
- David Rugendorf
- John Brudnak
- Matt Biscan
- Mark Liptak
- Frank Budreck
- Brian Powers (Bandbox Ballparks)
- Robert Gordon
- Stephanie Walters
- Peter Wilt
- Greg Novak
- Doug Peterson

== Critical reception ==
Last Comiskey premiered on YouTube on March 2, 2023. (total) It consists of three episodes. The second and third episodes were released on March 9 and 16, 2023, respectively.

The film was selected to screen at "SABR 51," an annual convention of the Society for American Baseball Research, which took place July 5–9, 2023, in Chicago.

The initial reception was positive. Writing in the Chicago Tribune, columnist Paul Sullivan said, "It's a must see for any [White] Sox fan, from baby boomers who remember what it was like to millennials who never got to experience the old park."

Tyler Kepner, a senior writer for The Athletic, and former baseball writer for The New York Times, had this to say about the documentary: "The film is so intoxicating, you can practically taste the Schlitz. With vintage fan footage supplementing the many voices, Flesch brings to life a ballpark and a season when the White Sox were basking in nostalgia and brimming with hope."

Writing in Axios Chicago, reviewer Justin Kaufmann called the film "outstanding," "It makes you feel Comiskey Park," and "[a] must watch for fans. It's incredible to see an old Carlton Fisk and a young Sammy Sosa playing together."

Reviewer Dan Day, Jr. writes that "Last Comiskey" covers its subject "in spectacular and entertaining fashion, by featuring talks with Sox player, team & stadium employees, fans, and local journalists who covered what went on in the 1990 season. The series gives a 'regular guy' view of what happened with the White Sox in 1990, along with recreating the sights, sounds, and ambiance of Old Comiskey Park." He continues to say: "'Last Comiskey' was made by White Sox fans, for White Sox fans, but I'm sure anyone interested in baseball will enjoy it. The rare footage alone makes it worthy for baseball buffs, and those who were around following MLB in 1990 will certainly have reason to watch it."

Writing in the Daily Herald, Jim O'Donnell says, "determined basement documentarian Matt Flesch of Arlington Heights captures so much of the attitude and energy of the old Sox ballgames in 'Last Comiskey,' a marvelous three part series on YouTube." He says, "'Last Comiskey' underscores that vibrant, engaging content is now being produced off the Main Drag of big-ticket sports media."

== Book adaptation ==
In 2024, stadium photographer and sports travel blogger Ken Smoller (https://www.stadiumvagabond.com) released a book version of the documentary film on Eckhartz Press. The book, created with Flesch's cooperation, is 186 pages in length, and contains hundreds of photographs, including many that appeared in the 2023 Flesch documentary. The book also includes numerous quotes from the film, as well as additional textual comments and a foreword from former White Sox shortstop and manager Ozzie Guillen.

== See also ==
- List of baseball films
- 1990 Chicago White Sox
- Comiskey Park
