= Russell A. Berg =

United States Air Force general

Russell Allen Berg
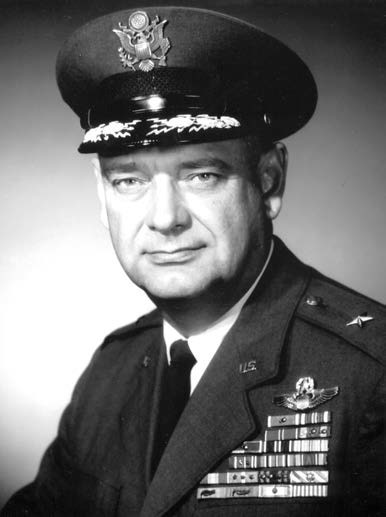
- Born: 6 January 1917; Chicago, Illinois
- Died: 24 January 2002 (aged 85); San Antonio, Texas
- Burial place: Fort Sam Houston National Cemetery, San Antonio, Texas
- Military career
- Allegiance: United States
- Branch: United States Army (1941–1947); United States Air Force (1947–1970)
- Service years: 1940–1970
- Rank: Brigadier general
- Commands: 67th Tactical Reconnaissance Wing
- Conflicts: World War II; Korean War
- Awards: Legion of Merit (2); Distinguished Flying Cross; Air Medal (9); Bronze Star Medal; Army Commendation Medal; Distinguished Flying Cross (2) (UK); Croix de Guerre (France); Croix de guerre (Belgium)

Russell Allen Berg (6 January 1917 – 24 January 2002) was a brigadier general in the United States Air Force. During World War II he flew Supermarine Spitfires with the British Royal Air Force, earning the British Distinguished Flying Cross and bar. He also flew reconnaissance missions during the Korean War.

== Biography ==
Russell Allen Berg was born on 6 January 1917 in Chicago, Illinois, the son of Werner and Blenda Berg. He graduated from Roosevelt High School in 1935 and from Grinnell College, from which he received his Bachelor of Science degree in 1940.

Berg began training with the United States Army Air Corps in 1940 and was commissioned as a second lieutenant on completion of his pilot training at Maxwell Field in Alabama in April 1941. During World War II, he was assigned to the Royal Air Force, and flew 35 combat missions with No. 610 Squadron RAF in Supermarine Spitfires. He later flew missions in P-51 Mustangs, P-38 Lightnings and A-20 Havocs with the 12th Tactical Reconnaissance Squadron and the 10th Photographic Group. After the war, Berg became an instructor with the Wisconsin Air National Guard, and then was assigned to the Headquarters of the Tactical Air Command at Langley Air Force Base in Virginia. In 1946, he married Joan Mortrude. They had two children: a daughter, Marilee, and a son, Thomas.

During the Korean War, Berg commanded the 67th Tactical Reconnaissance Wing, flying reconnaissance missions over North Korea. He returned to the United States in August 1953, and became chief of the Reconnaissance Division in the Directorate of Operations at United States Air Force (USAF) headquarters in Washington, DC. He was the Air Force project officer for Project Aquatone, the joint USAF-CIA program that developed the Lockheed U-2 high-altitude reconnaissance aircraft. He attended the National War College in 1956 and 1957, and then was assigned to Allied Air Force Central Europe of NATO as chief of the Reconnaissance Division.

Berg returned to the United States in August 1960, and became chief of staff of the Ballistic Missile Division located at Los Angeles Air Force Station in El Segundo, California. He then became vice commander of the Satellite System Division, and deputy director of the Air Force Special Projects Office. Other positions he held include deputy director of the Manned Orbiting Laboratory and assignments with the United States Secretary of the Air Force and the Joint Chiefs of Staff. On 1 February 1967, he became director of the Office of Space Systems. He retired on 1 August 1970.

Awards Berg received include the Legion of Merit with oak leaf cluster, the Distinguished Flying Cross, the Air Medal with eight oak leaf clusters, the Bronze Star Medal, the Army Commendation Medal, the Air Force Outstanding Unit Award, the British Distinguished Flying Cross and bar, the French Croix de Guerre with palm device, the Belgian Croix de guerre with palm device and the Republic of Korea Presidential Unit Citation.

Berg died on 24 January 2002 in San Antonio, Texas, and was buried in Fort Sam Houston National Cemetery.
