= George Schmidt =

American football player (1927–1995)

No. 54, 81
- Position: Defensive end

Personal information
- Born: October 28, 1927; Chicago, Illinois, U.S.
- Died: August 29, 1995 (aged 67); Schaumburg, Illinois, U.S.
- Listed height: 6 ft 2 in (1.88 m)
- Listed weight: 230 lb (104 kg)

Career information
- College: Lewis

Career history
- Green Bay Packers (1952); Chicago Cardinals (1953)

Career statistics
- Safeties: 1
- Kick returns: 1
- Return yards: 14
- Stats at Pro Football Reference

George Schmidt (October 28, 1927 – August 29, 1995) was an American football defensive end in the National Football League. He played professionally for the Green Bay Packers and the Chicago Cardinals.

== Early life and career ==
Schmidt was born in Chicago and attended Theodore Roosevelt High School. He played college football at Lewis University and Illinois Tech.

He first played in the NFL with the Green Bay Packers during the 1952 NFL season, joining the Packers as a free agent. The following season, he played with the Chicago Cardinals.
