= Albany Park Library =

Public library in Chicago

Coordinates: 41.975117°N 87.713685°W

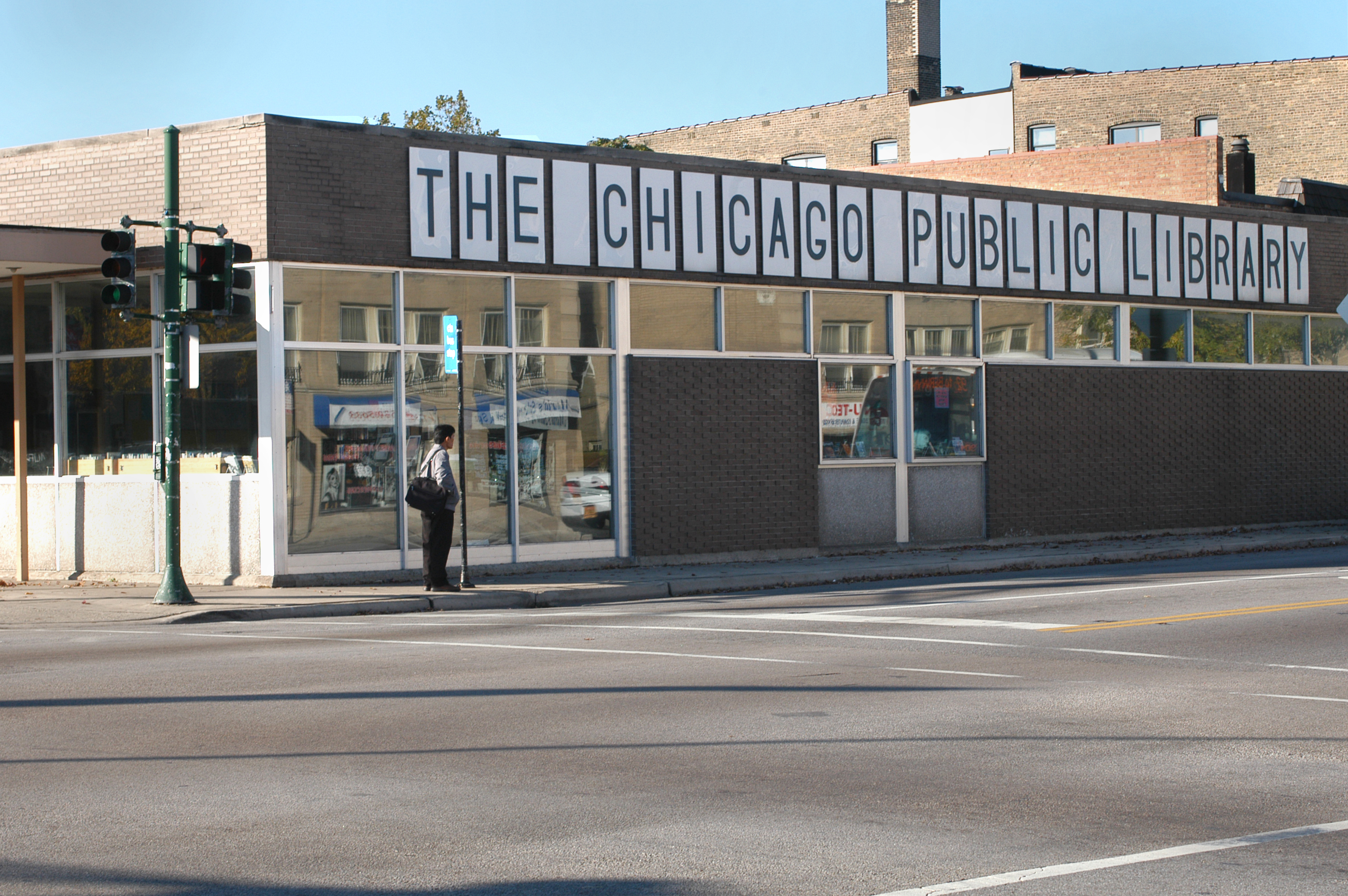
- The library in 2004, which has since undergone renovation.
- Location: Chicago, Illinois, United States
- Established: 1963

Other information
- Website: www.chipublib.org/locations/3/

Albany Park Library is a branch of the Chicago Public Library located at 3401 W. Foster Ave. in the North Park neighborhood of Chicago, in the U.S. state of Illinois. It was opened in 1963 to serve both the Albany Park and North Park areas of Chicago, and is ADA compliant. It currently holds large collections of Korean and Spanish language materials.

== Renovation ==
In 2012 the Albany Park Library received funding to begin a $15 million renovation of their 50-year-old building. Notices were put up in June for residents of the area to use the nearby library at Northeastern Illinois University, and a bookmobile route of the city made sure to include the North Park section of Chicago on its route.

Construction of the new facility took just under two years, opening on September 13, 2014. With an increase of 6,000 feet, additional space for a computer room, and expanded stacks for book storage, the mayor of Chicago, Rahm Emanuel declared the branch "the new gold standard" for libraries in the city. One of the key features to the new library was a learning space built for toddlers, and since its creation picture book collection of the branch has grown by 30%.

== See also ==
- Chicago Public Library
