= Eugene Field Park =

- U.S. National Register of Historic Places
- U.S. Historic district
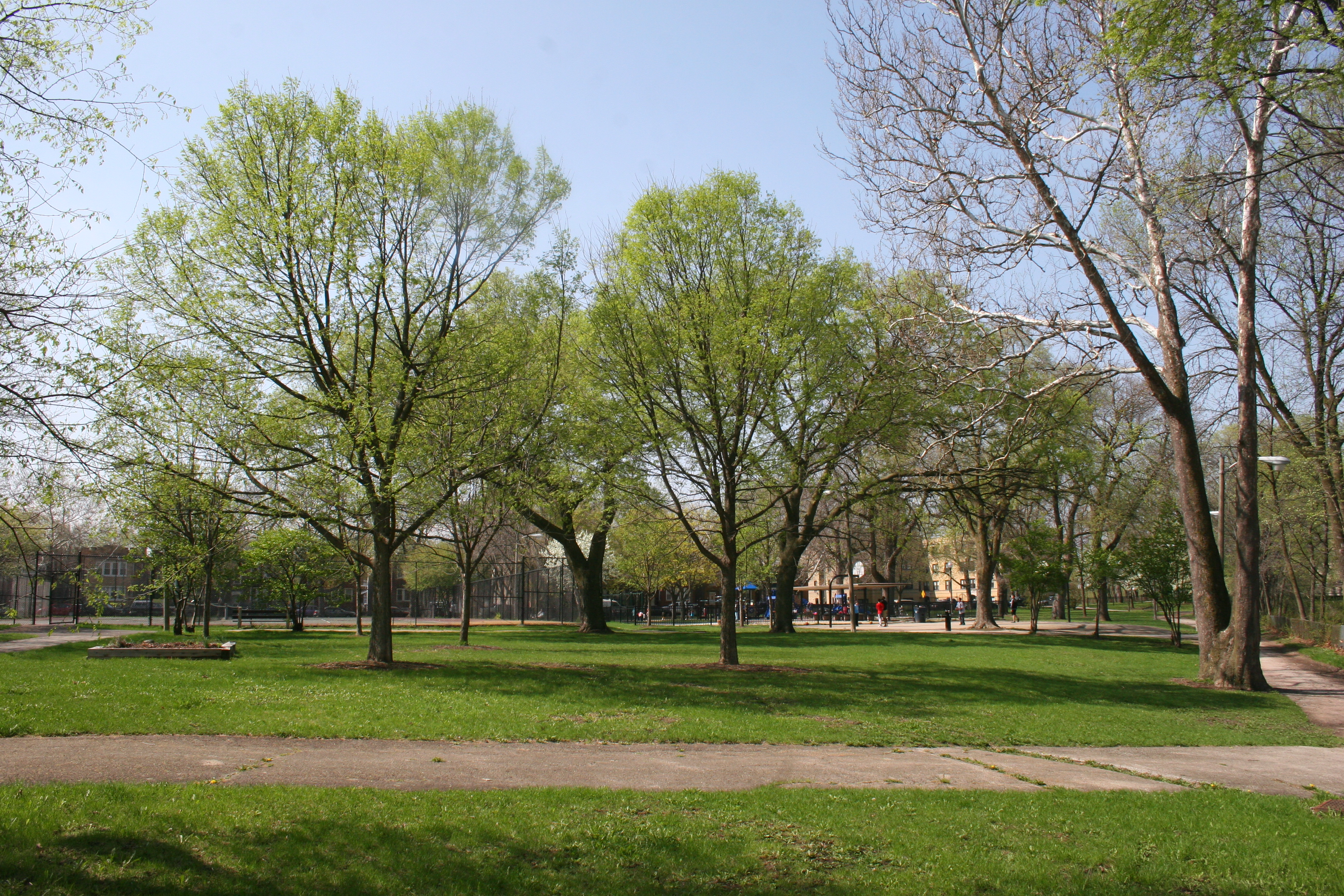
- Eugene Field Park

- Location within Chicago metropolitan area Location within Illinois Location within the United States
- Location: Chicago, Cook County, Illinois, United States
- Coordinates: 41°58′36″N 87°43′25″W
- Built: 1925
- Architect: Henry J. Stockmans, Clarence Hatzfeld
- Architectural style: Tudor Revival
- MPS: Historic Resources of the Chicago Park District Multiple Property Submission
- NRHP reference No.: 06000677
- Added to NRHP: August 8, 2006

Eugene Field Park is a public park located along the North Branch of the Chicago River in the Albany Park neighborhood of Chicago. The park is named for author Eugene Field. The park was platted, designed and constructed between 1923 and 1930, with the Clarence Hatzfeld-designed field house completed in 1930 under the auspices of the Albany Park District. The Chicago Park District was consolidated in 1934 and took over Eugene Field Park. The park has seen numerous changes and improvements over the years. Eugene Field park has tennis courts, athletic fields, a playground, two bridges, and a 60-foot-tall light tower. The park and its historic features were listed on the National Register of Historic Places in 2006.

== History ==
=== 1920s ===
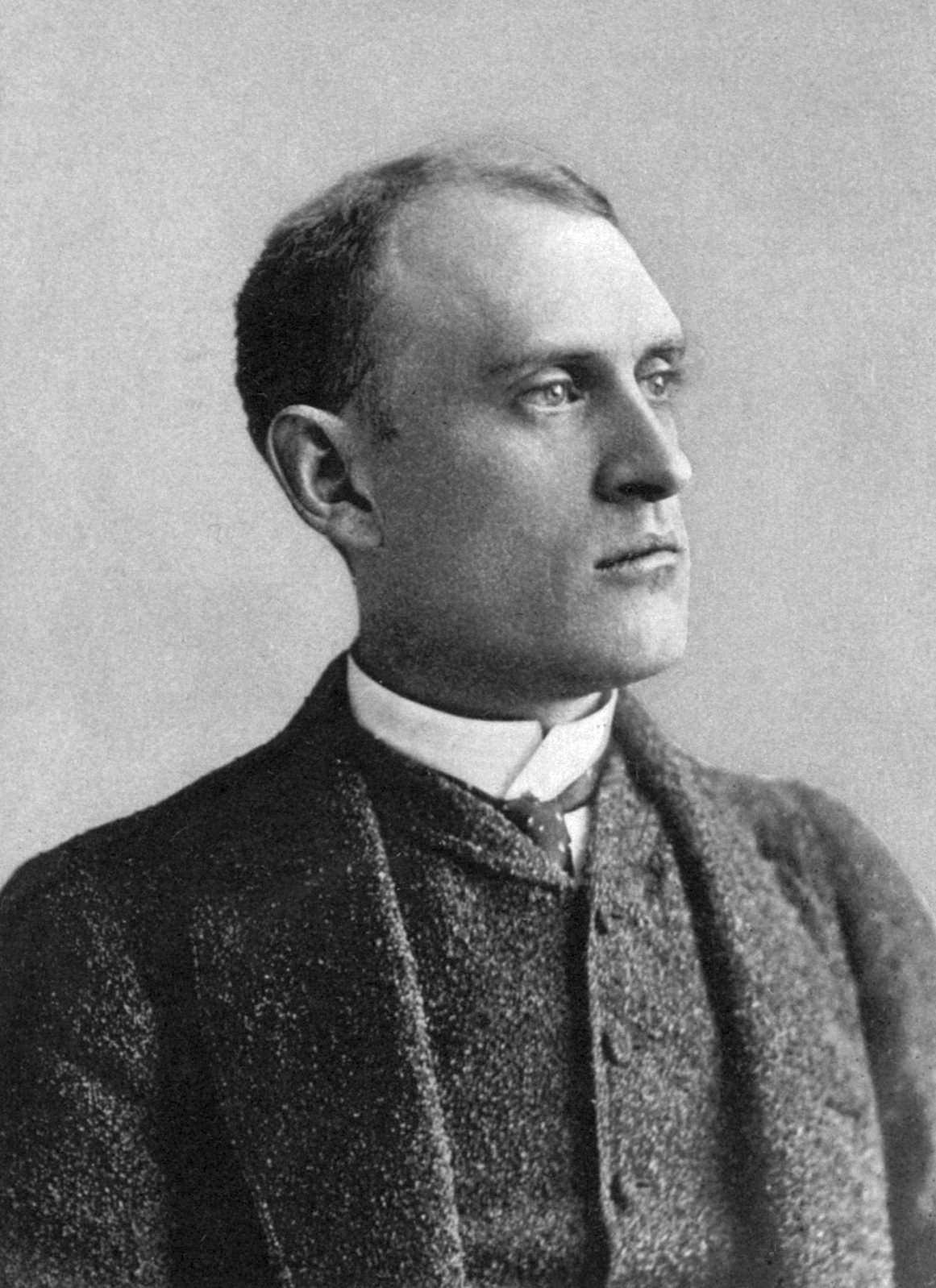
Author of Wynken, Blynken, and Nod, and park namesake Eugene Field.

Eugene Field Park is located on 16 acres of land along the North Branch of the Chicago River in the Northwest Side neighborhood of Albany Park. The river cuts a diagonal path across the park site. Originally, the park was one of 2 parks commissioned by the now defunct Albany Park District. The Albany Park District made the first land purchases for what was then known as Central Park in 1923, but park improvements were not undertaken until 1925. The Albany Park District officially changed the park's name from Central Park to Eugene Field Park in November 1926. The park is named for Eugene Field, an important American writer; Field's name may have been selected through a contest held by the park district. He was born in St. Louis but lived in Chicago after 1883 where he worked as a journalist. Field is best known for his work as a children's poet (Wynken, Blynken, and Nod, Little Boy Blue).

=== 1930s and 1940s ===
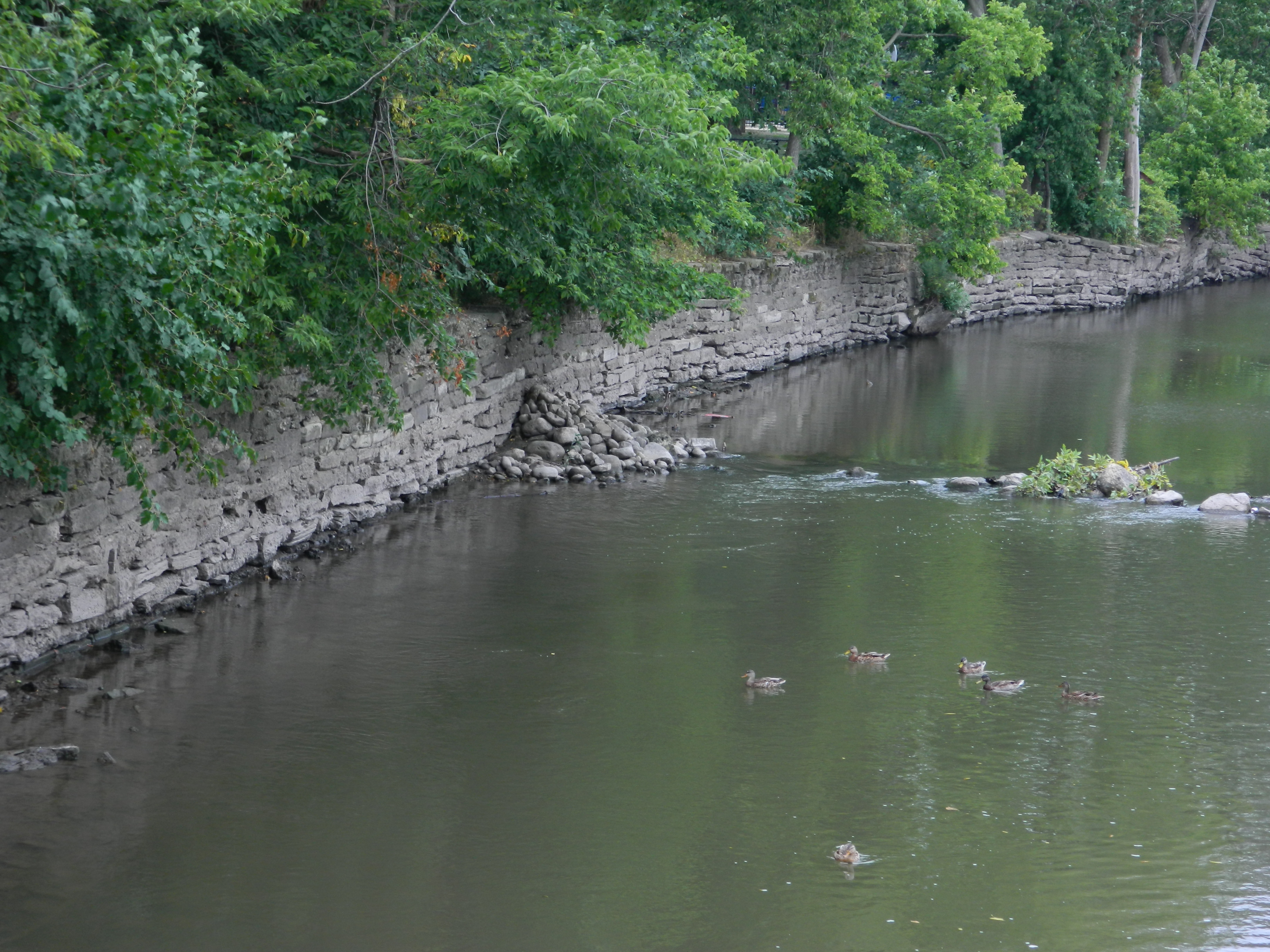
Part of a 1940s WPA project included the construction of a retaining wall along the Chicago River.

By 1930 nearly half of Albany Park's population was Jewish, about 23,000 people. Much of Albany Park's Jewish population was concentrated in a small area bounded by the Chicago River (east), Pulaski Road (west), Foster Avenue (north) and Montrose Avenue (south). Eugene Field Park, along with Bohemian National Cemetery, was one of the several open tracts of land in that area. As such, Jewish residents of Albany Park would often use Eugene Field Park as a gathering point. The elderly would congregate at the park to play pinochle. For the younger generation, dances at Eugene Field Park's field house were a common event. Many Jewish organizations utilized Eugene Field Park's field house during the Depression years. Some of those groups include: Congregation B'nai Sholom, the Albany Park Hadassah, the Kimball Bryn Mawr Hebrew School, and the National Home for Jewish Children of Denver. Additionally, Christian groups used the facilities at the field house as well. Groups such as Ainsile Baptist Church, the Albany Park Presbyterian Church, and others used the field house throughout the 1930s. Other, non-religious, groups used the park's field house during this time too. For example, the 39th Ward Civic Club and Chicago Public Library; and the building was sometimes used by needy families trying to raise funds or by groups holding a benefit such as the Albany Park Employees Association.

The Albany Park District fell behind on its bills by 1932 and it became clear that the district, as an independent entity, was not going to survive the lean years of the Great Depression. In 1934 there were 22 separate park districts operating in the city of Chicago. That year, motivated by the fiscal disaster the Depression had brought to many small independent agencies, voters approved the Park Consolidation Act of 1934 and unified all 22 disparate park districts, including the Albany Park District, into the Chicago Park District. The newly formed conglomerate qualified for $82 million in federal funding through the Works Progress Administration (WPA) and the Public Works Administration (PWA) between 1935 and 1941. These funds allowed extensive improvements throughout the Chicago park system and Eugene Field Park saw many changes in the 1930s and early 1940s. The athletic fields were improved, paths and sidewalks laid, and through a 1941-42 WPA project the river banks were graded, and retaining wall, rip rap, and chain link fence were installed along the river bank. It was during this time that the 60 foot tall light tower was erected near the tennis courts.

=== 2000s ===
In 2001, Albany Park Theater Project, a youth theater ensemble that makes theater based on the stories of people from the Albany Park neighborhood, took residence at the park through the Chicago Park District's Arts Partners in Residence program. In 2008 the Illinois Environmental Protection Agency undertook a two-week project that removed 1400 cubic feet of illegally dumped concrete, asphalt and shingles in a half-acre section of the park.

=== 2010s ===
Beginning in April 2011 the U.S. Army Corps of Engineers undertook a project intended to restore the degraded river habitats. The project aimed to restore wetland and oak savanna habitats around the river, including the removal of invasive species such as cottonwood trees. The $1.5 million project is slated for completion in September 2015.Eastern cottonwood (Populus deltoides) is one of the largest North American hardwood trees, a native Chicago species classified under Elm-Ash-Cottonwood ecosystem riparian zones.

=== Flooding ===
The area around Eugene Field Park has been subject to flooding over the years; floods struck the area in 2008 and 2013. As early as the 1930s, residents in Albany Park and nearby North Park requested help due to flooding. In 1940-41 a WPA project undertaken by the city attempted to alleviate flooding by dredging the riverbed, regrading the river banks and laying a V-shaped concrete channel in the river bed. The work extended from the North Shore Channel to the pedestrian bridge in Eugene Field Park.

The National Weather Service (NWS) maintains a river gauge east of the park along Albany Avenue, close to River Park. Of the top ten historical crests for the North Branch Chicago River at the NWS monitoring gauge, seven of them have occurred since 2001. The April 2013 floods, which cancelled 630 flights at O'Hare International Airport and flooded over 1,200 Chicago and suburban basements, set a record for high water at the NWS river gauge near Eugene Field Park. The river reached 8.85 feet on April 18, 2013; Eugene Field Park typically begins to flood when water levels reach 6.0 feet.

The 2013 floods led Chicago Mayor Rahm Emanuel to criticize a previous city plan to alleviate flooding by installing more marshland along the river. Several days after the high water record was set at the Albany Avenue river gauge, Emanuel, Congressman Mike Quigley, Illinois State Senator Ira Silverstein, and other officials gathered at Eugene Field Park to announce a new plan to address flooding in Albany Park. The plan involves sinking a one-mile tunnel beneath Foster Avenue from Eugene Field Park, east, to the North Shore Channel. A pipeline within the tunnel would carry excess water to the channel.

== Facilities ==
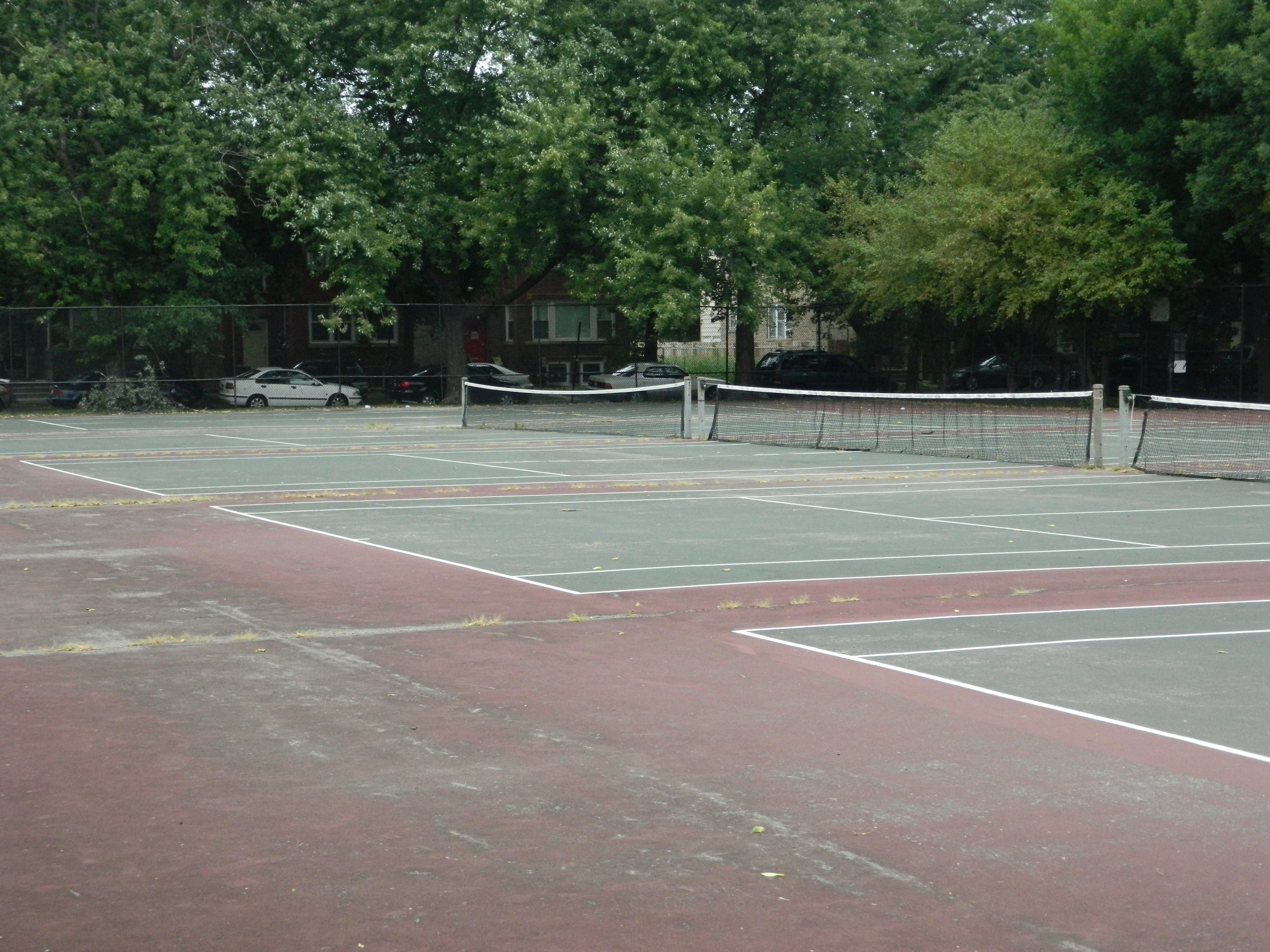
The park's tennis courts.

The park's tennis courts have been in the same location since c. 1925–1930. North of the five tennis courts is a playground. Historically, there were two playgrounds divided by an oval path; north of these areas were other recreation features, including a wading pool. During the 1950s the Chicago Park District renovated the playground area and added additional features including an open shelter, a sand court, wading pool and a basketball court. Between 1970 and 1980 the wading pool was converted into a spray feature. The playground equipment and area has had additional updates in the ensuing years.

North of the river is a more wide open landscape that features athletic fields used for soccer, football, baseball and softball. The park was one of 85 that the Chicago Park District highlighted in a 2008 brochure entitled "Nature in the City". The brochure noted Eugene Field Park for its access to the natural habitat of the "river's edge".

== Architecture ==
=== Field House ===
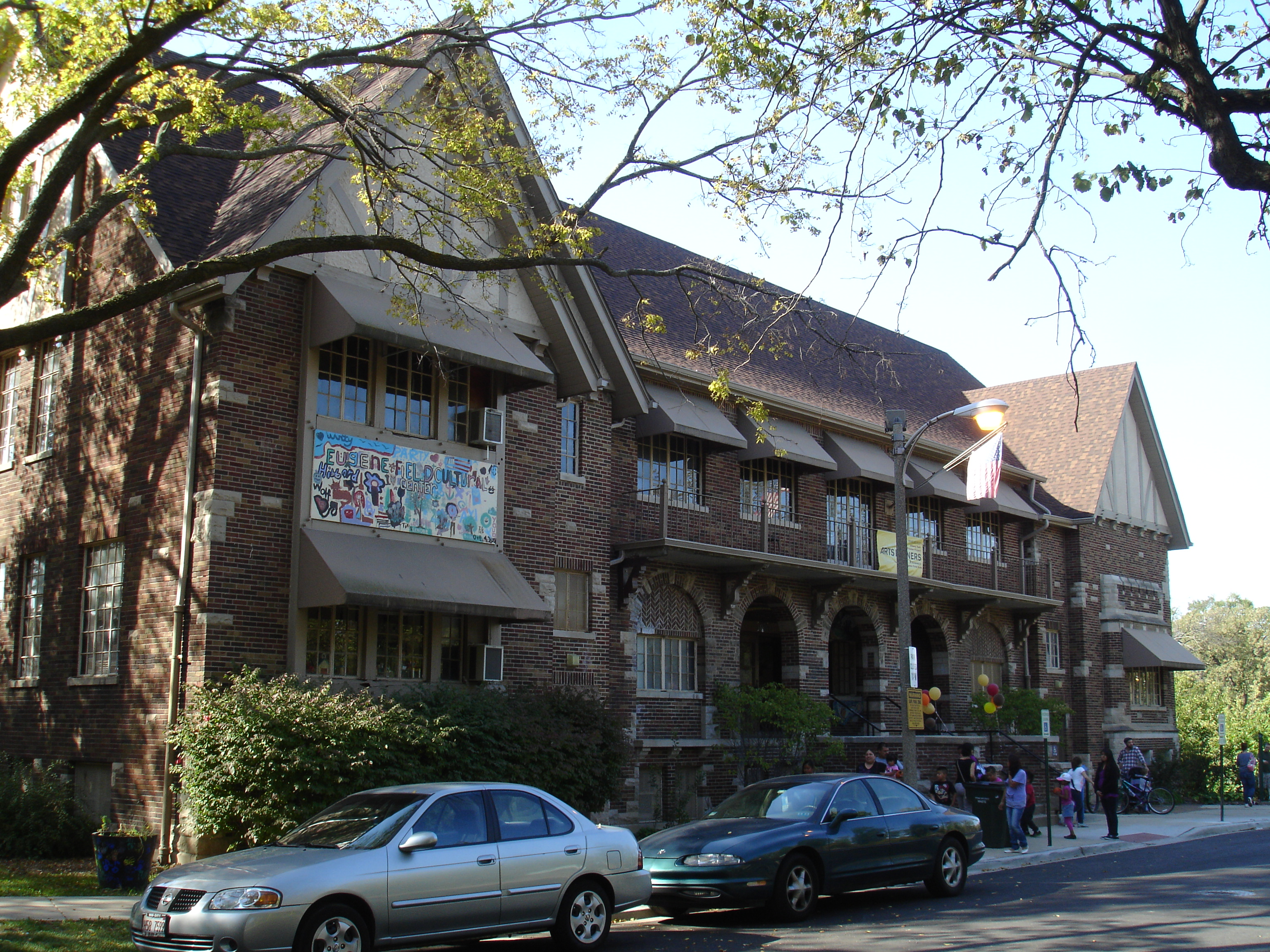
The Tudor Revival field house in 2012.

Clarence Hatzfeld designed the brick field house in 1928. It opened to the public in 1930 on a site south of the North Branch of the Chicago River. The building is designed in the Tudor Revival style and includes such stylistic elements as half-timbering, patterned brick and crenellated cornices.

The field house interior features terrazzo floors. In the auditorium are original light fixtures and the hallways feature decorative brackets. On the second story there is a marble niche for a drinking fountain. Additionally, the second floor houses two noteworthy paintings. There is a painting of Eugene Field that dates to 1941 and has the signature of its artist Joshua Holland. The other important painting is a mural that dates to the WPA time period entitled The Participation of Youth in the Realm of Fine Arts. The mural is believed to have been created by students in a Chicago Park District art class. The paintings were restored between 2001 and 2006 by the Chicago Conservation Center.

Directly in front of the field house is a circular driveway that dates to the 1930s, possibly earlier. This circular driveway connects with Ridgeway Avenue. In the past there was a fountain in the grassy "island" in the middle of the driveway. No longer extant, the fountain has been replaced by ornamental trees and several large boulders.

=== Landscape ===
Henry J. Stockmans drafted the original plans for Eugene Field Park. In addition to designing the field house, Hatzfeld also contributed recommendations about the development of the park. Stockmans' original plans no longer exist but in general his design philosophy followed the "naturalistic" tendencies of Jens Jensen. Jensen was superintendent of the West Chicago Parks Commission while Stockmans worked as foreman for that park district's landscape department during the early 1900s. Both men had worked together when they were among a group that advised the Horticultural Society of Chicago concerning the decor for their annual flower show.

=== Light tower and footbridges ===
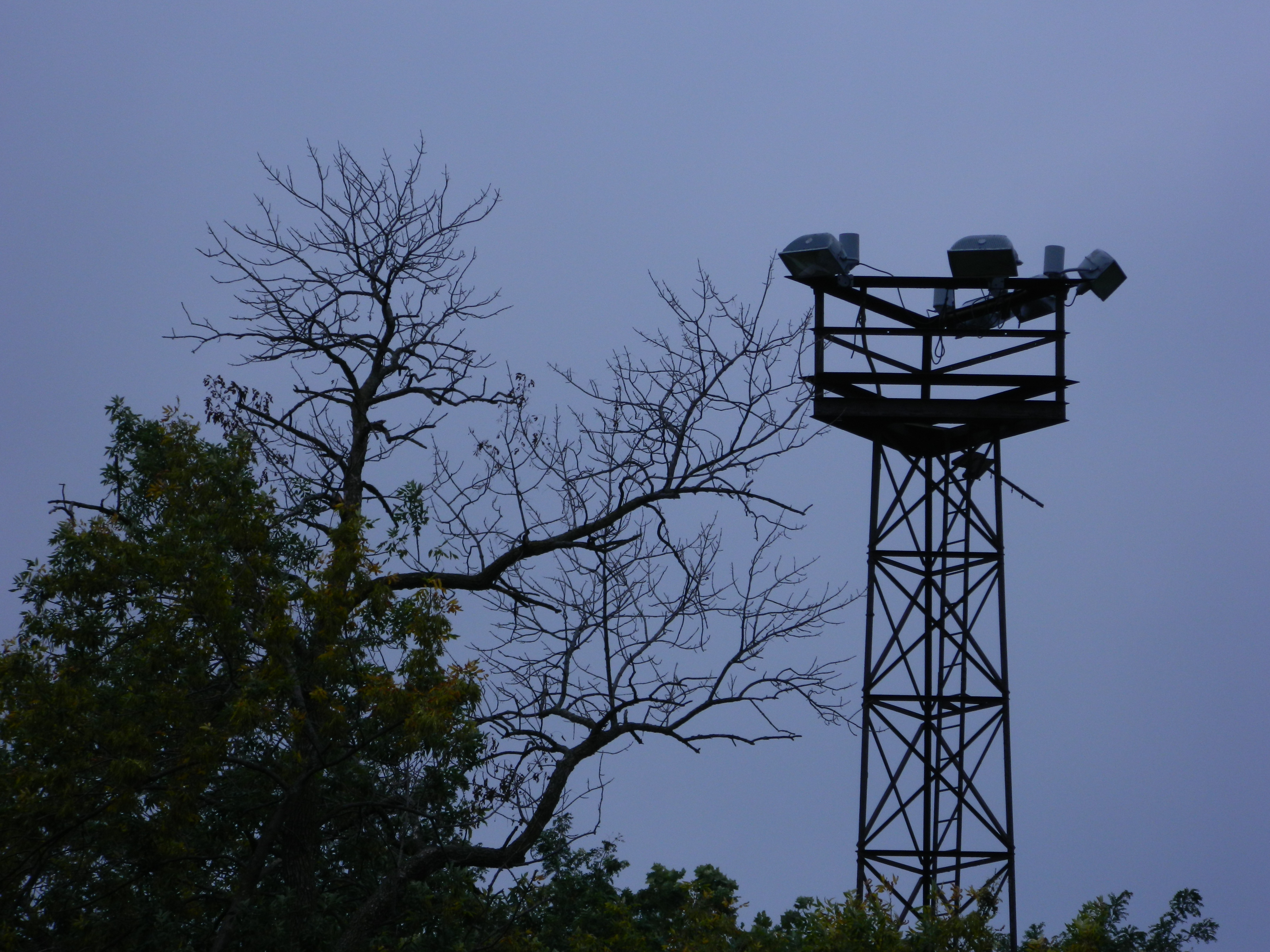
The 60 foot tall light tower that stood until 2025.

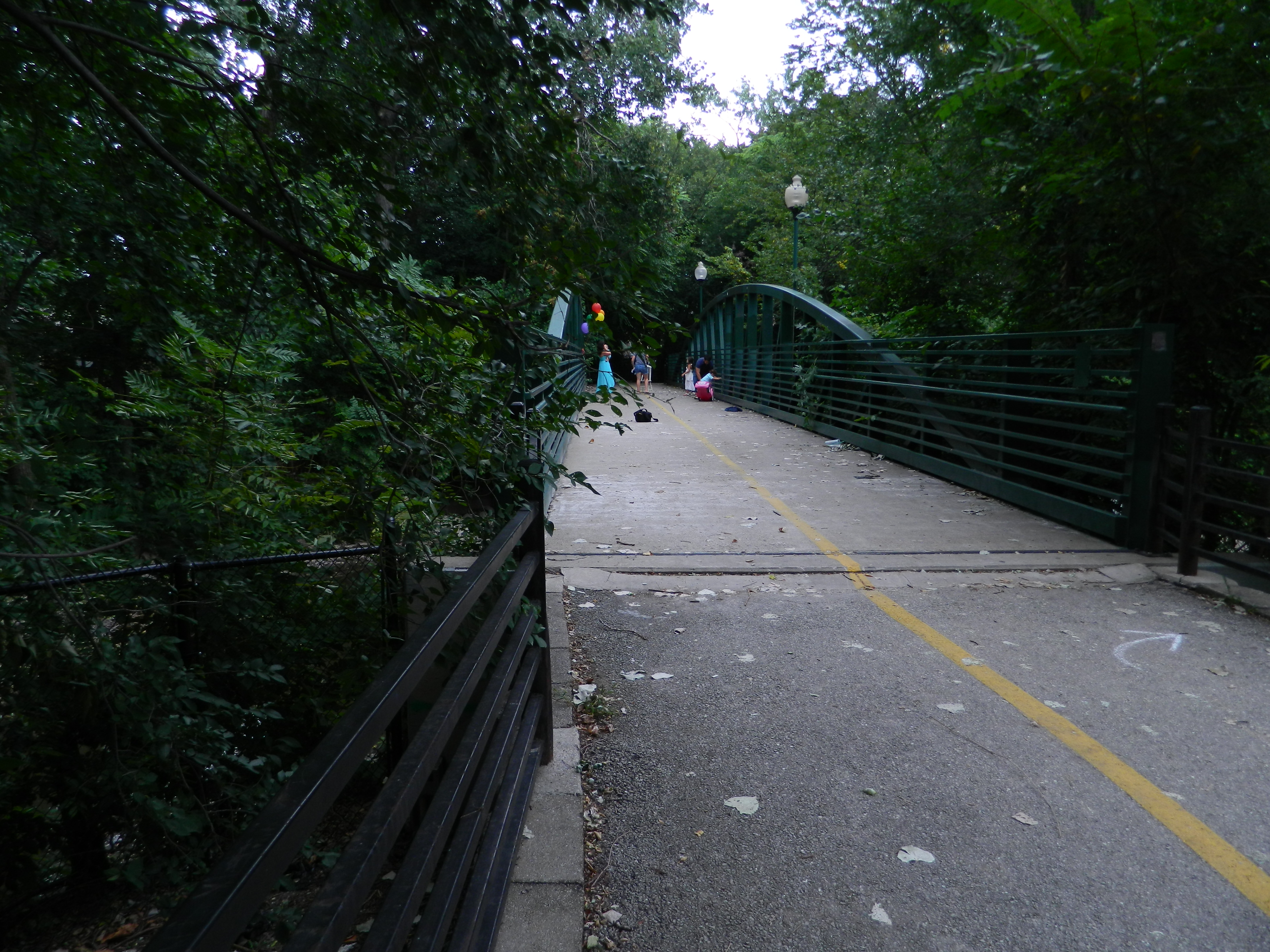
The 2003 Carmen Avenue Connector pedestrian bridge.

Eugene Field Park long featured a 60-foot flood light tower. The light tower was installed in 1937 by the Chicago Park District to provide lighting to recreation facilities northwest of the field house and south of the river. By 2025, the tower had had considerable rust damage and was removed after being blown over during a storm. Until the 1980s there was a flag pole and World War I memorial in the park to the west of the flood light tower. After it fell into disrepair the park district demolished the memorial.

There are two bridges within park boundaries. A footbridge over the Chicago River was designed by Hatzfeld in 1927 and opened in 1928. The original footbridge featured an arched wooden deck with metal support beams. Its original X-shaped rails were constructed from rough hewn lumber and at both the north and south ends of the bridge were covered shelters. When the Chicago Park District significantly rebuilt and altered the bridge in 1942, they kept the shelters intact. It is not known when the shelters were removed from the site. The park district undertook extensive reconstruction of the bridge again in 1995. While the original steel structure was maintained, the deck was replaced with asphalt and the railing replaced with chain link fencing.

The park's second bridge was constructed by the Chicago Park District in 2003. The historic hedge-lined double-oval pathway in the eastern part of the park was removed to make way for the new bridge. The new bridge, known as the Carmen Avenue Connector, joined a bicycle trail system that linked open spaces along the Chicago River, including River and Kiwanis Park east of Eugene Field and Gompers Park to the west. The Carmen Avenue Connector was, in part, funded through a grant from the State of Illinois. Issued in 1997 by then Governor Jim Edgar, the grant included $180,000 for the construction of the bridge as part of the Grand Illinois Trail.

== Significance ==
The U.S. National Register of Historic Places (NRHP) listed Eugene Field Park on August 8, 2006. The park is part of the NRHP Multiple Property Submission "Historic Resources of the Chicago Park District". Its National Register of Historic Places listing cited significance in the areas of architecture, entertainment/recreation and social history. For the purposes of the NRHP listing, there are 22 "resources" within Eugene Field Park. The resources consist of all of the main NRHP property types, building, site, object, and structure; of those 22 resources, 9 are considered non-contributing and 13 are considered contributing properties to the historic nature of the park.

== See also ==
- Dream Lady
- Eugene Field House (St. Louis)
- Parks in Chicago
