= North Mayfair, Chicago =

- North Mayfair Bungalow Historic District
- U.S. National Register of Historic Places
- U.S. Historic district
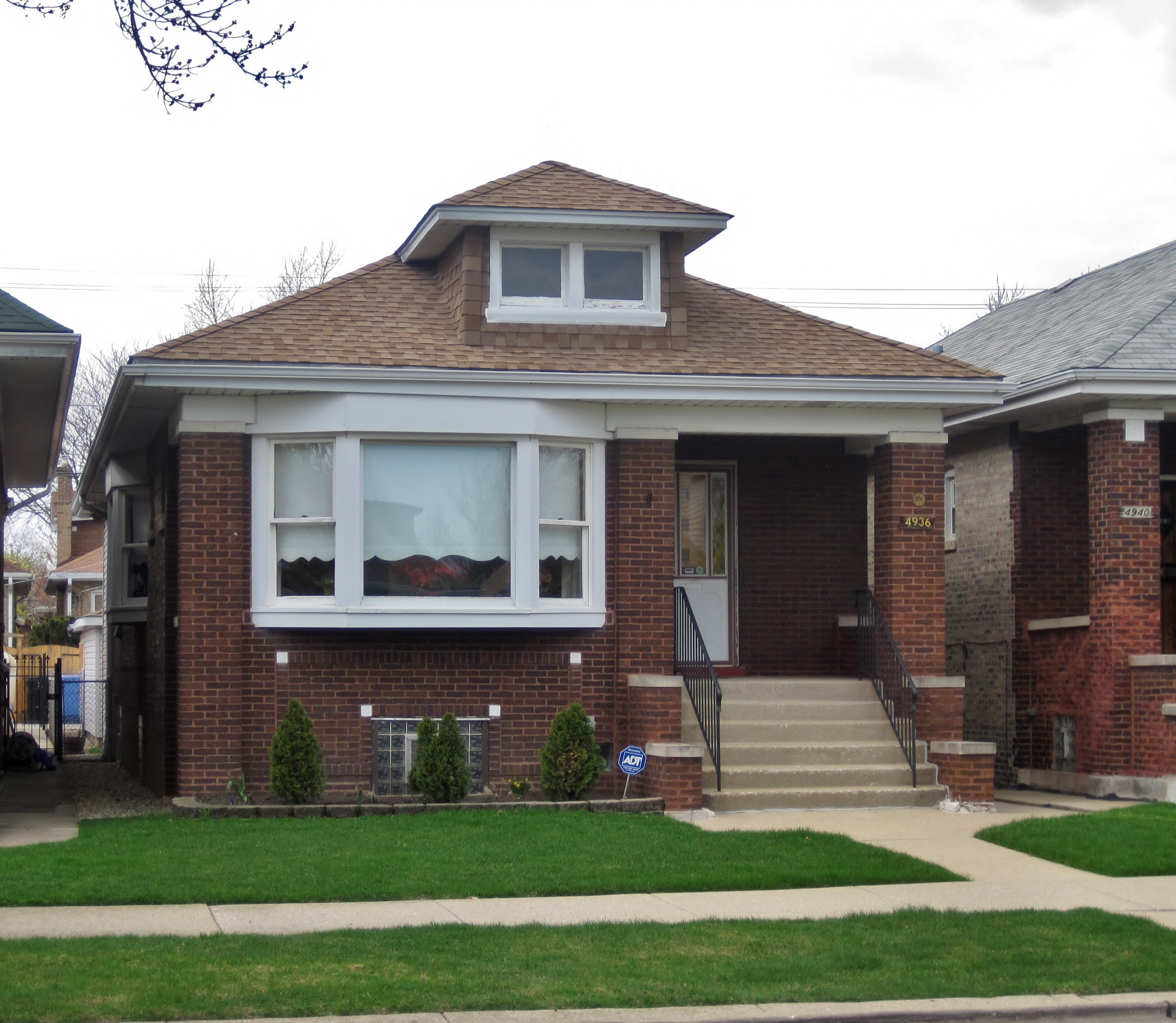
- Location: Roughly bounded by W. Foster Ave., N. Pulaski Rd., N. Kilbourn Ave., and W. Lawrence Ave., Chicago, Illinois
- Area: 140 acres (57 ha)
- Built: 1913
- Architect: Braucher, Ernest; et.al.
- Architectural style: Bungalow/craftsman
- MPS: Chicago Bungalows MPS
- NRHP reference No.: 05001608
- Added to NRHP: February 1, 2006

North Mayfair is a historic neighborhood in Far North Side, Chicago, Illinois. It is located within Albany Park on the city's Far North Side.

North Mayfair is renowned for its historic architecture. In 2010, This Old House Magazine listed North Mayfair as being one of the best "Old House" neighborhoods in the United States.

The entire North Mayfair neighborhood is listed on the National Register of Historic Places.

== Demographics and homeownership ==
Between 1913 and 1930, North Mayfair’s bungalows attracted working- and middle-class families from diverse ethnic backgrounds. More than one-third of the homes were owned by immigrant families, while many American-born household heads were children of immigrants. Residents commonly worked in skilled blue-collar and middle-class white-collar occupations, and some households included extended family members who contributed to household income.

== See also ==
- National Register of Historic Places listings in North Side Chicago
- Neighborhoods in Chicago
