= Henry Godinez =

Cuban-American actor, director, and professor of theatre

Henry Godinez (born August 4, 1958) is a Cuban-American actor, director, and professor of theatre who is committed to the production of Latino theatre in Chicago. He is the resident artistic associate at the Goodman Theatre, where he has directed and performed in multiple productions, and founded and serves as director of the Theatre's biennial Latino Theatre Festival. He is also the co-founder and former artistic director of Teatro Vista, a Latino theatre company in Chicago.

Outside Chicago, Godinez has directed and acted in New York City, Kansas City, Indiana, Colorado, Washington, D.C., and San Diego.

== Early years and education ==
Henry Godinez was born on August 4, 1958, in Havana, Cuba, the ninth of ten children in a middle-class family. Because his parents were worried about their children being enlisted in Castro's army, the family moved to the United States when Godinez was three years old. A year after the family arrived in the US they settled in Dallas, Texas.

Godinez became interested in theatre during a high school theatre class and went on to take part in rhetoric and declamation competitions, winning first place in a competition in Oklahoma during his junior year of high school. After high school Godinez studied theatre in his undergraduate years at the University of Dallas, graduating in 1980 and then working as an apprentice at The Actor's Theatre in Louisville, Kentucky. He furthered his theatre education by getting a Master of Fine Arts degree at the University of Wisconsin-Milwaukee's professional theatre training program.

Since then Godinez has worked as an actor, director, and professor of theatre, mainly in Chicago, focusing much of his work on Shakespeare and Latino theatre. Playing the role of Stefano in a college production of The Tempest made Godinez fall in love with Shakespeare, attracted by his huge characters and their enormous needs and energy. Godinez also found a connection between texts such as The Tempest and One Hundred Years of Solitude by Gabriel García Márquez, registering the magic present in both The Tempest and the works of many Latino writers and Latino cultures.

== Career ==
Godinez's commitment to producing Latino theatre was inspired during his time living in Logan Square, Chicago, a largely Cuban and Puerto Rican environment. After growing up with predominantly white friends and living in an area where racism wasn't uncommon, living in a Latino neighborhood for the first time gave him an awareness that he was representing the Latino community in the theatre world. Coupled with his frustration with the stereotypical casting of Latino actors it led him to want to make a change via his theatre work.

=== Teaching ===
Godinez has taught theatre at Columbia College Chicago (1994–2000) and DePaul University (2000–2006). Since 2006 he has worked at Northwestern University where he teaches courses in acting and other special topics, including Latino Theatre and Advanced Shakespeare. During the summer of 2016 Godinez led a Northwestern University study-abroad program to Havana, Cuba, during which students were able to collaborate with renowned theatre company Teatro Buendía to gain an understanding of the style of Cuban theatre and storytelling and foster new connections between Cuba and the United States.

=== Boards ===
Godinez serves or has served as a board member for several organizations in Chicago theatre. Most significantly, he is the co-founder and former artistic director (1990–1996) of Teatro Vista, founded with fellow actors Ramiro Carillo and Edward Torres as a response to plays by Latino playwrights not being produced. Their goal was to bridge the gap between Latino theatre and mainstream theatres, as well as reach the non-Latino communities of Chicago. Their first production was at the Pilsen Arts Center, now the National Museum of Mexican Art.

In addition to Teatro Vista, Godinez has served on the board of directors for the Illinois Arts Council Agency, Albany Park Theatre Project, and the Northwestern University Press. He is also the Resident Artistic Associate at the Goodman Theatre, having joined their Artistic Collective in 1997.

=== Acting ===
Godinez has performed on many stages, with his first role in Chicago after graduation being in Kabuki Medea (1983) at Wisdom Bridge Theatre. His love of Shakespeare has led him to perform in a number of productions at Chicago Shakespeare Theatre, including Hamlet, King Lear, Twelfth Night, Much Ado About Nothing, Henry V, Cymbeline, and King John. He also led Notre Dame Shakespeare Festival's 2014 production of Henry IV.

Godinez's Goodman Theatre credits include Romeo and Juliet (1988), A Christmas Carol (1988), The Rover (1989), Massacre (Sing to your Children) (2007), 2666 (2016), and a co-production of Pedro Páramo (2013) with Teatro Buendía. Other stage credits include Quixote: On the Conquest of Self (2017) at the Writers Theatre, as well as having performed at the Kennedy Center and the Old Globe Theatre.

Godinez has also appeared on screen, including in Above the Law (1988), The Beast (1988), The Package (1989), The Fugitive (1993), Boss (2011), The Chicago Code, (2011), Empire, and Chicago Fire.

=== Directing ===
Although initially an actor, Godinez has directed numerous productions for a range of companies over his career, including: Oak Park Festival Theatre (Macbeth); WBEZ Chicago Public Radio; Signature Theatre Company in New York City (Urban Zulu Mambo, 2001); Kansas Repertory Theatre (The Winter's Tale, 2002); Indiana Repertory Theatre; Colorado Shakespeare Festival (Romeo and Juliet, 1997); and Portland Center Stage (True West, 2002).

However, much of his work has been in Chicago, and at the Goodman Theatre Godinez has directed Cloud Tectonics (1995) in co-production with Teatro Vista; six of the annual productions of A Christmas Carol (1996–2001); Straight as a Line (1998); Millennium Mambo (2000); Zoot Suit (2000); Electricidad (2004); Mariela in the Desert (2005); The Cook (2007); Boleros for the Disenchanted (2009), which he also directed in its world premiere at Yale Repertory Theatre; The Sins of Sor Juana (2010); and Feathers and Teeth (2015).

At Teatro Vista, Godinez has directed Broken Eggs (1991); The Crossing (1991); Journey of the Sparrows (1996); Santos and Santos (1996); and El Paso Blue (1997).

Other Chicago productions Godinez has directed include Two Sisters and a Piano (2004) at Apple Tree Theatre; Anna in the Tropics (2005) at Victory Gardens Theatre; Esperanza Rising (2008), A Year With Frog and Toad (2013), and Last Stop on Market Street (2018) at Chicago Children's Theatre; A Civil War Christmas (2010) at Northlight Theatre; and End Days (2015) at Windy City Playhouse.

Godinez's university directing credits include Water By the Spoonful (2014) at the University of Chicago's Court Theatre, as well as Anna in the Tropics (2016) and In the Red and Brown Water (2017), both at Northwestern University's Josephine Louis Theatre.

== Publications ==
Godinez is co-editor of The Goodman Theatre's Festival Latino: Six Plays (2013) and has written for Latino USA.

== Awards ==
Godinez has been awarded the TCG Alan Schneider Directing Award (1999), the Distinguished Service Award by the Lawyers for the Creative Arts (2000), the Latino Professional of the Year Award by Chicago Latino Network (2008), and the Clarence Simon Award for Teaching and Mentoring (2013).
