= North Park, Chicago =

Community area in Chicago, Illinois

North Park
- Community area
- Community Area 13 – North Park
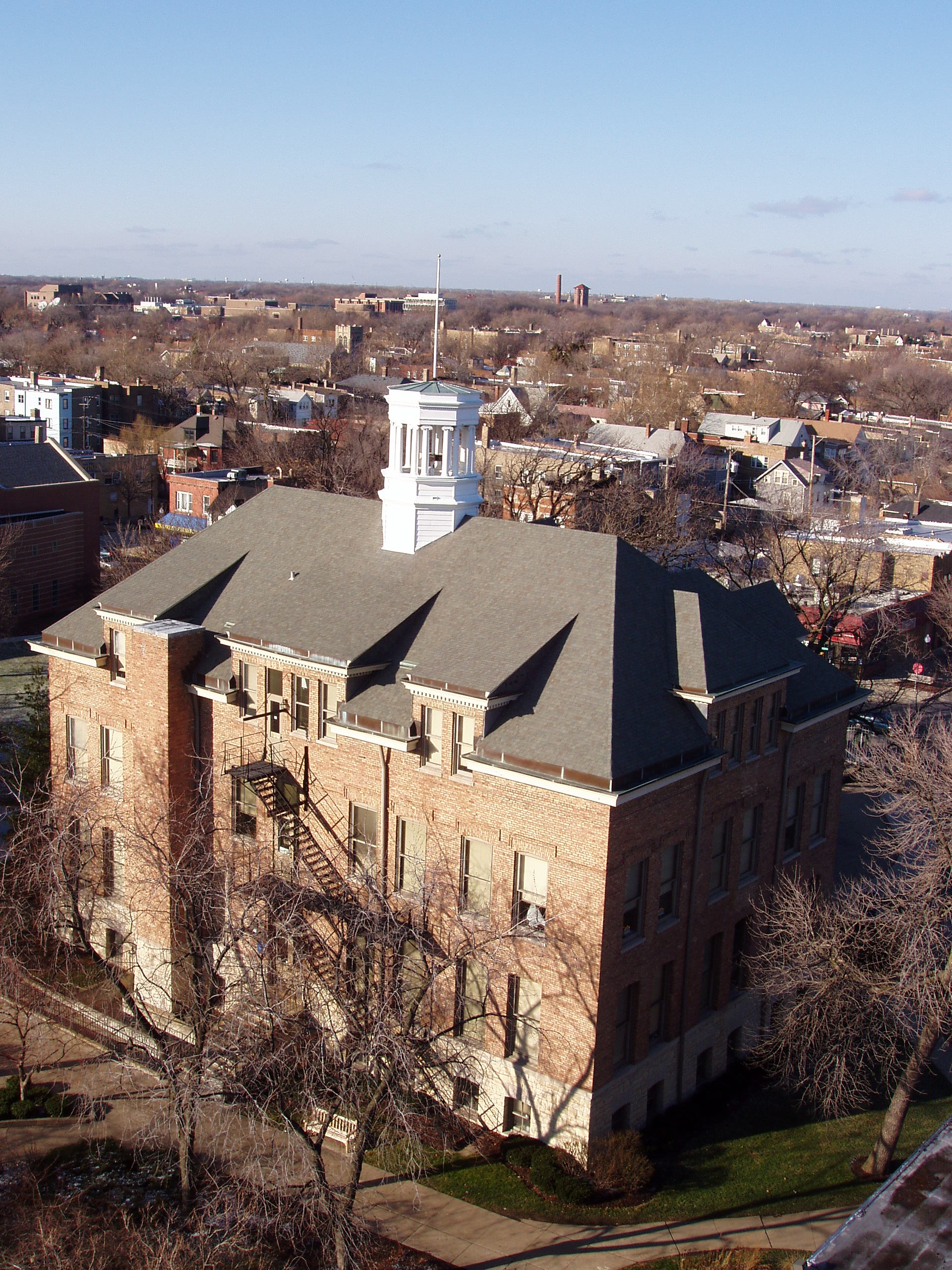
- North Park University, one of two universities in the neighborhood.

- Location within the city of Chicago
- Coordinates: 41°57′N 87°41′W
- Country: United States
- State: Illinois
- County: Cook
- City: Chicago
- Named for: North Park University
- Neighborhoods: list: Hollywood Park; North Park; Pulaski Park; Brynford Park; River's Edge; Sauganash Woods; Sauganash; West Rogers Park; Albany Park; North Mayfair

Area
  - Total: 2.07 sq mi (5.36 km^{2})

Population (2024)
  - Total: 18,356
  - Density: 8,870/sq mi (3,420/km^{2})

Demographics 2024
  - White: 44.8%
  - Black: 5.6%
  - Hispanic: 16.5%
  - Asian: 29.4%
  - Other: 3.7%
- Time zone: UTC-6 (CST)
  - Summer (DST): UTC-5 (CDT)
- ZIP Codes: parts of 60625, 60646, 60659
- Median household income: $56,287
- Source: U.S. Census, Record Information Services

North Park is one of the 77 community areas of Chicago in Illinois, United States. It is bordered by the North Shore Channel on the east, the Chicago River's North Branch and Foster Avenue on the south, it reaches as far as Cicero Avenue on the west and Devon Avenue on the north. To its north is the Chicago city limit and Lincolnwood, Illinois.

== Neighborhood ==
Historical population
Census	Pop.	Note	%±
1930	11,052		—
1940	12,271		11.0%
1950	15,291		24.6%
1960	17,866		16.8%
1970	16,732		−6.3%
1980	15,273		−8.7%
1990	16,236		6.3%
2000	18,514		14.0%
2010	17,931		−3.1%
2020	17,559		−2.1%

Originally a Swedish community and later a stronghold of Orthodox Jews, it is generally a broadly mixed community of various backgrounds. It is part of the 60625 and 60659 zip codes.

North Park received its name from North Park University which built its Old Main building in 1894 along Foster Avenue west of Kedzie, on the north bank of the river. Further west is the campus of Northeastern Illinois University, which opened in 1961. Other major land uses include two large cemeteries, LaBagh Woods Forest Preserve, Peterson Pulaski Industrial Park, and North Park Village, which includes housing, park facilities, and a nature center.

The Good Counsel Province of the Polish Felician Sisters is headquartered in this neighborhood, as is Chicago's PBS station, WTTW, in the Chicago Production Center. Two universities – North Park University and Northeastern Illinois University – and a Yeshiva make for concentrated educational resources. The closest CTA 'L' station is the Kimball Brown Line terminal.

North Park is in Jefferson Township, which was annexed into Chicago in 1889.

== Economy ==
The Korean-American Chamber of Commerce is located at 5601 North Spaulding Avenue.

The education section of the Consulate-General of the People's Republic of China in Chicago is located at 3322 West Peterson Avenue, several blocks away from the rest of the consulate at 4747 West Peterson Avenue.

== Politics ==
The North Park community area has overwhelmingly supported the Democratic Party in recent presidential elections. In the 2016 presidential election, North Park cast 4,897 votes (70.02%) for Hillary Clinton and cast 1,799 votes (25.72%) for Donald Trump. In the 2012 presidential election, North Park cast 4,563 votes (66.40%) for Barack Obama and cast 2,199 votes for Mitt Romney (32.00%).

== Notable people ==
- Seymour Simon (1915–2006), politician who served as President of the Cook County Board of Commissioners and a Justice of the Illinois Supreme Court. He resided in the Hollywood Park neighborhood for many years.

== Schools ==
=== Public ===
==== Elementary ====
- Mary G Peterson Elementary School
- Hannah G Solomon Elementary School

==== High school ====
- CICS Northtown Academy
- Northside Learning Center
- Northside College Prep
- Von Steuben Metropolitan High School

=== Private ===
==== Elementary ====
- St Bernadette School
- Joan Dachs Bais Yaakov
- Wonder Montessori School

==== High school ====
- Bais Yaakov High School
- Telshe High School

=== Higher education ===
- North Park University
- North Park Theological Seminary
- Northeastern Illinois University
- Telshe Yeshiva

== Library ==
- Albany Park Library

== See also ==
- Chicago Public Schools
