= Friedman Place =

Nonprofit organization in Chicago, Illinois

Friedman Place is a 501(c)(3) nonprofit organization for blind adults in Chicago, Illinois. A Supportive Living Facility with 81 resident apartments, Friedman Place provides specialized housing to qualifying individuals regardless of race, religion, or financial resources. The organization's mission is to provide housing and supportive services to people who are blind or visually impaired so that their lives can be healthy, dignified, and stimulating.

Friedman Place offers a large variety of activities, from sailing and opera outings to an in-house weaving program

Friedman Place relies on funding from state and federal sources, as well as personal donations. The organization produces The Beacon, a quarterly newsletter, as well as an annual report.
