= Nancy Faust =

American musician (born 1947)

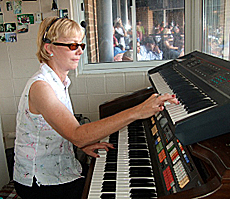
- Faust in September 2010
- Born: March 11, 1947 (age 79); Chicago, Illinois, U.S.
- Education: North Park University
- Occupation: Organist for Chicago White Sox
- Years active: 1970–2010
- Spouse: Joe Jenkins
- Children: 1

Nancy Faust (born March 11, 1947) is an American former stadium organist for Major League Baseball's Chicago White Sox.

== Biography ==
=== Early life ===
Faust grew up in the Chicago area, and began playing the organ at age 4 by learning from her mother, Jacquin, also a professional musician. She was also proficient at playing the accordion. After graduating from Theodore Roosevelt High School, she received a bachelor's degree in psychology from North Park University. During high school and college, she would often fill in for her mother at various engagements.

=== Chicago White Sox ===
After college, she chose to seek work playing at sporting events for a year before beginning an intended teaching career. She was hired to succeed Bob Creed as the White Sox organist for the 1970 season by general manager Stu Holcomb, who had seen her perform at a banquet. Her original perch at Comiskey Park was an organ booth that was established in the center field bleachers in 1960 by Bill Veeck to encourage fan interaction. Almost immediately, Faust became arguably the first sports organist to include pop and rock themes while playing during the games. Tying creative tunes from TV commercials or popular songs to various players and game situations – not to mention her musicianship – she made a name for herself, becoming a major entertainment force at both the old Comiskey Park and the new Comiskey (renamed U.S. Cellular Field in 2003, then renamed Guaranteed Rate Field in 2016, then renamed Rate Field in 2024). She is credited with beginning the MLB tradition of walk-up music for individual players through her playing of "Jesus Christ Superstar" whenever White Sox player Dick Allen was at the plate.

In the 1970s, Faust – along with announcers Harry Caray and Jimmy Piersall, plus Andy the Clown – became great crowd favorites at Comiskey Park. Usually, when fans think of Caray singing "Take Me Out to the Ball Game" they think of the Chicago Cubs, but many remember that it was Faust, whose arrangement got Caray so inspired he would bellow the song out loud to himself, who inaugurated this tradition. Owner Bill Veeck put a public address microphone on Caray, turning him into a cultural icon. Caray later moved from Comiskey to the Wrigley Field press box, taking the tradition with him.

=== Other teams ===
Though most commonly associated with the White Sox, Faust also played for other teams. She was the organist for the Chicago Bulls from 1975 to 1984, playing an organ set up at courtside, and for the Chicago Blackhawks from 1984 to 1989, playing Chicago Stadium's 3,663-pipe Barton pipe organ at hockey games.

=== Honors and recognition ===
Having become the team's "key player," Faust found herself appearing on ABC's Good Morning America and written up in Sports Illustrated as baseball's "MVO, or Most Valuable Organist", among other accolades. She was even awarded a RIAA gold record from Mercury Records, whose sales of the 1969 pop tune "Na Na Hey Hey Kiss Him Goodbye" skyrocketed after Nancy's version took the sports world by storm.

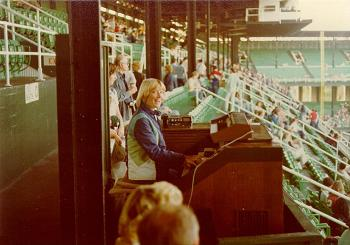
Nancy Faust at Comiskey Park on May 21, 1980

Fans enjoyed being able to visit Faust during games and offer suggestions – first in her open-air position in Comiskey Park's upper deck, and later in a booth behind home plate at U.S. Cellular Field. Aside from the Sox (1970–2010), Bulls (1976–1984) and Blackhawks (1984–1989), she was organist for the Sting pro soccer team (1975–1988) and DePaul University Blue Demons basketball (1977–1981). Many other teams sent their own organists to take notes and have occasionally brought in Faust to perform at their own games. The NHL's Minnesota North Stars hired her for the 1987 to 1989 seasons for games that didn't conflict with her Blackhawks duties, and the Phoenix Coyotes hired her for three games in February 2008.

The 2009 season was Faust's 40th as the Sox organist, and her approach to playing music at a baseball game remained the standard. Faust missed only five scheduled dates in her career – the result of giving birth – and she did not miss any from 1983 through 2005, including the 2005 World Series, which the White Sox won. Starting with the 2006 season, she decided to cut back and only perform at daytime games.

Her "Na Na Hey Hey Goodbye" theme is now imitated by other teams and fans all over the world. Faust's talents have been recognized in a new exhibit at the Baseball Hall of Fame called "Women in Baseball." She was also a featured performer for the Chicago Symphony Orchestra upon clinching of the 2005 American League pennant.

In October 2009, Faust announced that the 2010 baseball season would be her final season behind the keyboard.

Ten thousand Nancy Faust bobblehead dolls were presented to fans by the White Sox before their game on September 18, 2010, at then-U.S. Cellular Field, with a ceremony held by the team in her honor. Faust was also profiled in a feature story in that day's New York Times. On Sunday, October 3, 2010, Nancy played her last game at U.S. Cellular.

Nancy played during the Kane County Cougars' "Night of 100 Promotions" in 2011, and returned to Fifth Third Bank Ballpark to play at select Cougars games from 2012 to 2015.

Faust was inducted into the Baseball Reliquary's Shrine of the Eternals in 2018.

Since 2022, Nancy Faust has contributed organ solo pieces to the podcast edition of Countdown with Keith Olbermann. Host Keith Olbermann frequently refers to her in closing credits as "the best baseball stadium organist ever".

Faust is prominently featured in the 2023 documentary Last Comiskey, which includes live footage of her playing the organ at Comiskey Park, as well as interviews she gave from home. Faust also contributed music for the film.

In 2025, as part of the celebration of the 125th anniversary of the Chicago White Sox, she played at six games at Rate Field, where the organist booth is now named for her.

== Personal life ==
Faust is married to Joe Jenkins and has a son, Eric. Faust missed only five White Sox games in her career, and those were due to the birth of her son.

Bill Veeck used to have what Faust called "wacky promotions" and door prizes at White Sox games. Once, a door prize was a live donkey, which the winning fan did not claim. Veeck said he was going to return it, but Faust told him she would take it. Now, she has two pet donkeys that she also trains.

== Quotes ==
She can play everything. Musically, she's pretty awesome. There are a lot of songs she'll throw in there that I don't think a lot of people get. Me, being a music fan, and guys like Scott, we'll laugh.

— Former Sox pitcher and rock musician Jack McDowell

== See also ==
- Women in baseball
