= Theodore Roosevelt High School (Illinois) =

Roosevelt High School
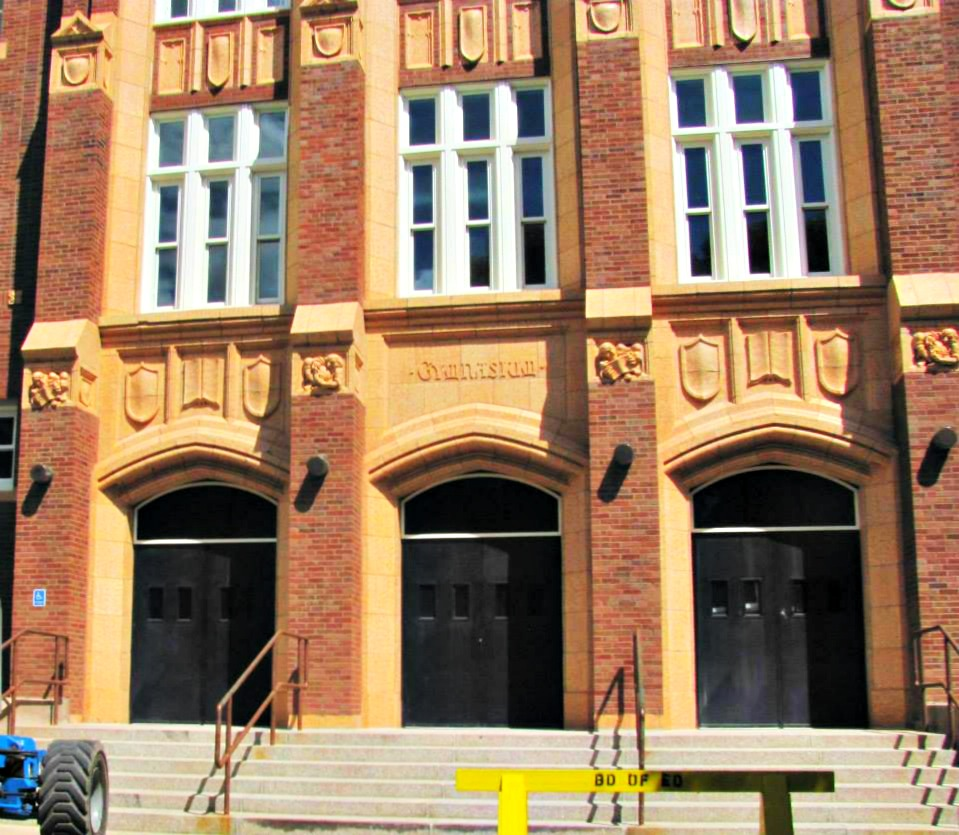
- Southwest entrance, 2014.

Location
- 3436 W. Wilson Avenue; Chicago, Illinois 60625; United States; 41.9650°N 87.7146°W

Information
- School type: Public; Secondary
- Opened: 1922
- School district: Chicago Public Schools
- CEEB code: 141105
- Principal: Dr. Daniel Kramer, Ed.D
- Grades: 9–12
- Gender: Coed
- Enrollment: 1,016 (2024–2025)
- Average class size: 25
- Campus size: 356,482 ft²
- Campus type: Urban
- Colors: Blue; Gold
- Song: "Go Rough Riders Go"
- Athletics conference: Chicago Public League
- Team name: Rough Riders
- Accreditation: North Central Association of Colleges and Schools
- Newspaper: The Rider Flyer
- Yearbook: The Roosevelt Log
- Website: rhsroughriders.org

Theodore Roosevelt High School (TRHS or RHS) is a public 4–year high school in the Albany Park neighborhood on the northwest side of Chicago, Illinois, United States. The school is operated by the Chicago Public Schools district. Roosevelt opened and began existence in 1922 as William G. Hibbard High School, but was moved into a new building and renamed in honor of the 26th president of the United States in 1927.

== Athletics ==
Roosevelt competes in the Chicago Public League (CPL) and is a member of the Illinois High School Association (IHSA). 1952 was a banner year in basketball with the city championship over Tilden Tech, while the tennis team defeated Senn High School for its championship, Donald "Tootsie" Kerbis being the captain of the Roosevelt Netmen. The boys' football team were public league champions in 1960–61 under the leadership of coach Al Klein. 1976 Section Champions 7-1 Captains Rick Stinson and Joe Fiorentino.

== Notable alumni ==
- Nelson Algren, author (The Man with the Golden Arm, Chicago: City on the Make, A Walk on the Wild Side).
- George Baker, cartoonist
- Russell A. Berg, U.S. Air Force Brigadier General
- Jerry Bresler (1932), musician, composer, and orchestra conductor. Wrote the school song Go Rough Riders Go in 1931 at the age of 17
- Max Demián (2005), performance artist
- Nancy Faust, stadium organist for 40 years for the Chicago White Sox
- Joe Fiorentino, Martial Arts Champion, 15-time North American Grappling Champion, United States Martial Arts Hall of Fame, 2013 Ellis Island Medal of Honor
- Carl Foreman, Academy Award–winning screenwriter and film director (High Noon, The Bridge on the River Kwai, The Guns of Navarone).
- George Gobel, comedian and actor (The George Gobel Show)
- Irean Gordon, painter (1929)
- Cecil Heftel, member of the United States House of Representatives from Hawaii's 1st congressional district (1977–1986).
- Milt Holland, session drummer and percussionist based in Los Angeles
- Adolph Kiefer, Olympic swimming champion (1936), Navy vet, inventor and businessman
- Leo Melamed, former chairman of the Chicago Mercantile Exchange and creator of the International Monetary Market. He is a pioneer in the field of currency futures
- Atour Sargon, Assyrian American activist, first ethnic Assyrian elected to the Lincolnwood board of trustees
- George Schmidt, former NFL defensive end (Green Bay Packers, Chicago Cardinals)
- Shel Silverstein, poet (Where the Sidewalk Ends, A Light in the Attic, The Giving Tree) and Grammy Award–winning songwriter ("A Boy Named Sue")
- Ed Short, radio executive, Chicago White Sox general manager 1961–70
- Seymour Simon, politician and judge who served as an Associate Justice of the Illinois Supreme Court (1980–88)
- Bob Sirott, Chicago television and radio personality
- Alvin Weinberg, nuclear physicist, pioneer of the molten salt reactor, and administrator at Oak Ridge National Laboratory
