= Montrose Avenue =

Street in Chicago

- 4400 North
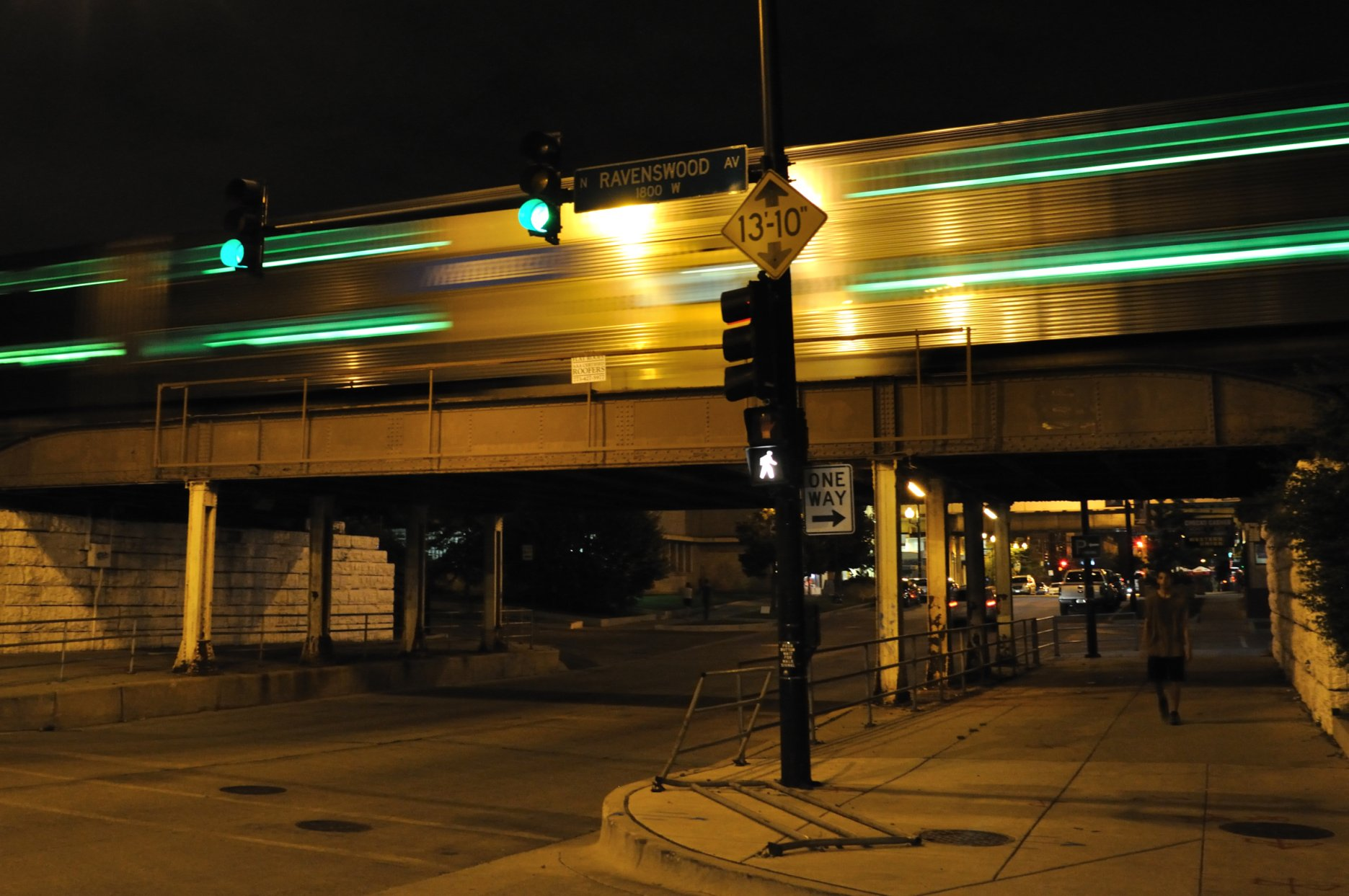
- Montrose Avenue crossing under Metra's Union Pacific North Line (2010)
- Location: Wood Dale, Schiller Park, Norridge, Harwood Heights, Chicago
- West end: Mill Road in Wood Dale
- East end: Simonds Drive/Montrose Harbor Drive in Chicago

Montrose Avenue is a street in Chicago. Located 5.5 miles (8.9 km) north of Madison Street, it is 4400N in Chicago's grid system. Montrose Avenue serves as the northern boundary line for Chicago's Lakeview, North Center, and Irving Park neighborhoods, as well as the southern boundary line for Uptown, Lincoln Square, and Albany Park.

It is served by stations on the Chicago Transit Authority (CTA)'s Brown Line and Blue Line and Metra's Milwaukee District North Line. The CTA also provides the #78 Montrose bus on the street.
