= Paulina station =

Chicago "L" station

Paulina 1700W 3400N
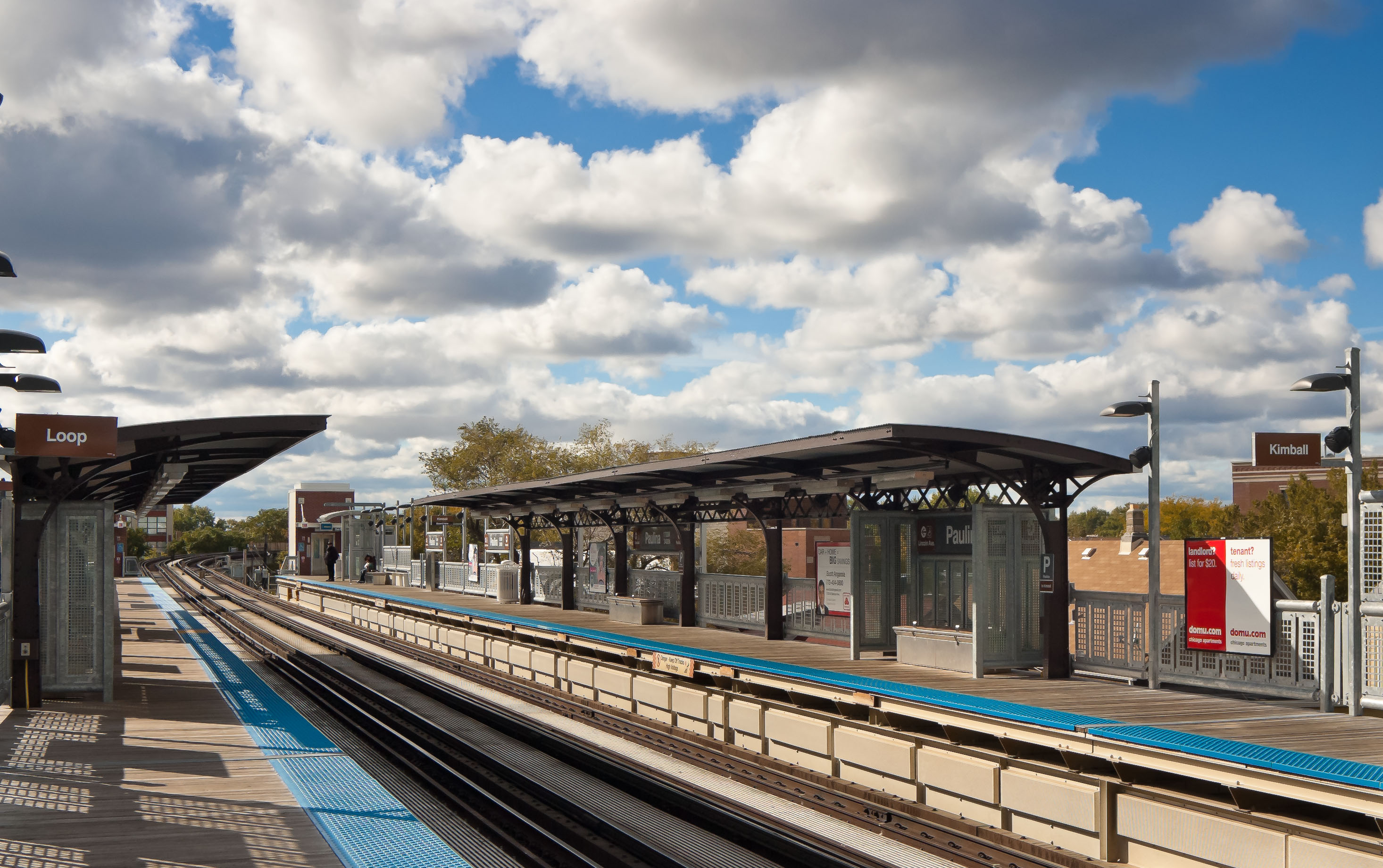
- Platforms at Paulina station

General information
- Location: 3410 North Lincoln Avenue; Chicago, Illinois 60657
- Coordinates: 41.943722°N 87.670858°W
- Owner: Chicago Transit Authority
- Line: Ravenswood branch
- Platforms: 2 side platforms
- Tracks: 2

Construction
- Structure type: Elevated
- Cycle facilities: Yes
- Accessible: Yes

History
- Opened: May 18, 1907; 119 years ago
- Closed: September 2, 1973; 52 years ago – October 17, 1973; 52 years ago
- Rebuilt: 2008–2009; 17 years ago
- Former names: Paulina/Lincoln (station sign)

Passengers
- 2025: 542,278 ▲2.9%

Services
Preceding station	Chicago "L"	Following station
Addison toward Kimball	Brown Line	Southport toward Loop (Washington/Wells)
Track layout
Location

Paulina is an 'L' station on the Chicago Transit Authority's Brown Line. It is an elevated station with two side platforms, located at 3410 North Lincoln Avenue (3400 N; 1700 W), in Chicago's Lakeview neighborhood, close to Roscoe Village. The stations that are adjacent to Paulina are Addison, about three-eighths of a mile (0.60 of a km) to the northwest and Southport, about three-eighths of a mile (0.60 of a km) to the east.

== History ==
Paulina Station opened in 1907 as part of the Northwestern Elevated Railroad's Ravenswood branch. The station closed on September 2, 1973, but reopened on October 17 of the same year. Upon reopening, the station was only open on weekdays from 6:30 AM to 6:30 PM. On November 29, 1987, the station returned to full operational status and was open at all times the Ravenswood Line operated.

=== Brown Line Capacity Expansion Project ===
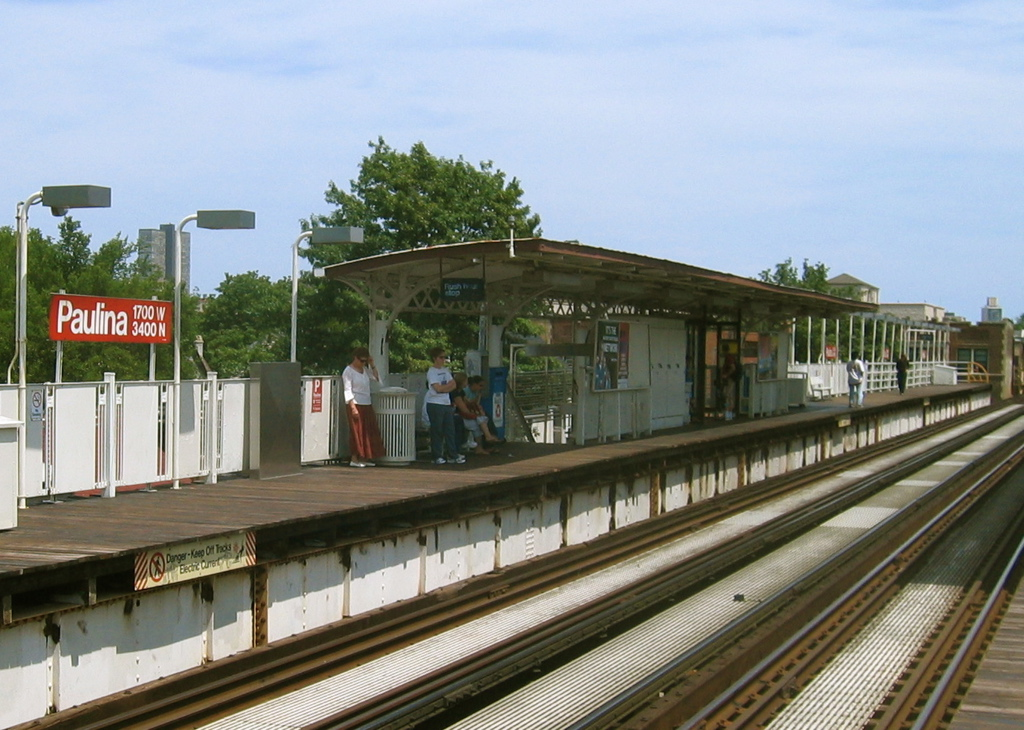
Paulina prior to reconstruction, July 2006

As part of the Brown Line Capacity Expansion Project, the platform was expanded to allow eight car trains to stop at the station, relieving overcrowding during morning rush hour. Along with other Brown Line stations, Paulina was also rebuilt to become accessible to passengers with disabilities. As part of this project, Paulina station closed on March 30, 2008, for demolition and replacement with a new station. The new station opened on April 3, 2009.
