= Southport station (CTA) =

Chicago "L" station

Southport 1400W 3400N
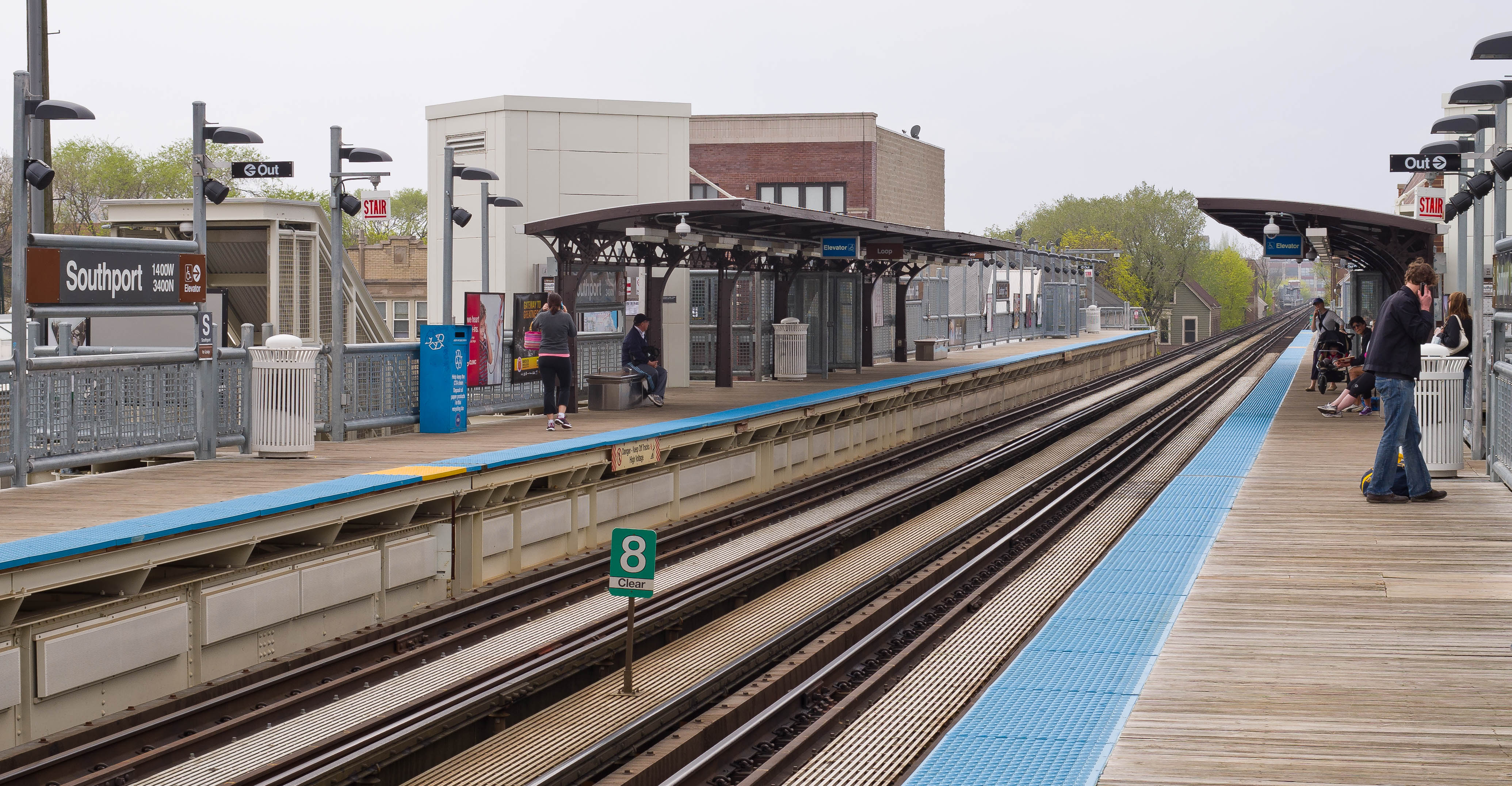
- The platforms at Southport

General information
- Location: 3411 North Southport Avenue; Chicago, Illinois 60657
- Coordinates: 41.943832°N 87.663383°W
- Owner: Chicago Transit Authority
- Line: Ravenswood branch
- Platforms: 2 side platforms
- Tracks: 2

Construction
- Structure type: Elevated
- Cycle facilities: Yes
- Accessible: Yes

History
- Opened: May 18, 1907; 119 years ago
- Rebuilt: 2007–2008; 18 years ago

Passengers
- 2025: 751,549 ▲8.1%

Services
Preceding station	Chicago "L"	Following station
Paulina toward Kimball	Brown Line	Belmont toward Loop (Washington/Wells)
Track layout
Location

Southport is a station on the Chicago Transit Authority's 'L' system. It is situated between the Paulina and Belmont stations on the Brown Line, which runs between Albany Park on Chicago's Northwest Side and downtown Chicago. It is an elevated station with two side platforms located at 3411 North Southport Avenue in Chicago's Lakeview community area.

== Location ==
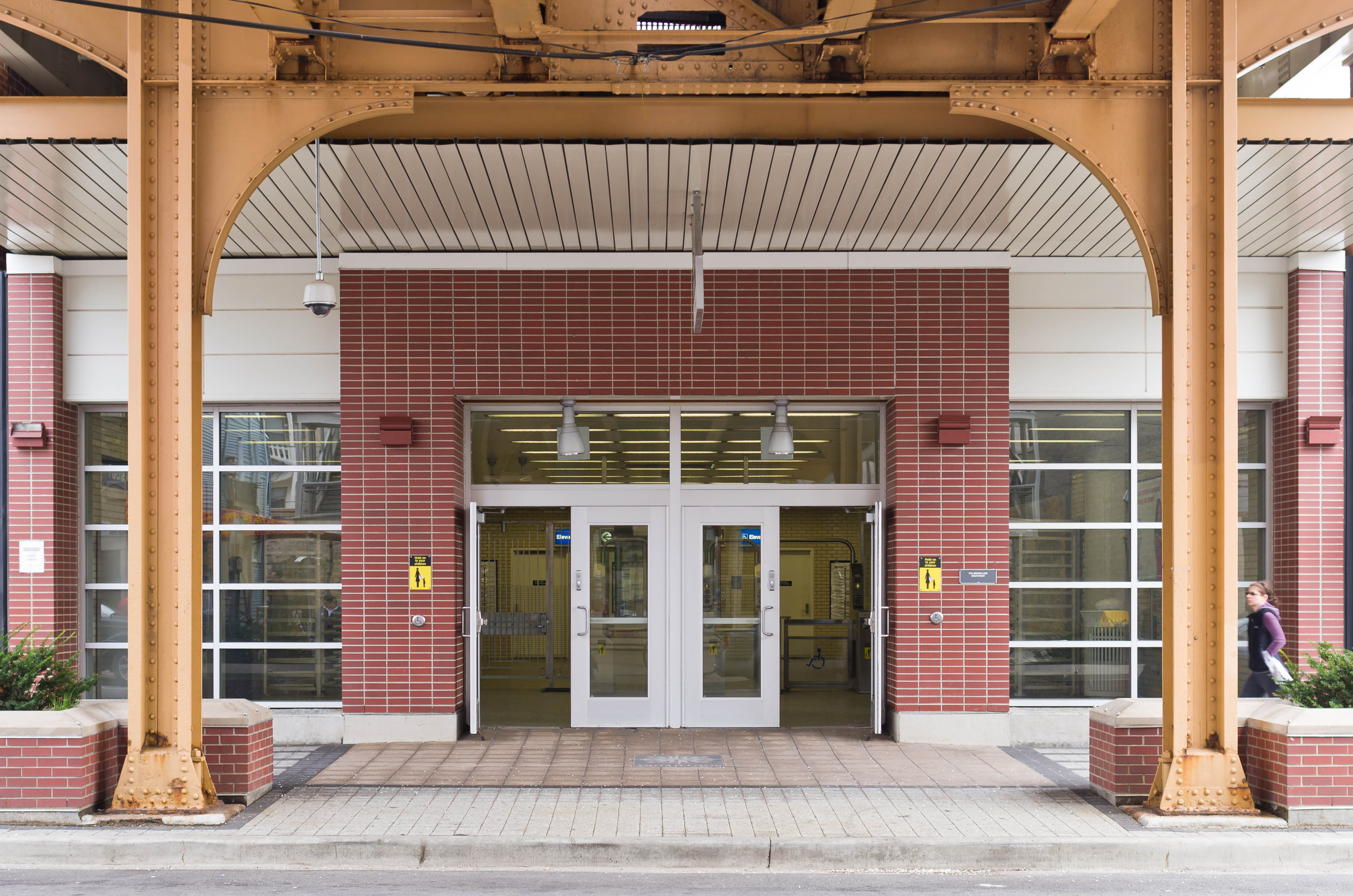
Southport station entrance

Southport is situated on North Southport Avenue, close to its intersection with West Roscoe Street. The station is located in the Lakeview community area of Chicago; the area surrounding the station consists of a mixture commercial and residential areas.

== History ==
Southport Station opened in 1907 as part of the Northwestern Elevated Railroad's Ravenswood line. In CTA's skip-stop service on the Brown Line, which was in operation from 1949 to 1995, Southport was a "B" station.

In 2006, the CTA began the Brown Line Capacity Expansion Project, which involved the renovation and reconstruction of all Brown Line stations to allow eight car trains to run on the line and to ensure that all stations are accessible to passengers with disabilities. Southport Station was closed between April 2, 2007, and March 30, 2008, and was completely rebuilt.

== Services ==
Southport is part of the CTA's Brown Line, which runs between Albany Park and downtown Chicago. It is the eleventh inbound station and is the last station on the Ravenswood branch. Brown Line trains serve Southport between 4:00 a.m. and 2:25 a.m. on Weekdays and Saturdays, and between 5:00 a.m. and 2:00 a.m. on Sundays; trains operate every 3 to 10 minutes during rush hour, with longer headways of up to 15 minutes at night. 1,042,720 passengers boarded at Southport in 2015.
