= Western station (CTA Brown Line) =

Chicago "L" station

Western 2400W 4700N
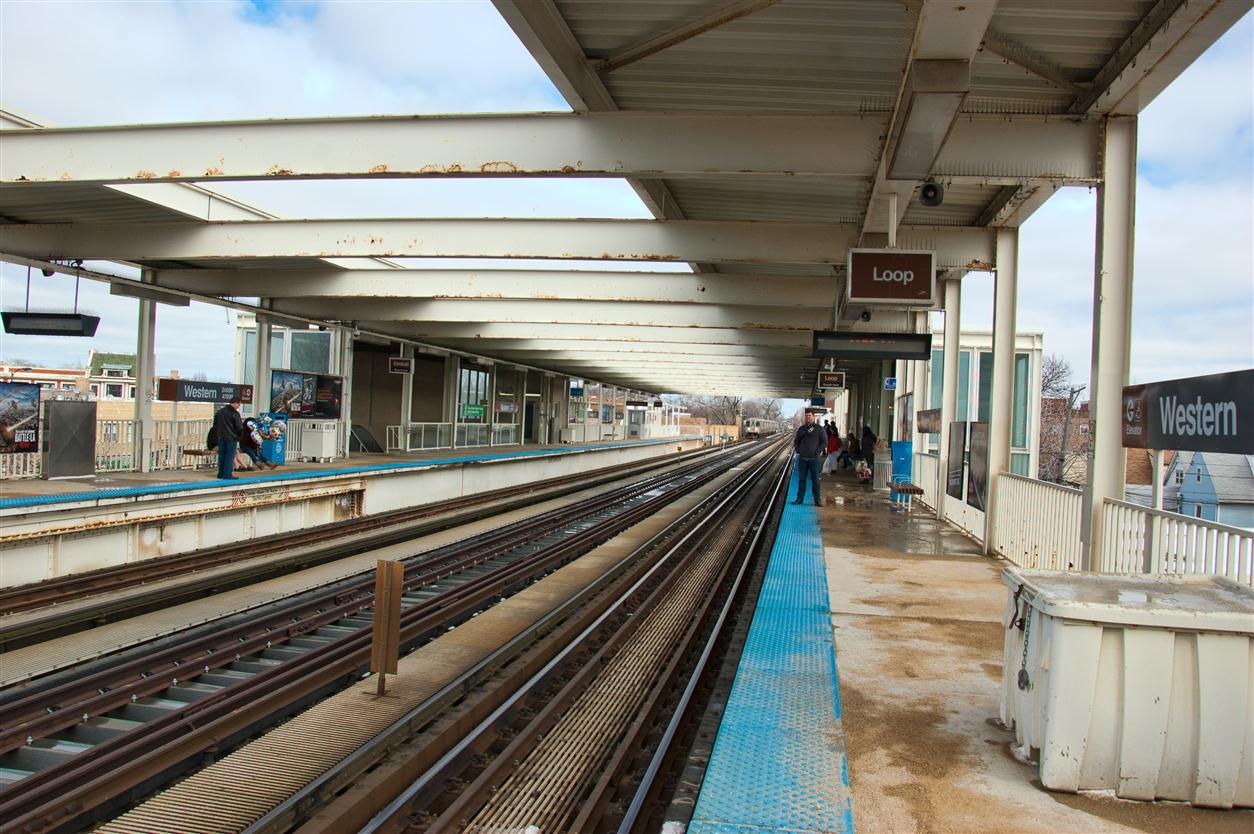

General information
- Location: 4648 North Western Avenue; Chicago, Illinois 60625
- Coordinates: 41.966259°N 87.688448°W
- Owner: Chicago Transit Authority
- Line: Ravenswood branch
- Platforms: 2 side platforms
- Tracks: 3

Construction
- Structure type: Elevated
- Cycle facilities: Yes
- Accessible: Yes

History
- Opened: May 18, 1907; 119 years ago
- Rebuilt: circa 1928; 98 years ago, 1979–1981; 45 years ago, 2024–26

Passengers
- 2025: 661,837 ▼0.5%

Services
Preceding station	Chicago "L"	Following station
Rockwell toward Kimball	Brown Line	Damen toward Loop (Washington/Wells)
Track layout
Location

Western is an 'L' station on the CTA's Brown Line. It is an elevated station with two side platforms, located in the Lincoln Square neighborhood. The adjacent stations are Rockwell, which is located about one-quarter mile (0.40 km) to the west, and Damen, about one-half mile (0.80 km) to the east. Between Western and Rockwell the line descends and runs on ground level tracks for the rest of the route to Kimball.

== History ==
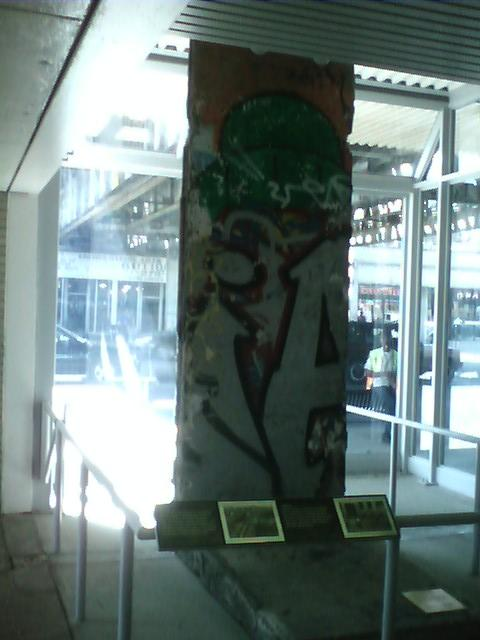
Berlin Wall Monument inside the station

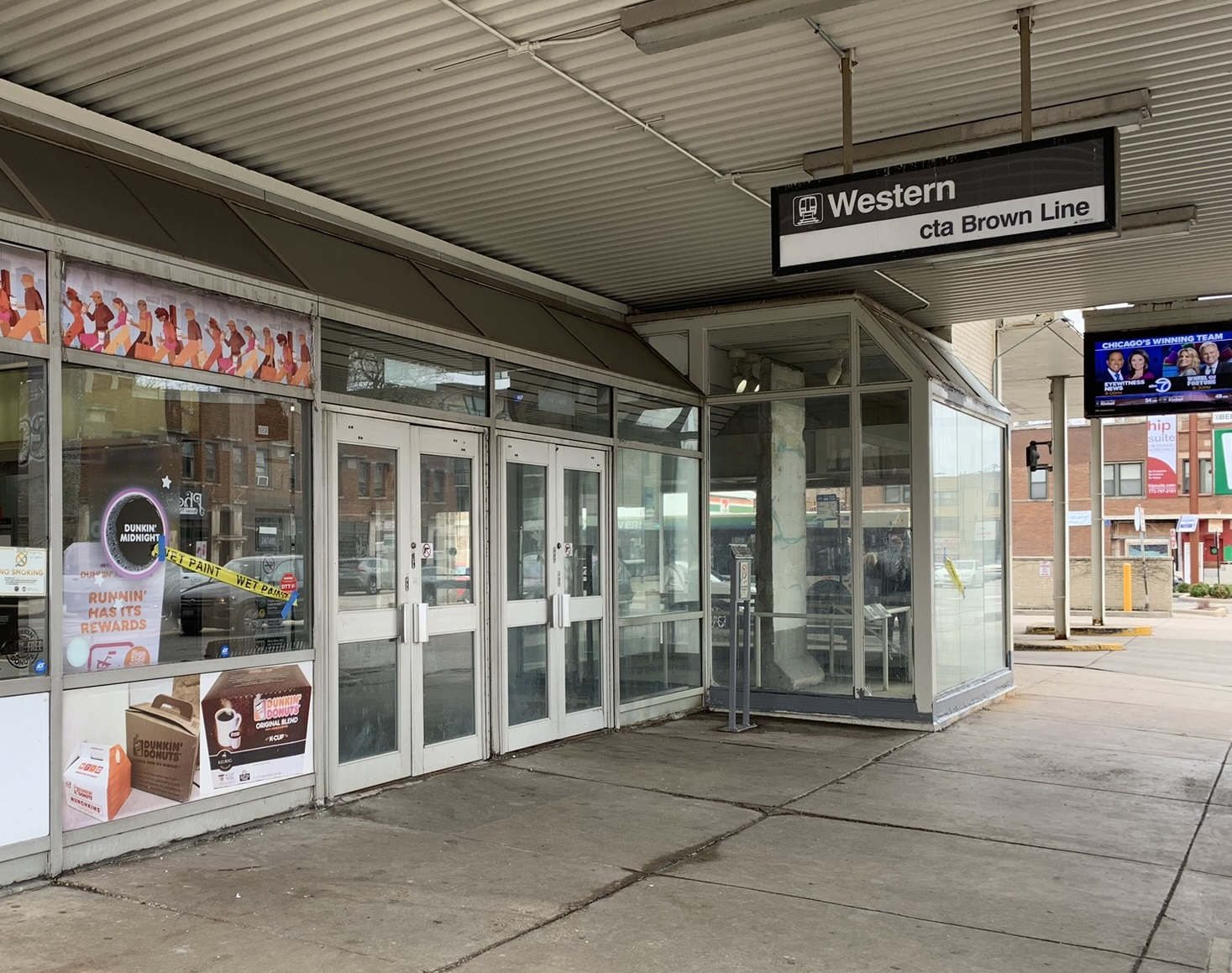
The Western station house in 2023

The station was put into service in 1907 as part of Northwestern Elevated Railroad's Ravenswood line, and has been rebuilt twice since—in the late 1920s, and again from 1979 to 1981. The current station consists of two side platforms, and a central storage track. Its platforms were extended in 2006–07 to enable the station to accommodate eight railcars as part of the Brown Line Capacity Expansion Project.

Chicago's Berlin Wall Monument is located inside of the station. Chicago was offered a piece of the wall in 2008 by the German government. The city chose to place the monument in the historically German-American Lincoln Square neighborhood. It is dedicated to the citizens of Chicago for helping "secure the freedom" of Berlin.

== Bus connections ==
CTA

- 11 Lincoln
- 49 Western (Owl Service)
- 49B North Western
- X49 Western Express (weekday rush hours only)
