= Montrose station (CTA Brown Line) =

Chicago "L" station

Montrose 4400N 1800W
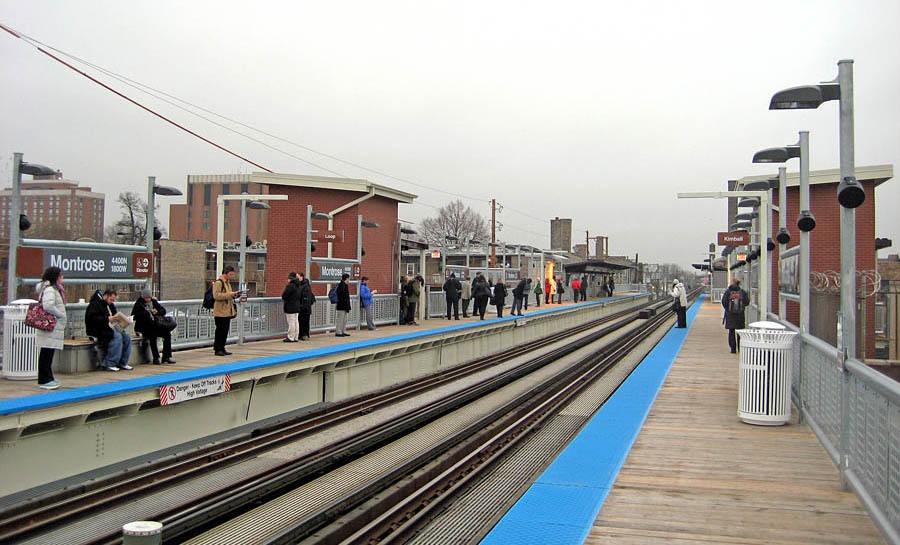

General information
- Location: 1817 West Montrose Avenue; Chicago, Illinois 60613
- Coordinates: 41.961650°N 87.675162°W
- Owner: Chicago Transit Authority
- Line: Ravenswood branch
- Platforms: 2 side platforms
- Tracks: 2

Construction
- Structure type: Elevated
- Cycle facilities: Yes
- Accessible: Yes

History
- Opened: May 18, 1907; 119 years ago
- Rebuilt: 2006–2007; 19 years ago

Passengers
- 2025: 466,150 ▲4.7%

Services
| Preceding station | Chicago "L" | Following station |
|---|---|---|
| Damen toward Kimball | Brown Line | Irving Park toward Loop (Washington/Wells) |
Former services
| Preceding station | Chicago "L" | Following station |
|---|---|---|
| Ravenswood Closed 1949 toward Kimball | Ravenswood branch | Irving Park toward Belmont |
Track layout
Location

Montrose is a station on the Chicago Transit Authority's 'L' system. It is situated between the Damen and Irving Park stations on the Brown Line, which runs between Albany Park on Chicago's Northwest Side and downtown Chicago. It is an elevated station with two side platforms located at 1817 West Montrose Avenue in the Ravenswood neighborhood of Chicago's Lincoln Square community area.

== Location ==
Montrose is situated on West Montrose Avenue, between its intersections with North Damen Avenue and North Ashland Avenue. The station is located in the Lincoln Square community area of Chicago; the area surrounding the station consists of a mixture commercial, residential and manufacturing areas.

== History ==
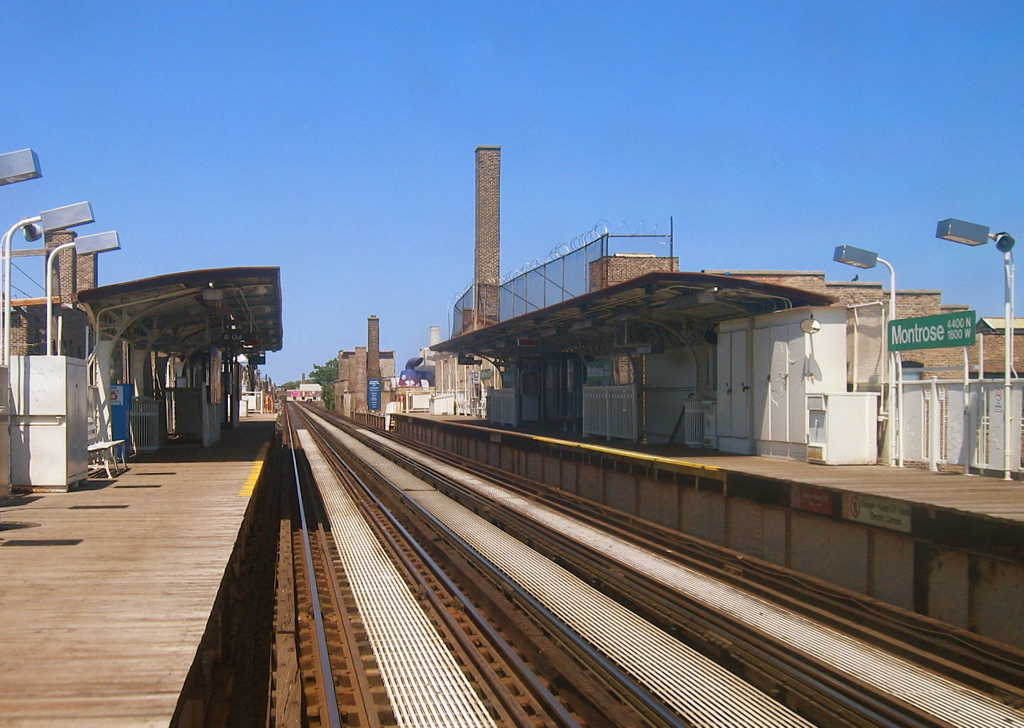
Montrose station in July 2006

Montrose station, and the corresponding Montrose Avenue, are both named after James Graham, 1st Marquess of Montrose, a Scottish nobleman.

Montrose Station opened in 1907 as part of the Northwestern Elevated Railroad's Ravenswood line. In CTA's skip-stop service on the Brown Line, instituted in 1949, Montrose was originally an "AB" station, but it was changed to "B" station in 1973, and remained that way until the CTA discontinued skip-stop service in 1995.

In 2006, the CTA began the Brown Line Capacity Expansion Project, which involved the renovation and reconstruction of all Brown Line stations to allow eight car trains to run on the line and to ensure that all stations are accessible to passengers with disabilities. Montrose station closed between December 2, 2006, and November 26, 2007, and was completely rebuilt.

== Service ==
Montrose is part of the CTA's Brown Line, which runs between Albany Park and downtown Chicago. It is the seventh inbound station and is situated between the Damen and Irving Park stations. Brown Line trains serve Montrose between 4:00 am and 1:30 am on weekdays and Saturdays, and between 6:30 am and 12:20 am on Sundays; trains operate roughly every 3 to 10 minutes during rush hour, with longer headways of up to 15 minutes at night. 880,862 passengers boarded at Montrose in 2014.

== Bus connections ==
CTA

- 78 Montrose
