= Francisco station =

Chicago "L" station

Francisco 2900W 4700N
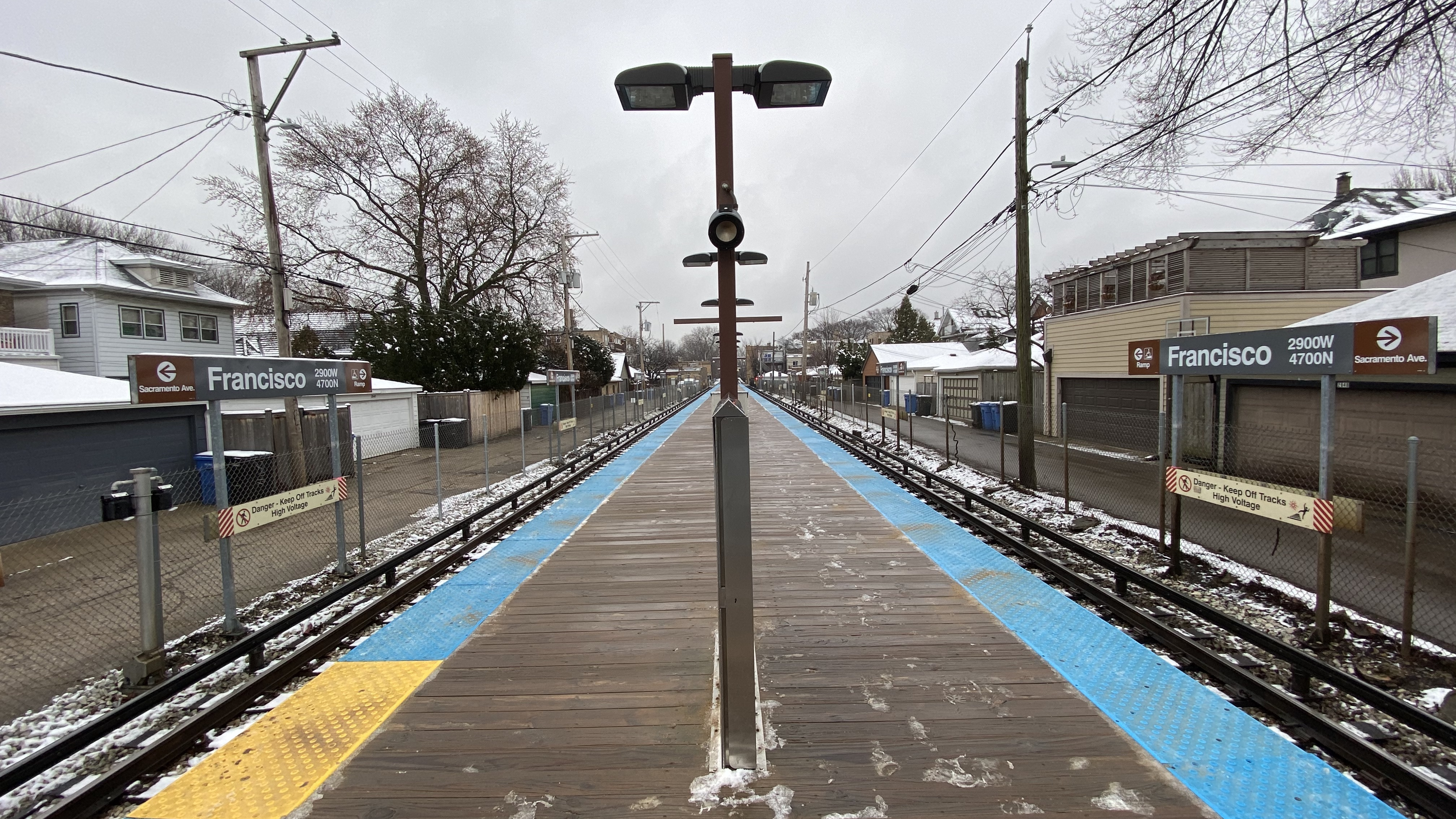

General information
- Location: 4649 North Francisco Avenue; Chicago, Illinois 60625
- Coordinates: 41.966155°N 87.702099°W
- Owner: Chicago Transit Authority
- Line: Ravenswood Branch
- Platforms: 1 island platform
- Tracks: 2

Construction
- Structure type: At-grade
- Accessible: yes

History
- Opened: December 14, 1907; 118 years ago
- Rebuilt: 2006–2007; 19 years ago

Passengers
- 2025: 300,153 ▲4.5%

Services
Preceding station	Chicago "L"	Following station
Kedzie toward Kimball	Brown Line	Rockwell toward Loop (Washington/Wells)
Track layout
Location

Francisco is an 'L' station on the CTA's Brown Line. It is an at-grade station with a single island platform, located in Chicago's Ravenswood Manor neighborhood at 4649 North Francisco Avenue. The adjacent stations are Kedzie, which is about 0.3 miles (480 m) to the west, and Rockwell, located across the Chicago River about 0.4 miles (640 m) to the east.

== History ==
Francisco Station opened on December 14, 1907, as part of Northwestern Elevated Railroad's Ravenswood line. It had survived relatively intact until September 2006, when the station closed for renovation.

=== Brown Line Capacity Expansion Project ===
The Brown Line Capacity Expansion Project upgraded all Brown Line stations to be accessible to passengers with disabilities and extended platforms to allow eight car trains. Because of the historic nature of the station structures, Francisco Station was not completely rebuilt, as with the neighboring Kedzie and Rockwell stations. However, the platforms were rebuilt, an auxiliary entrance added on Sacramento Avenue, and the station house and canopy were renovated and upgraded. The station closed from September 15, 2006, to March 9, 2007, to allow this work to be completed.

Following the station's renovation, a mosaic was installed along the ramp leading to the station house. The mosaic, titled Commuter Carpet, was created by British conceptual artist Ellen Harvey whose work also appears in the New York City Subway and Boston's South Station. In June 2025, the mosaic was removed by the CTA after more than a decade of weather damage, which caused a slipping hazard for passengers.

== Gallery ==
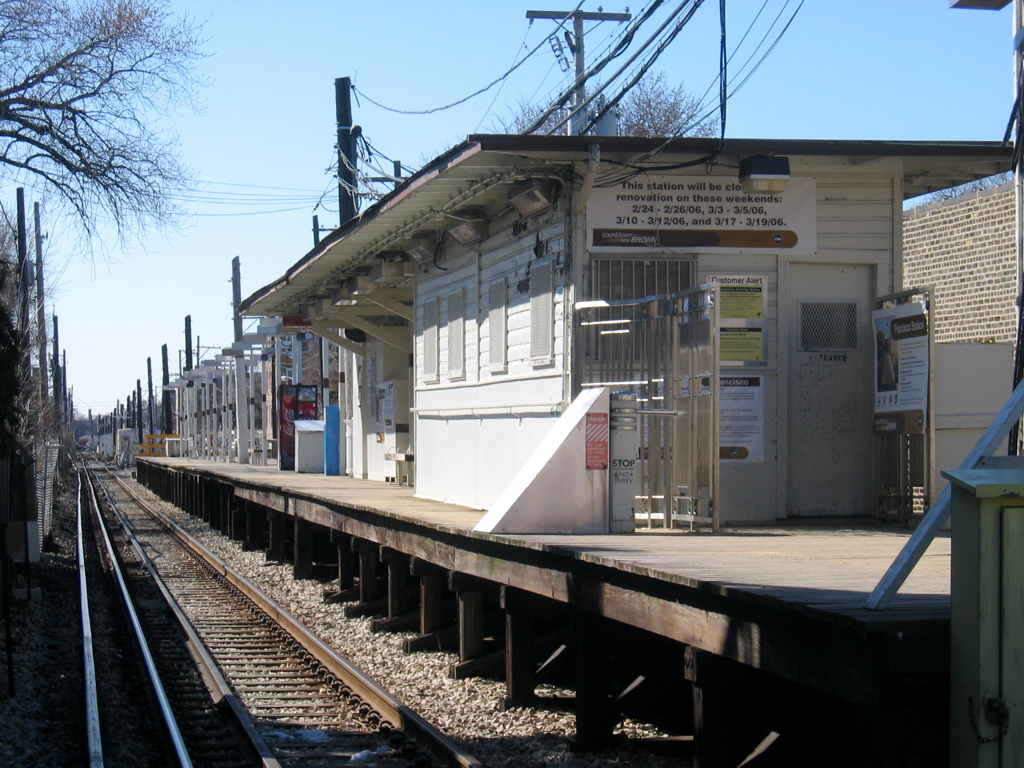
Francisco station in March 2006, prior to renovation

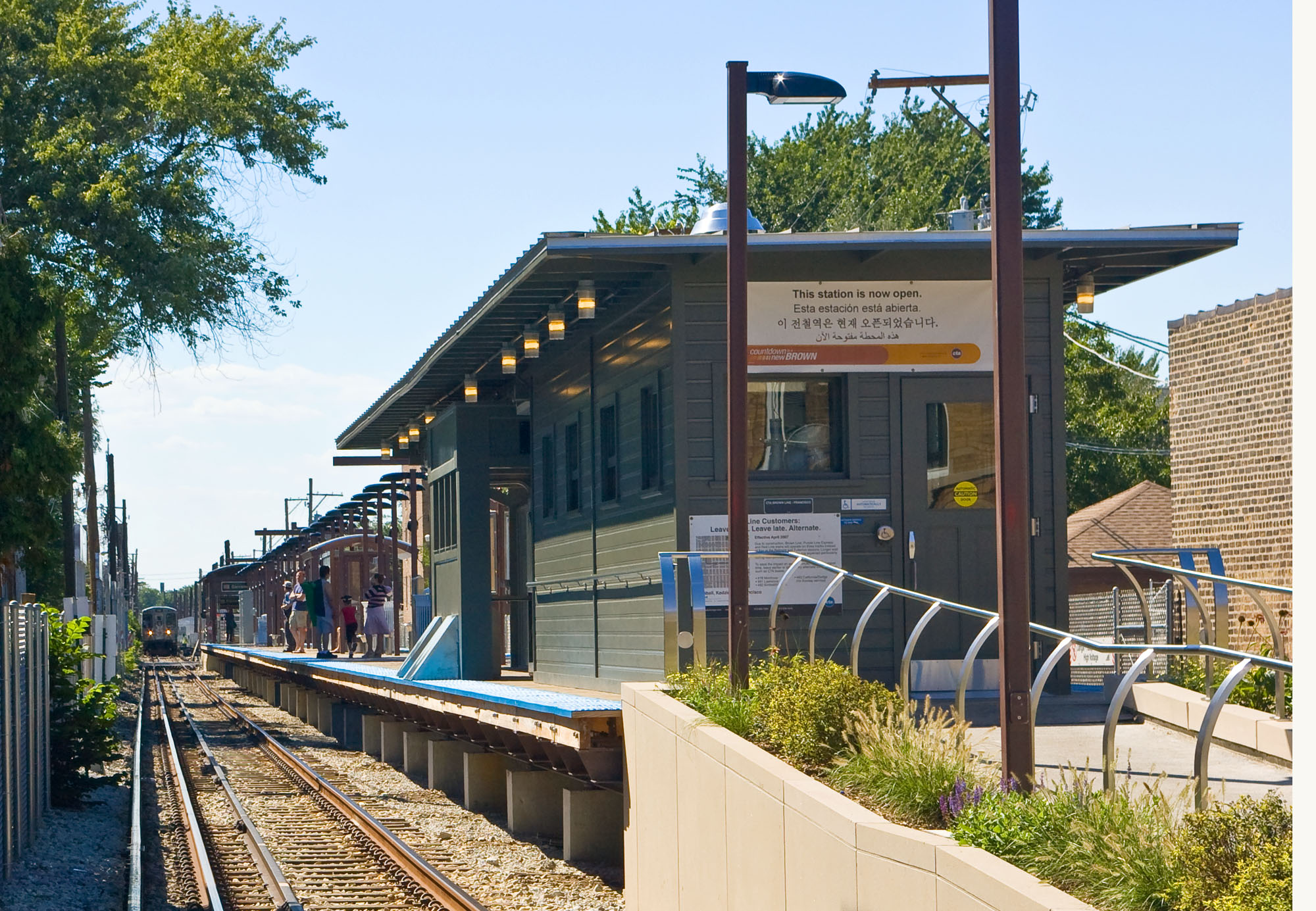
Newly rebuilt Francisco station, August 2007

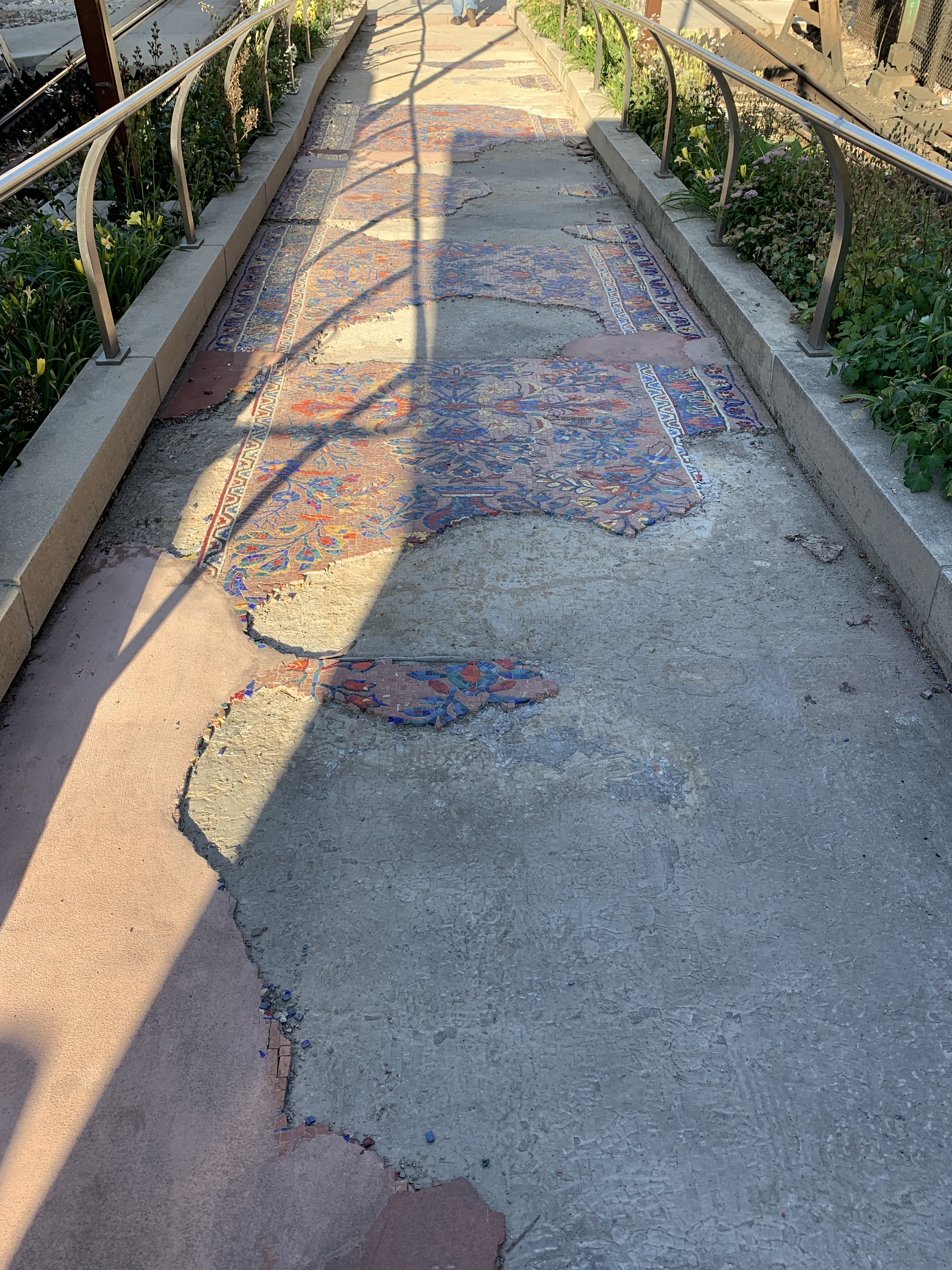
Commuter Carpet by Ellen Harvey during removal by the CTA in 2025
