= Rockwell station =

Chicago "L" station

Rockwell 2600W 4700N
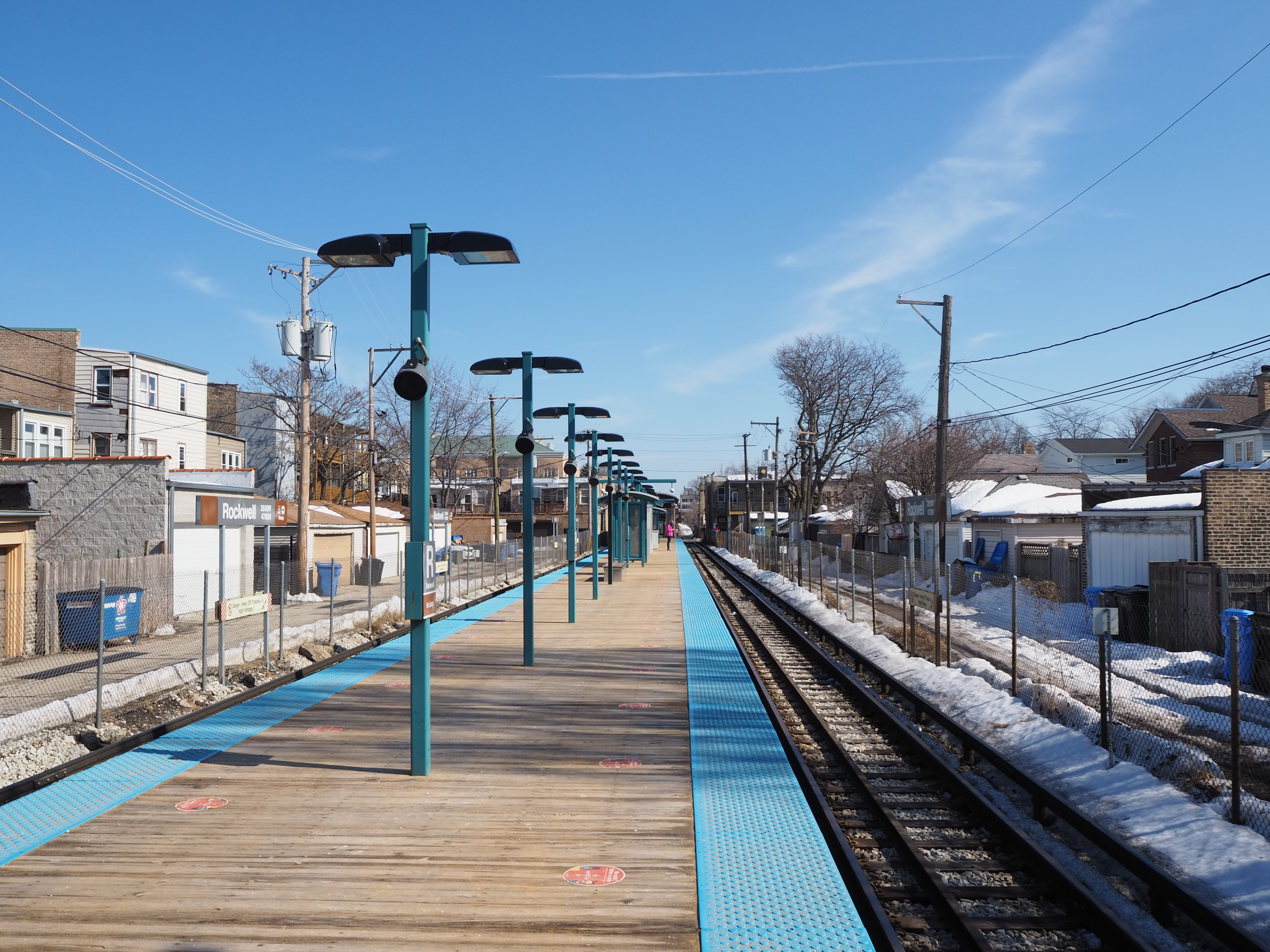

General information
- Location: 4648 North Rockwell Street; Chicago, Illinois 60625
- Coordinates: 41.966208°N 87.694720°W
- Owner: Chicago Transit Authority
- Line: Ravenswood Branch
- Platforms: 1 island platform
- Tracks: 2

Construction
- Structure type: At-grade
- Accessible: yes

History
- Opened: December 14, 1907; 118 years ago
- Rebuilt: 2006; 20 years ago

Passengers
- 2025: 324,660 ▲5.8%

Services
Preceding station	Chicago "L"	Following station
Francisco toward Kimball	Brown Line	Western toward Loop (Washington/Wells)
Track layout
Location

Rockwell is an 'L' station on the CTA's Brown Line. It is an at-grade station with a single island platform, located in Chicago's Lincoln Square neighborhood. The adjacent stations are Francisco, which is located across the Chicago River about 0.4 miles (640 m) to the west, and Western, located about 0.25 miles (400 m) to the east. Rockwell is the last station on the surface section of the Brown Line; between Rockwell and Western the line ascends and runs on elevated tracks for the rest of the route.

== Location ==
Rockwell is a surface level station with a single entrance/exit situated at 4648 North Rockwell Street between Leland Avenue and Eastwood Avenue in the Lincoln Square neighborhood of Chicago. The area surrounding the station consists of mostly residential single family homes or two-flats, with a small neighborhood shopping district flanking the station entrance on Rockwell Street.

== History ==
Rockwell opened December 14, 1907 as part of Northwestern Elevated Railroad's Ravenswood branch. The design of the original station house and platform canopy were similar to those that still exist at the neighboring Francisco Station. As part of the CTA's Brown Line Capacity Expansion Project, the station closed on February 20, 2006, demolished and rebuilt. The new Rockwell station, now accessible to passengers with disabilities, opened on August 16, 2006.
