= Ravenswood station (CTA) =

Former station on the Chicago "L"

RAVENSWOOD 4600N 1800W

General information
- Location: 4530 North Ravenswood Avenue; Chicago, Illinois
- Coordinates: 41.9652°N 87.6753°W
- Owner: Chicago Transit Authority
- Line: Ravenswood Line
- Platforms: 2 side platforms
- Tracks: 2 tracks
- Connections: Milwaukee Division (at Ravenswood–Wilson)

Construction
- Structure type: Elevated

History
- Opened: May 8, 1907; 119 years ago
- Closed: August 1, 1949; 77 years ago

Passengers
- 1948: 266,162 ▼17.77% (CTA)

Former services
Preceding station	Chicago "L"	Following station
Damen toward Kimball	Ravenswood branch	Montrose toward Belmont
Location

Ravenswood was a rapid transit station on the Chicago "L"'s Ravenswood branch, which is now part of the Brown Line. The station opened on May 18, 1907, and was located at Wilson Avenue and Ravenswood Avenue in the Ravenswood neighborhood of Chicago. It was built to serve as a connection point to the Chicago and North Western Railway via their adjacent Ravenswood–Wilson station. Ravenswood was situated east of Damen and north of Montrose. The station closed on August 1, 1949, along with 22 other stations as part of a CTA service revision. It is the only station on the Ravenswood branch to be closed.

== Station details ==
=== Ridership ===
Station ridership peaked in 1917 at 547,257 passengers. Between 1923 and its closure, Ravenswood was consistently the least-patronized station on the Ravenswood branch. Ridership last exceeded 500,000 passengers in 1928 and 400,000 in 1930. In its last full year of operation, 1948, it served 266,162 riders, a 17.77 percent decline from the 323,689 passengers of 1947. For the part of 1949 it was open, it served 137,193 patrons.

== Works cited ==
- CTA Rail Entrance, Annual Traffic, 1900–1979 (Report). Chicago: Chicago Transit Authority. October 1, 1979.
