= Berlin Wall Monument (Chicago) =

Berlin Wall segment in Chicago, U.S.

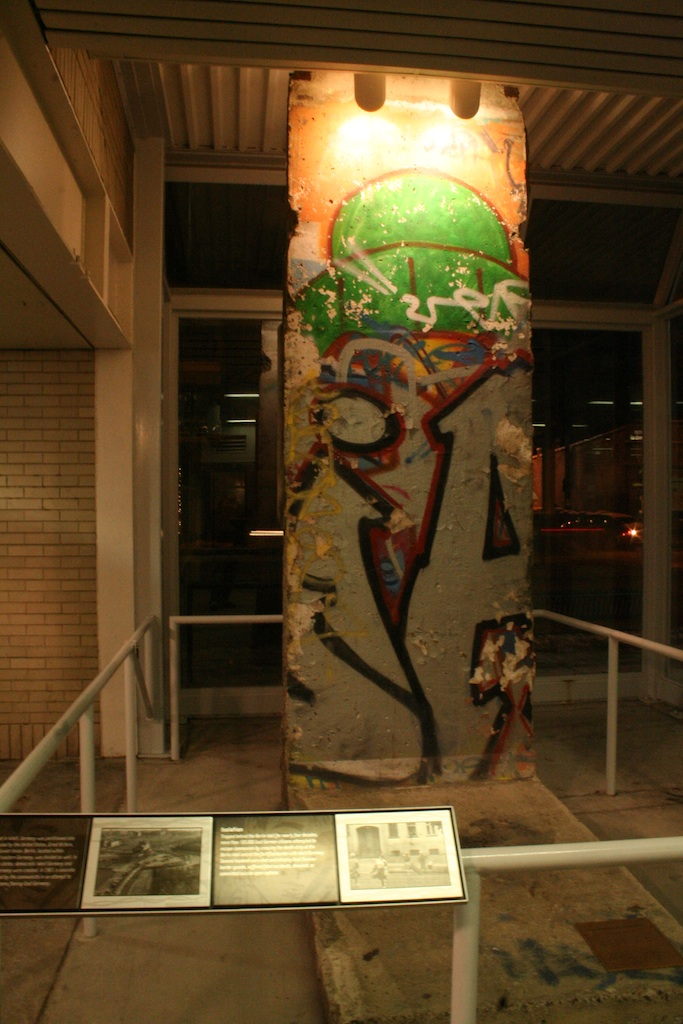
- The Berlin Wall Monument in Chicago, exhibiting the side originally facing West Germany
- Interactive map of Berlin Wall Monument
- Location: Western station, Lincoln Square, Chicago
- Coordinates: 41.966165°N 87.688513°W
- Type: Wall fragment
- Material: Concrete
- Opening date: 2008

The Berlin Wall Monument in Chicago is an exhibit on display at the Western Brown Line CTA station. Located in the Lincoln Square, Chicago neighborhood, an historically German-American enclave, the monument contains a large segment of the Berlin Wall and a plaque describing its dedication to the city. The Berlin Wall represented one of the great political, economic, and ideological divides of the twentieth century between two major powers: the United States and the Soviet Union.

== Background ==
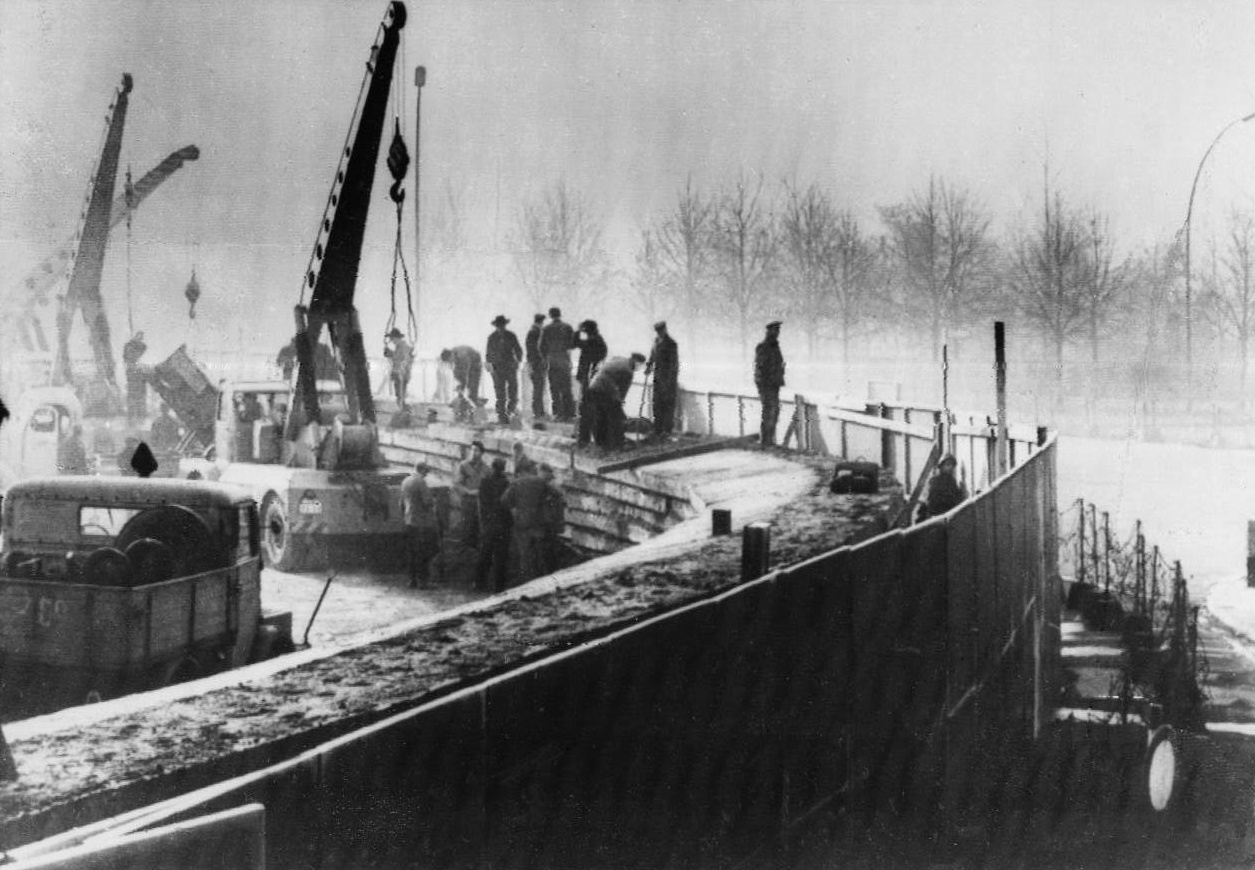
This image is of the construction of the Berlin Wall. The wall existed from 1962 to 1989. After its demolition, pieces of the wall were broken with some taken as souvenirs.

World War II affected many countries, Germany in particular. After the years of total war, the Nazi regime in Germany finally surrendered to the Allied countries in spring of 1945. Later, the Empire of Japan surrendered shortly after the second atomic bomb devastated their country. In the post-war years, tensions between two of the victorious powers, the United States and the Soviet Union emerged. The former was growing ever more capitalistic and the latter pursued communism. Germany, not only geographically located in the center of Europe, was the center of the divide between the powers. Germany, as well as its capital, Berlin, were partitioned by the victors of the Second World War; there were multiple sectors, but the major division was East-West, dividing the areas supported by the capitalist countries from those by the communist one.

A great wall was erected almost two decades later to strengthen the division, literally and figuratively. Built in 1961, the Berlin Wall represented one of the great political, economic, and ideological divides of the twentieth century between two major powers: the United States and the Soviet Union. It was 96 miles in length. The conflict between these two powers affected the global community, particularly in Germany. Even after it was demolished, the wall symbolized divisions in Germany and the rest of the world, ones that arguably still exist today. Cornell sociologist Christine Leuenberger described the effects of the wall and its ultimate fall by arguing that "It became the landmark that symbolized the Cold War… the Berlin Wall also left a lasting impression on the psyche of the German people". She further argues that The Berlin Wall "provides a salient and powerful example of how material culture intersects with knowledge production in the psychological sciences".

== After the fall ==
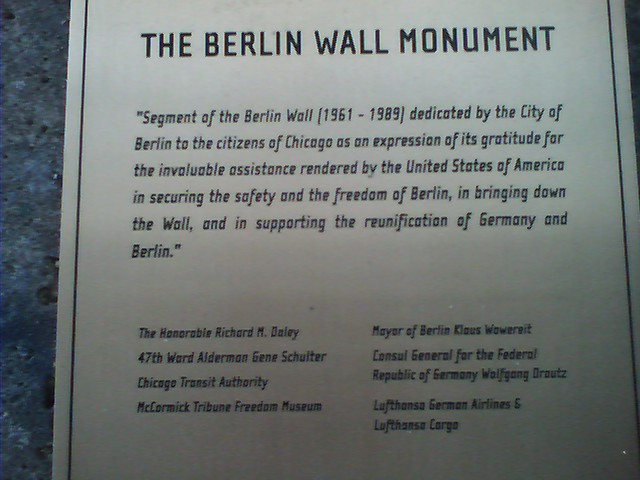
Monument plaque describing the dedication to Chicago.

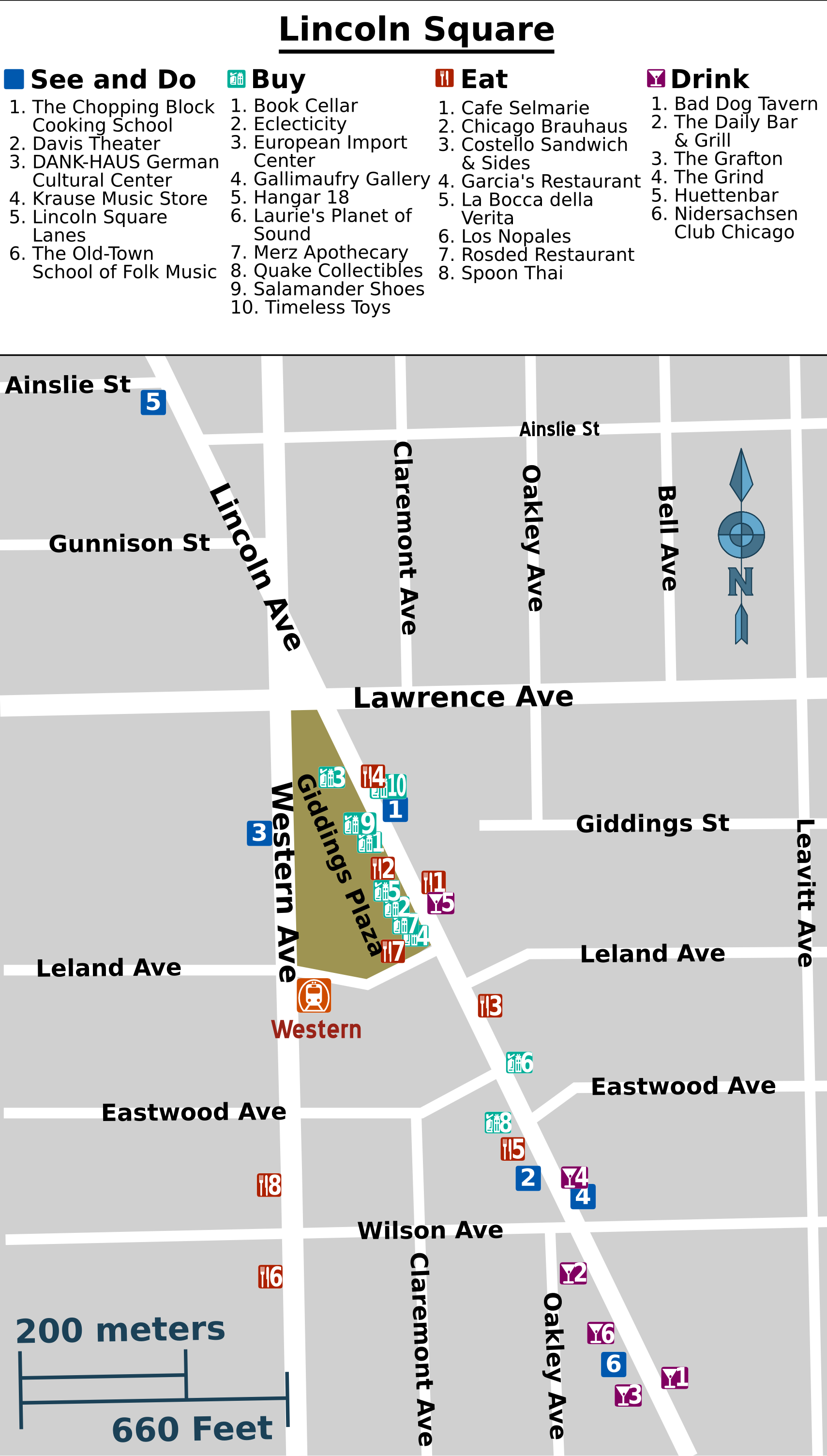
This is a tourism map of Lincoln Square. Lincoln Square is a neighborhood in the northern part of Chicago. It has been a historically German neighborhood.

Since the fall of the Berlin Wall on November 9, 1989, fragments of the Berlin Wall have been donated to various cities in the world. Chicago was offered a piece of the wall in 2008 by the German government and was placed in the Lincoln Square neighborhood due to its German roots. It is on permanent display at the Western Brown Line Station. Lincoln Square is just southwest of Ravenswood in the northern part of Chicago.

The particular segment of the wall donated came from the fourth phase of the Berlin Wall's construction, called Grenzmauer 75.

The dedication was attended by 120 residents and included several prominent individuals such as Erich Himmel of United German American Societies of Greater Chicago, Alderman Gene Schulter, Chicago Transit Authority President Ron Huberman, then-mayor of Chicago Richard M. Daley and the U.S. diplomat and chargé d'affaires to Germany, James D. Bindenagel. It is one of three fragments of the wall on display in Illinois; the second is in the Ronald Reagan Peace Garden at Eureka College in Eureka, Illinois and the third is in the First Division Museum in Wheaton, Illinois.

== Description ==
The wall segment is visible on both sides. The side that originally faced West Germany contains sprayed graffiti and messages from the time the wall was standing. The side that faced East Germany, on the other hand, is entirely blank because it was placed under heavy security during its use. The piece thus serves as a metaphoric and literal reminder of the two very different sides of a long, bitter conflict.

The monument also contains a plaque describing the dedication and reasoning behind why the wall fragment was donated. The inscription reads:

Segment of the Berlin Wall (1961–1989) dedicated by the City of Berlin to the citizens of Chicago as an expression of its gratitude for the invaluable assistance rendered by the United States of America in securing the safety and freedom of Berlin, in bringing down the Wall, and in supporting reunification of Germany and Berlin.

The inscription contains affirmations of acceptance from many representative individuals and businesses of both Chicago and Germany at the time including Chicago Mayor Richard M. Daley, Mayor of Berlin Klaus Wowereit, German Consul General Wolfgang Droutz, Lufthansa, and the Chicago Transit Authority.
