= Brown Line (CTA) =

Chicago "L" rapid transit line

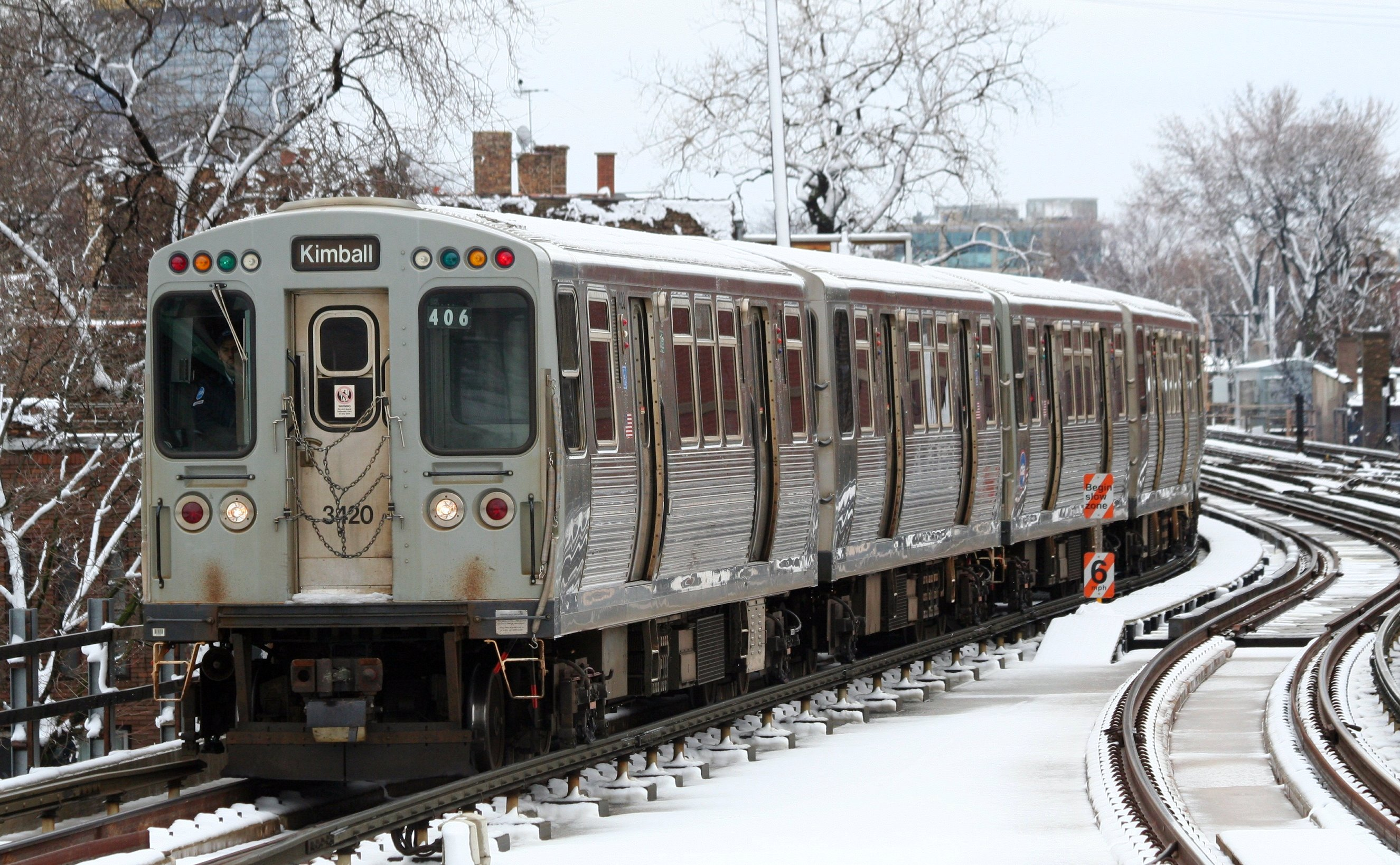
- A Brown Line train of 3200-series cars

Overview
- Status: Operating
- Locale: Chicago, Illinois, United States
- Termini: Kimball; The Loop
- Stations: 27

Service
- Type: Rapid transit
- System: Chicago "L"
- Operator: Chicago Transit Authority
- Depot: Kimball Yard
- Rolling stock: Mixed 2600-series and 3200-series 8-car trains (typical, maximum)
- Daily ridership: 35,176 (avg. weekday in 2024)

History
- Opened: August 1, 1949 (current operation)

Technical
- Num of tracks: 2
- Character: Elevated and at-grade
- Track gauge: 4 ft 8 1/2 in (1,435 mm) standard gauge
- Minimum radius: 90 feet (27 m)
- Electrification: Third rail, 600 V DC
- Operating speed: 40 mph (64 km/h)
Route map
Brown Line highlighted in brown
- Bus connections at all open stations except Kedzie, Francisco, Rockwell, Southport, and Wellington.

The Brown Line of the Chicago "L" system, is an 11.4-mile (18.3 km) route with 27 stations between Chicago's Albany Park neighborhood and downtown Chicago. It runs completely above ground and is almost entirely grade-separated. It is the third-busiest 'L' route, with an average of 35,176 passengers boarding each weekday in 2024.

Before CTA lines were color-coded in 1993, the Brown Line was known as the Ravenswood Route; specifically, the section that runs from Belmont to Kimball is called the Ravenswood branch. Accordingly, the Kimball-Belmont shuttle service was called the Ravenswood Shuttle.

== Route ==
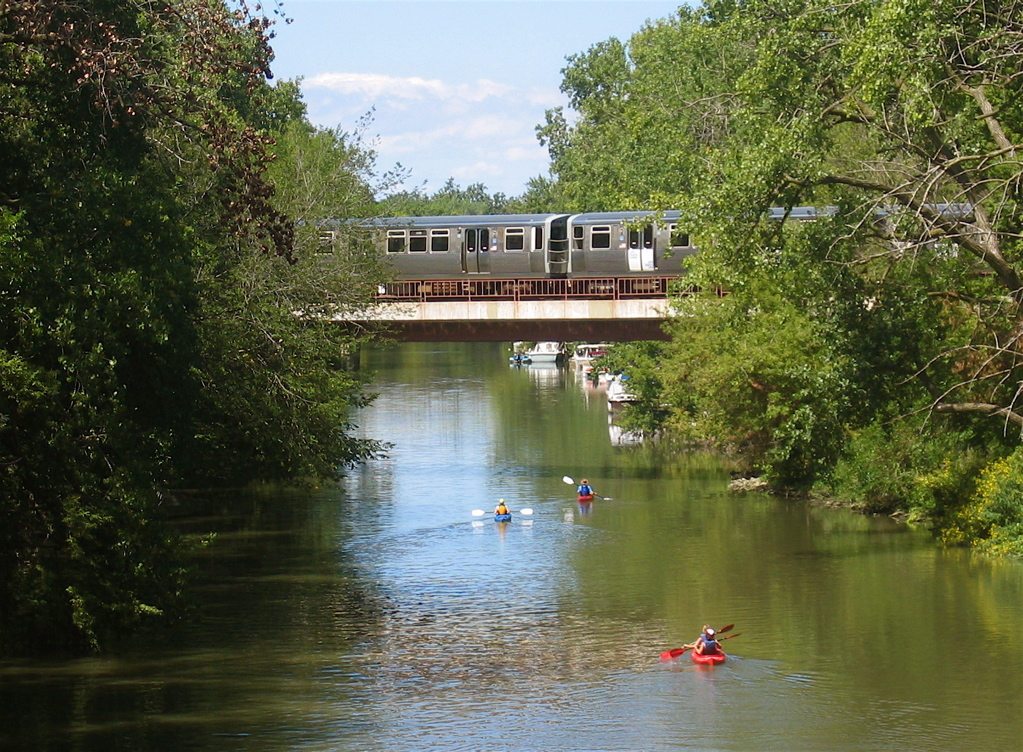
A Brown Line train crosses the north branch of the Chicago River.

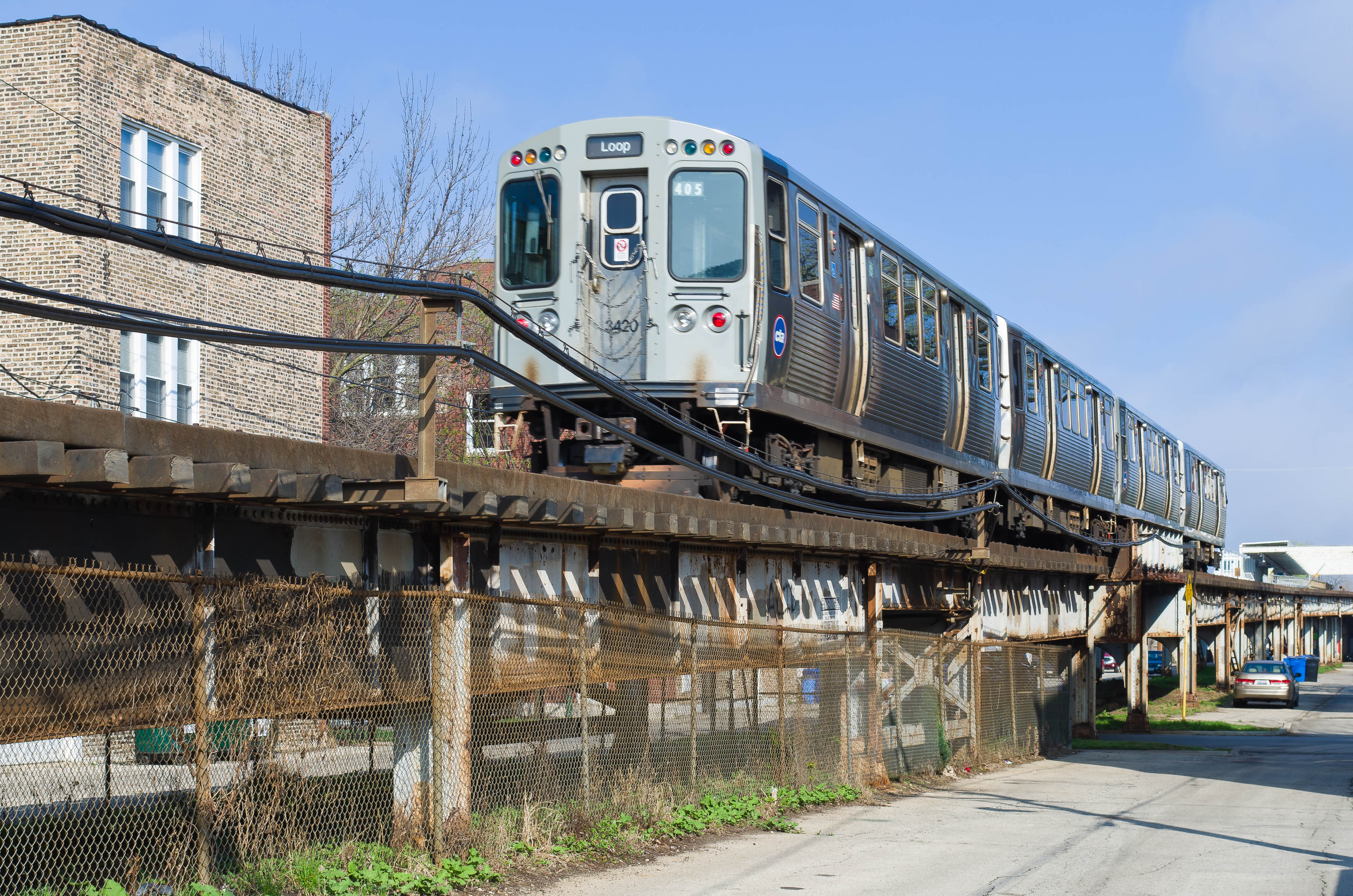
Between Rockwell and Western stations a ramp carries Brown Line trains from ground-level to elevated tracks.

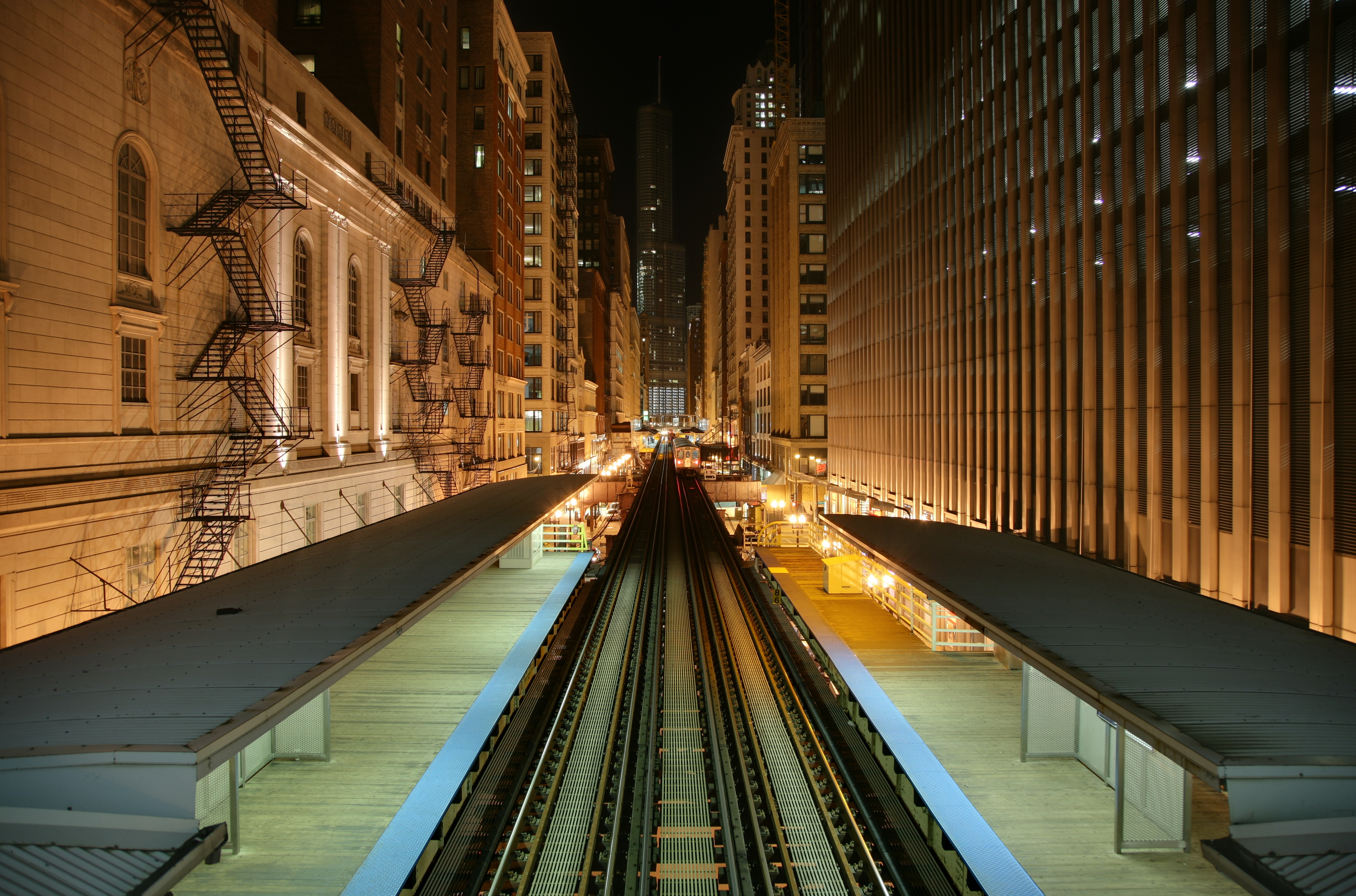
Northward view from Adams/Wabash station

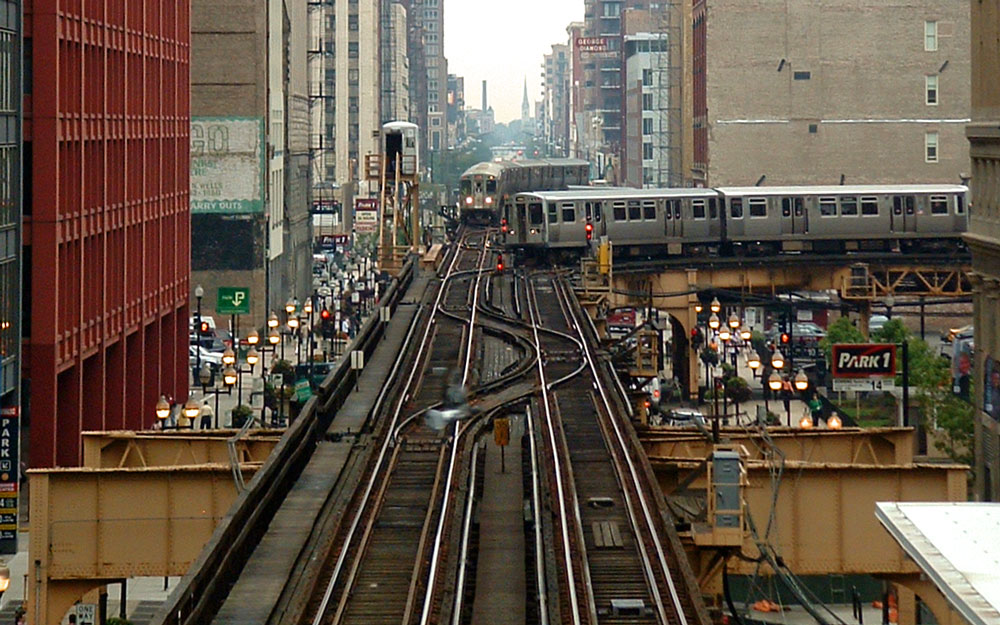
Brown and Orange line trains contend for the junction at the southeast corner of the Chicago Loop. Photographed from the Adams/Wabash crossover walkway on the Green, Orange, Brown and Purple lines.

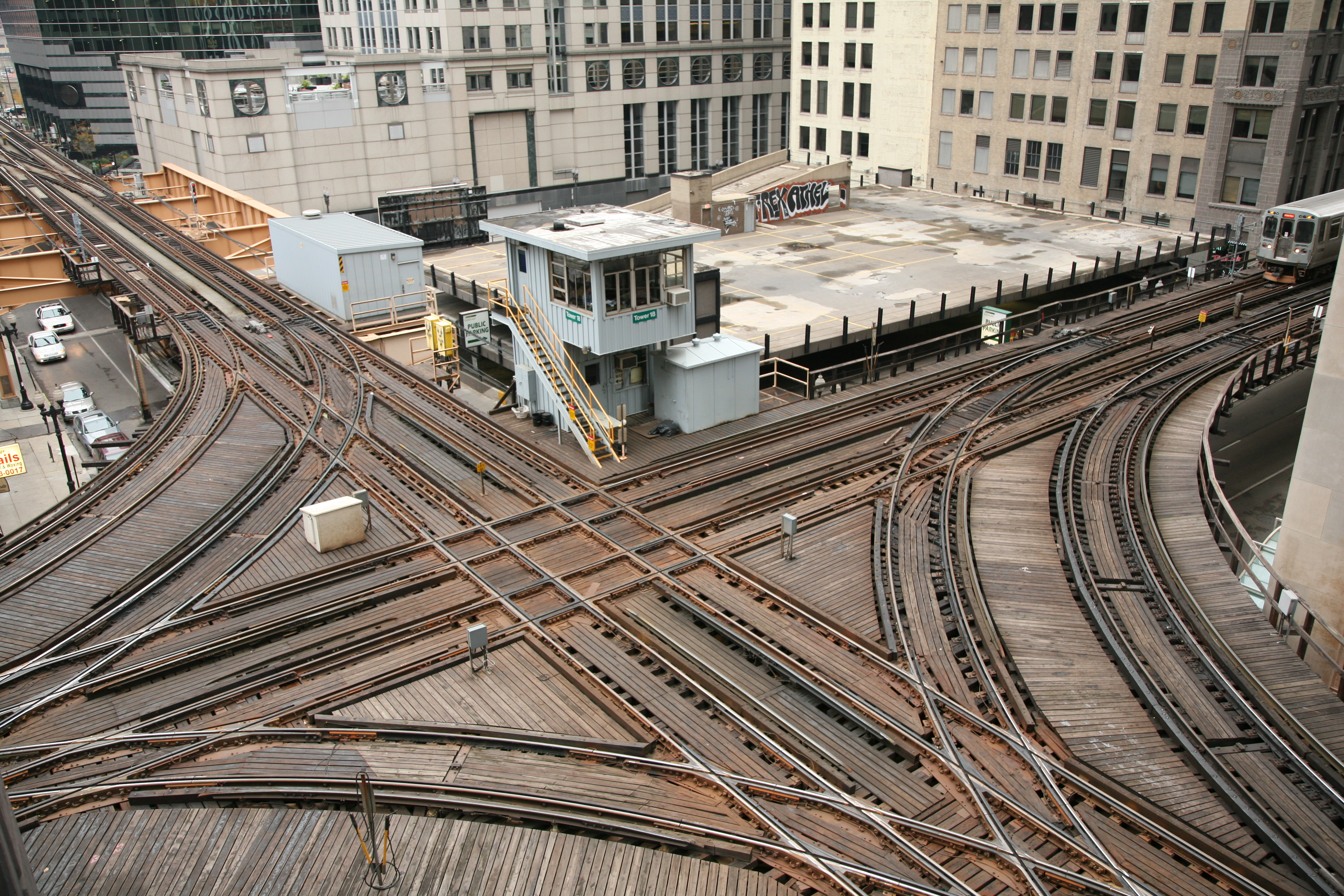
CTA Control Tower 18 guides Chicago 'L' trains through an elevated junction where the north- and southbound Purple and Brown Lines, east- and westbound Pink and Green Lines, and Orange Line pass though. The tower is at the northwest corner of the Loop, at the intersection of Wells and Lake Streets.

The Brown Line begins on the northwest side of Chicago, at the Kimball terminal in Albany Park, where there is a storage yard and servicing shop for the trains to the east of the passenger station. From there, Loop-bound Brown Line trains operate eastward over street-level tracks, running between and parallel to Leland and Eastwood Avenues to Rockwell, then ramp up to an elevated structure for the rest of the trip.

While running on the street-level section, the trains are powered by third rail rather than overhead catenary (the technology used by most other U.S. electric-powered at-grade rail systems), a decision that exposes wayward pedestrians to the risk of electrocution. A fatal accident occurred in 1977 when an intoxicated man, who did not speak English and was unable to read the posted warning signage, died while attempting to urinate on the third rail at the Kedzie station. The accident eventually resulted in a 1992 Illinois Supreme Court decision affirming a verdict of $1.5 million against CTA.

After the Damen station, the route turns south, running parallel to and just west of Ravenswood Avenue and Metra's Union Pacific North railroad line, to a point south of Addison station. From there, the route again turns east and runs parallel to Roscoe Street. At Sheffield Avenue near Clark Street, it once again turns southward to join the four-track North Side elevated line in Lakeview. From just north of Belmont station southward to Armitage, Brown and Red Line trains operate side by side, with Purple Line Express trains sharing tracks with the Brown Line trains during weekday rush hours. In this area, the trains of both Brown and Purple Lines run on the outermost tracks, serving five stops, while Red Line trains run on the innermost tracks, making only two stops.

From the Armitage station, Brown and Purple Line trains continue southward toward the Loop on elevated tracks, zigzagging through the neighborhoods of Lincoln Park and Near North Side, stopping at Sedgwick and Chicago. Running over Franklin Street, then Wells Street, the trains of both lines stop at Merchandise Mart, then cross the Chicago River on the upper level of the Wells Street Bridge before joining the Loop Elevated at Lake Street. Within the Loop, Brown Line trains travel in a counter-clockwise direction on the outer track — along Wells Street, then Van Buren Street, Wabash Avenue and Lake Street — serving all elevated Loop stations. They then leave the Loop, turning northward to make the return trip back to Kimball terminal. The Brown Line is the only route that makes a full circuit around the Loop counter-clockwise. Within the Loop, only Green Line trains bound for Harlem/Lake share tracks with Brown Line trains, on the Loop's north and east segments.

There are three sections of the Brown Line. There is the Ravenswood Branch, linking Kimball station with Belmont, a station also served by the Red Line and Purple Line Express. Another is the North Side Main Line, which extends from Belmont station to Merchandise Mart station, the last stop before the Loop. Within the Loop, Brown Line trains travel counter-clockwise, stopping at Washington/Wells, then Quincy, with the final stop at Clark/Lake, before heading back toward Kimball station.

== Operating hours and headways ==
The Brown Line operates between Kimball and the Loop weekdays and Saturdays from 4 a.m. to 2:10 a.m. and on Sundays from 5 a.m. to 1:40 a.m. On weekdays, service runs every three to eight minutes during rush hour, every seven to eight minutes during midday, then every six to twelve minutes during nighttime.

On weekends, early-morning service operates every fifteen minutes, increasing in frequency during the day to every seven to eight minutes on Saturdays, every ten minutes on Sundays and holidays. Weekend service at nighttime is every ten to twelve minutes, with late-night service operating every fifteen minutes until the end of service.

During the morning rush hour, several Loop-bound Orange Line trains, upon reaching Roosevelt station, continue on as Brown Line trains, bound for Kimball. Upon reaching Kimball, they then make the return trip toward the Loop as Brown Line trains until arriving at Harold Washington Library station, where they again transform back to Orange Line trains, bound for Midway. This borrowing of Orange Line rolling stock helps supplement service on the Brown Line, which is hindered by the limited capacity of the Kimball Yard. While this service does not have an official name, the CTA internally refers to the trains as tiger trains (due to the two lines' colors resembling those of a tiger).

== Rolling stock ==
The Brown Line operates with 2600-series and 3200-series railcars, using eight-car trains during weekday rush hours and four-car trains at other times. CTA has completed the process of overhauling the 3200-series cars with color LED destination signs (similar to the 5000-series cars), new air-conditioning systems, as well as rebuilt propulsion systems, passenger-door motors, and wheel/axle assemblies. The 3200-series rehabilitation began in 2015 and was completed in 2018. Later that year, some of the Brown Line's 3200-series cars were transferred to the Blue Line, with some of the Orange Line's 2600-series cars being transferred to the Brown Line.

Beginning in March 2008, the Brown Line began running trains of eight cars during rush hours, since all of the reopened or renovated stations have been rebuilt to accommodate eight cars. (Prior to 2008, most stations on the line couldn't berth more than six cars.) Eight cars has since become standard for all Brown Line trains.

== History ==
The Northwestern Elevated Railroad opened the line, originally known as the Ravenswood line, between the existing main line and Western Avenue in Lincoln Square on May 18, 1907. The route was completed to the Kimball terminal on December 14, 1907.

The Kimball terminal was completely renovated and a new bridge over the North Branch of the Chicago River was completed in the 1970s. The Western and Merchandise Mart stations were rebuilt in the 1980s. Prior to the start of the Brown Line Capacity Expansion Project, these two stations, along with the Kimball terminal were the only ADA-accessible stations on the Brown Line outside of the Loop.

=== Brown Line Capacity Expansion Project ===
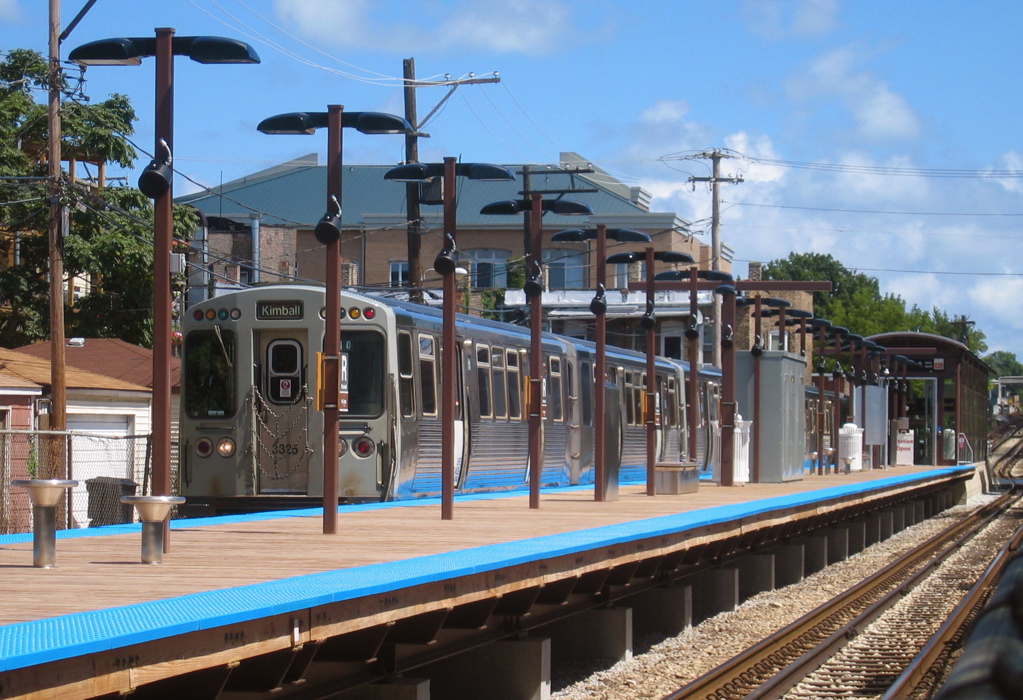
The new Rockwell Station opened in August 2006.

The Brown Line Capacity Expansion Project, which ran from 2004 to 2009, was undertaken to repair aging infrastructure and increase passenger capacity. Work on the project began in late 2004 with signal upgrades, particularly at Clark Junction, where the Brown Line merges with the Red and Purple Lines. In February 2006, station reconstruction began with right-of-way modernization between Kimball Avenue and Rockwell Street. Traction power equipment and train control systems were upgraded, and a new fiber optic communication network was installed.

Brown Line stations were rebuilt or modified to be ADA compliant and accommodate eight-car trains, an increase from the previous maximum of six. Merchandise Mart was the only station not to receive any work — it had previously been reconstructed from 1987 to 1988, and was already ADA compliant and able to accommodate eight-car trains. Two stations, Kimball and Western, received short extensions to their platforms but little other work, and the other 16 stations were completely rebuilt.

The first two stations to be completed, Kedzie and Rockwell, reopened on August 16, 2006, and all Brown Line stations had reopened by July 30, 2009, when the newly reconstructed Wellington station re-entered service. The project was completed on December 31, 2009.

=== Red-Purple Bypass ===
A flyover ramp was built to carry outbound Brown Line trains across the main line without obstructing other trains.

As part of the Red & Purple Modernization Project, a flyover track was built at Clark Junction, just north of Belmont station, allowing outbound Brown Line trains to access the Ravenswood branch without having to cross onto tracks used by the Red and Purple Line trains. Since the project's completion, train congestion on the lines has decreased and service capacity has increased. The plan was criticized by 2015 mayoral candidate Chuy García and local residents in the Lakeview neighborhood who organized a referendum to stop it.

The Federal Transit Administration passed the CTA's environmental review on the bypass in January 2016, and CTA received a $1.1 billion federal grant the following year. Sixteen properties affected by the bypass were demolished, while the historic Vautravers Building was relocated about 30 feet (9.1 m) to the west, preserving it while allowing the tracks of the Red and Purple lines to be straightened. Construction on the bypass began on October 2, 2019, and the bypass was opened to its first train at 4 a.m. on November 19, 2021.

== Station listing ==
Neighborhood	Station	Connections
Albany Park	Kimball	CTA buses: 81 82
Albany Park	Kedzie	CTA bus: 93
Albany Park	Francisco	
Lincoln Square	Rockwell	
Lincoln Square	Western	CTA buses: 11 49 49B X49
Lincoln Square	Damen	Metra: Union Pacific North (at Ravenswood); CTA buses: 50 81
Lincoln Square	Ravenswood	Closed August 1, 1949; demolished
Lincoln Square/ North Center	Montrose	CTA bus: 78
North Center	Irving Park	CTA bus: 80
North Center	Addison	CTA bus: 152
Lake View	Paulina	CTA buses: 9 X9
Lake View	Southport	
Lake View	Belmont	Chicago "L": Red Purple; CTA buses: 22 77
Lake View	Wellington	
Lincoln Park	Diversey	CTA bus: 76
Lincoln Park	Wrightwood	Closed August 1, 1949; demolished
Lincoln Park	Fullerton	Chicago "L": Red Purple; CTA buses: 37 74
Lincoln Park	Webster	Closed August 1, 1949; demolished
Lincoln Park	Armitage	CTA bus: 73
Lincoln Park	Willow	Closed May 17, 1942; demolished
Lincoln Park	Halsted	Closed August 1, 1949; demolished
Near North; Side	Larrabee	Closed August 1, 1949; demolished
Near North; Side	Sedgwick	CTA buses: N9 37 72
Near North; Side	Schiller	Closed August 1, 1949; demolished
Near North; Side	Division	Closed August 1, 1949; demolished
Near North; Side	Oak	Closed July 31, 1949; demolished
Near North; Side	Chicago	CTA buses: 37 66
Near North; Side	Grand	Closed September 20, 1970; demolished
Near North; Side	Kinzie	Closed 1921; demolished; replaced by Grand
Near North; Side	Merchandise Mart	Chicago "L": Purple; CTA buses: 37, 125
The Loop	Randolph/Wells	Closed July 17, 1995; partially demolished and replaced by Washington/Wells
The Loop	Washington/Wells (outer platform)	Chicago "L": Orange Purple Pink; Metra: Union Pacific North, Union Pacific Northwest, Union Pacific West (at Ogilvie Transportation Center); CTA buses: J14 20 37 56 60 124 157
The Loop	Madison/Wells	Closed January 30, 1994; demolished and replaced by Washington/Wells
The Loop	Quincy (outer platform)	Metra: BNSF, Heritage Corridor, Milwaukee District North, Milwaukee District West, North Central Service, SouthWest Service (at Union Station); Amtrak long-distance: California Zephyr, Cardinal, City of New Orleans, Empire Builder, Floridian, Lake Shore Limited, Southwest Chief, Texas Eagle (at Union Station); Amtrak intercity: Blue Water, Borealis, Hiawatha, Illini and Saluki, Illinois Zephyr and Carl Sandburg, Lincoln Service, Pere Marquette, Wolverine (at Union Station); CTA buses: 1 7 28 37 126 130 134 135 136 151 156
The Loop	LaSalle/Van Buren (outer platform)	Metra: Rock Island (at LaSalle Street); CTA buses: 22 24 36 130
The Loop	Harold Washington Library (outer platform)	Chicago "L": Orange Purple Pink Red (at Jackson), Blue (at Jackson); CTA buses: 2 6 10 22 24 29 36 62 130 146 147 148
The Loop	Adams/Wabash (outer platform)	Chicago "L": Orange Green Purple Pink; CTA buses: 1 7 28 126 151
The Loop	Madison/Wabash	Closed March 16, 2015; demolished and replaced by Washington/Wabash.
The Loop	Washington/Wabash (outer platform)	Chicago "L": Red (at Lake) (Note: Temporarily, during the closure of State/Lake.); Metra: Metra Electric (at Millennium Station); NICTD: Lakeshore Corridor, Monon Corridor (at Millennium Station); CTA buses: N4 J14 20 56 60 N66 124 147 157
The Loop	Randolph/Wabash	Closed September 3, 2017; demolished and replaced by Washington/Wabash.
The Loop	~~State/Lake~~	Temporarily closed for reconstruction until mid-2029
The Loop	Clark/Lake (outer platform)	Chicago "L": Blue Green Purple Orange Pink; CTA buses: 22 24 134 135 136 156

- Note: After stopping at Clark/Lake, Brown Line trains return to Merchandise Mart, then make all stops back to Kimball.
