= Ravenswood branch =

Segment of the Chicago "L"

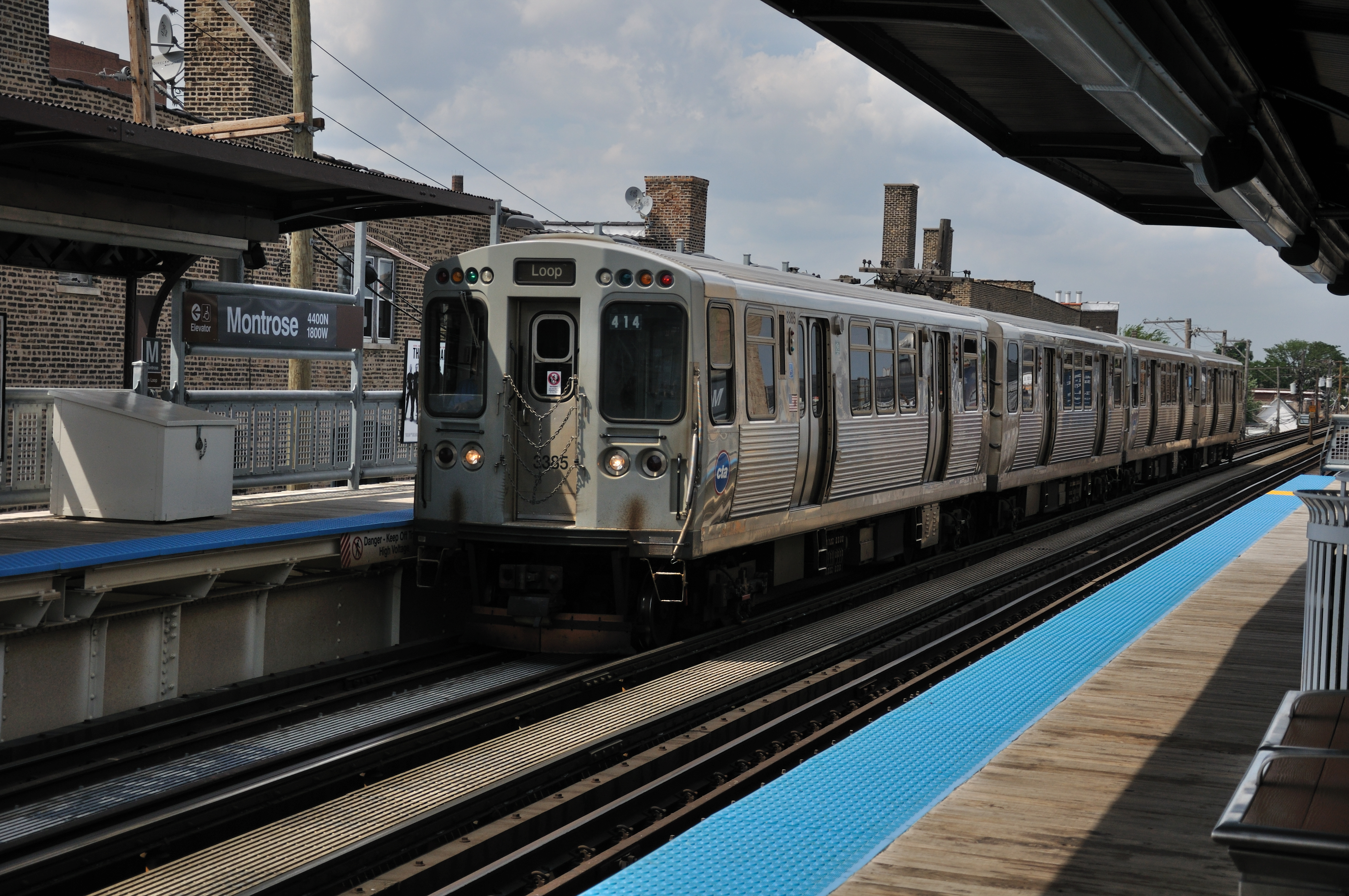
- A Brown Line train at Montrose

Overview
- Status: Operational
- Locale: Chicago, Illinois, United States
- Termini: Kimball; Belmont
- Stations: 11

Service
- Type: Rapid transit
- System: Chicago "L"
- Services: Brown
- Operator(s): Chicago Transit Authority (1947–present); Chicago Rapid Transit Company (1924–1947); Northwestern Elevated Railroad (1907–1924)
- Rolling stock: 2600-series, 3200-series
- Daily ridership: 30,616 (calculated average weekday 2019)

History
- Opened: May 18, 1907; 119 years ago

Technical
- Line length: 4.7 mi (7.6 km)
- Character: Elevated, At-Grade Level
- Track gauge: 4 ft 8 1/2 in (1,435 mm)
- Electrification: Third rail, 600 V DC

The Ravenswood branch is a 4.7 mi (7.6 km) long branch of the Chicago "L" in Chicago, Illinois. Operated by the Chicago Transit Authority, it carries the Brown Line. As of February 2013, an average of 30,949 passengers are served each weekday on this branch.

== Service ==
The Ravenswood Branch runs trains from Kimball to Belmont from 4:00 a.m. to 2:00 a.m. Monday thru Saturday and from 5:00 a.m. to 1:00 a.m. on Sundays/Holidays, and runs trains from Belmont to Kimball from 5:00 a.m. to 2:25 a.m. Monday thru Saturday and from 6:00 a.m. to 2:00 a.m. on Sundays/Holidays. The Ravenswood Branch serves the Lakeview, Roscoe Village, North Center, Ravenswood, Lincoln Square, Ravenswood Manor and Albany Park neighborhoods of Chicago, Illinois.

== History ==
After its main line began service on May 31, 1900, the Northwestern Elevated Railroad focused on other expansion possibilities especially to the north-west of the city to serve the densely populated areas of Ravenswood. Despite financial difficulties, the Northwestern Elevated made it a priority and initially proposed an extension beyond Wilson at ground level in order to reduce construction costs. However, this proposal faced significant opposition which forced them to instead proposed an elevated line. In 1903, the Northwestern Elevated Railroad submitted a proposal to the City of Chicago for an elevated line to be built along Irving Park Road from the Sheridan station to Ravenswood Avenue, turning north on Ravenswood, before again turning west at Leland Avenue and terminating at Western Avenue. The conditions of the franchise that Northwestern Elevated received from the city required that the line follow a path between Roscoe Street and Newport Avenue from the main line to Ravenswood Avenue, rather than Irving Park road as in its proposal to the city. In 1906, work on the new line started, and on May 18, 1907 service began between Belmont and Western. The surface level track to Kimball entered service on December 14, 1907, along with three intermediate stations: Francisco, Kedzie and Rockwell. Service from Western to Kimball was initially solely a shuttle operation until March 1909. In 1913, Crosstown service was implemented and the Ravenswood Branch was connected to the South Side Elevated Railroad's Kenwood branch via the Loop.

On August 1, 1949, the current routing of service on the Ravenswood Branch (known today as the Brown Line) was established, and the Ravenswood station was closed. In September 1973, the CTA closed the Paulina station. However, the CTA reopened Paulina a month later. In October 1973, work began on a new station at Kimball, which opened in October 1974. On February 21, 1993, the CTA color coded its lines, and the Ravenswood Line was officially renamed the Brown Line. Ridership on the Ravenswood Branch increased from 8.1 million passengers per year in 1987 to 10.6 million in 1998, largely due to an increase in population of the neighborhoods served by the branch. As a result of the increased ridership, in the summer of 2000, the CTA expanded service to the Loop until midnight and offered a shuttle route between Kimball and Belmont before and after the standard service so that passengers can reach the Red Line which runs 24/7 365 days a year.

== Station listing ==
Station	Location	Notes
Kimball	4755 N. Kimball Avenue	
Kedzie	4648 N. Kedzie Avenue	
Francisco	4648 N. Francisco Avenue	
Rockwell	4648 N. Rockwell Street	
Western	4648 N. Western Avenue	
Damen	4645 N. Damen Avenue	
Ravenswood	4530 N. Ravenswood Avenue	Closed August 1, 1949; demolished
Montrose	1817 W. Montrose Avenue	
Irving Park	1816 W. Irving Park Road	
Addison	1818 W. Addison Street	
Paulina	3410 N. Lincoln Avenue	
Southport	3411 N. Southport Avenue	
Belmont	945 W. Belmont Avenue	

== Image gallery ==
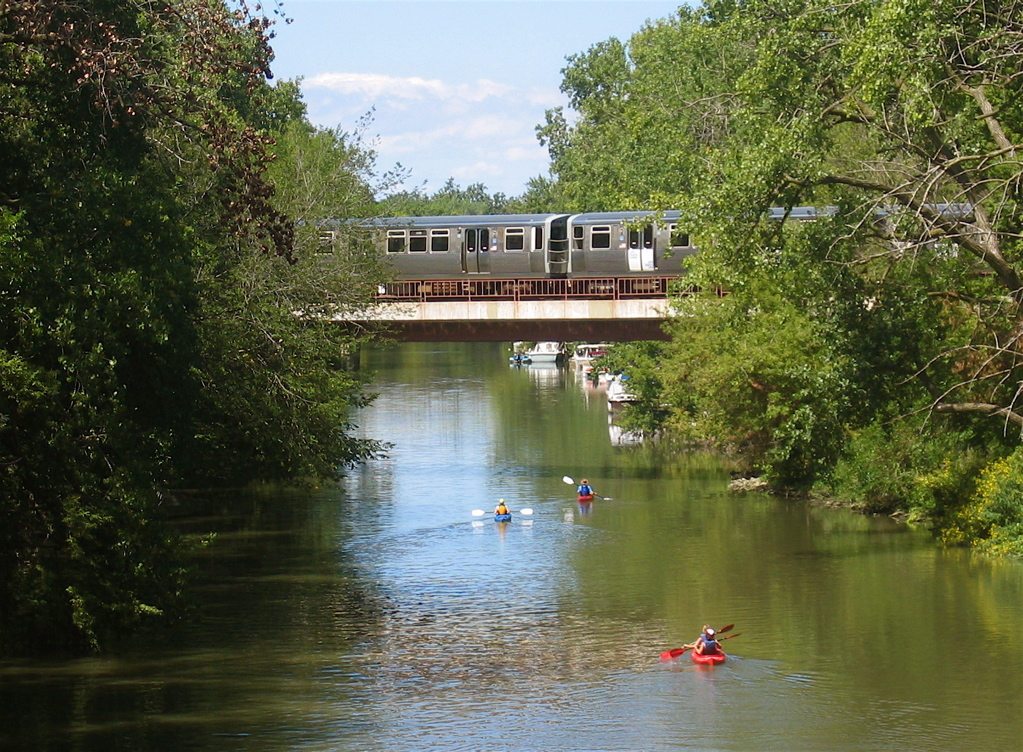
A Brown Line train crossing the North Branch of the Chicago River

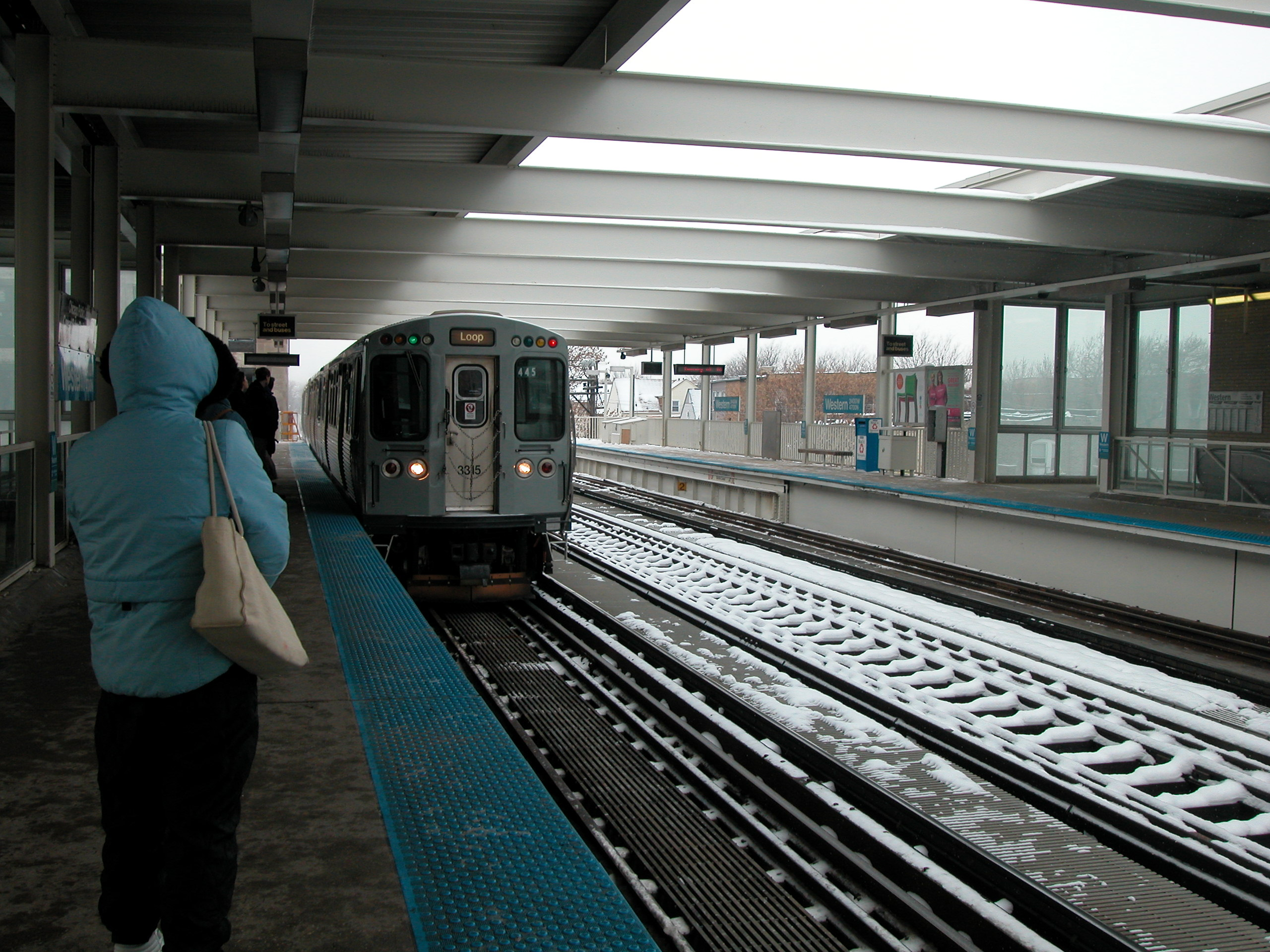
A Brown Line train at Western and heading eastbound

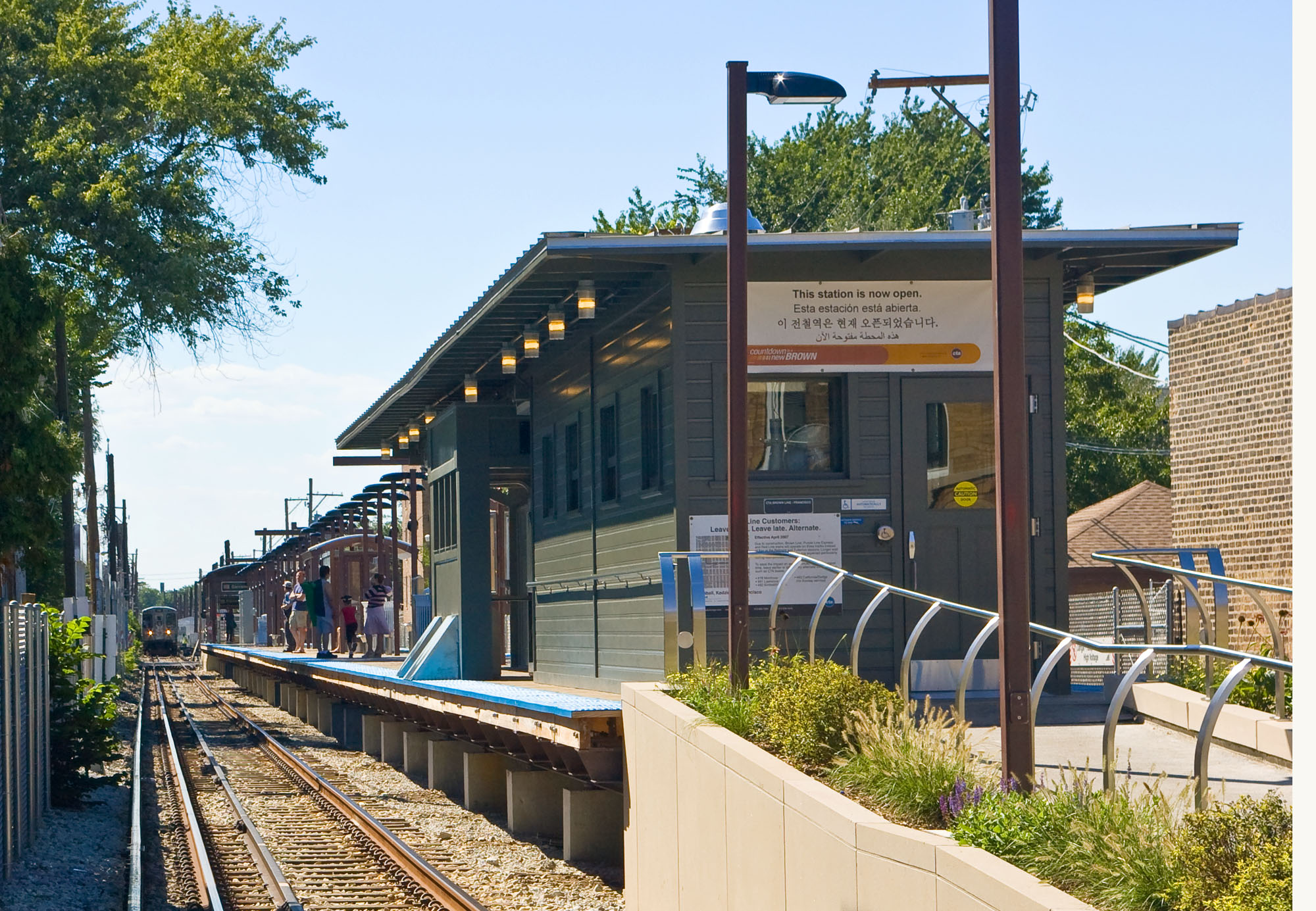
A Brown Line train approaching Francisco

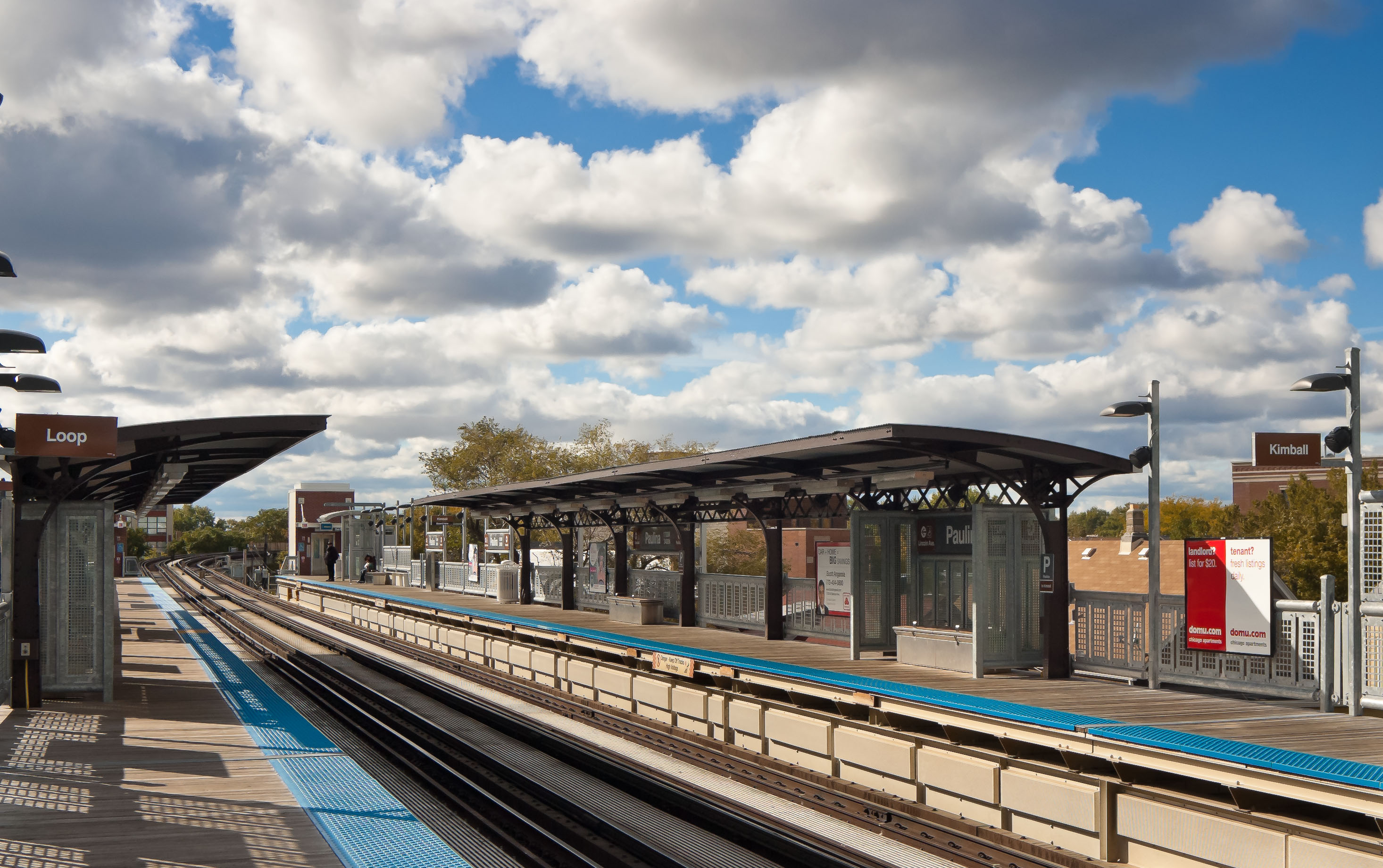
The new platforms of the Paulina station
