= Ravenswood–Wilson station =

Defunct Chicago commuter railroad station

Ravenswood–Wilson

General information
- Location: Ravenswood Avenue and Wilson Avenue; Chicago, Illinois 60640
- Coordinates: 41.9648°N 87.6743°W
- Line: Milwaukee Division
- Platforms: 2 side platforms
- Tracks: 3

History
- Closed: 1960s
- Former names: Wilson Avenue

Services
Preceding station	Chicago and North Western Railway	Following station
Summerdale toward Milwaukee	Milwaukee Division	Northcenter toward Chicago
Rogers Park (1958–closure) toward Milwaukee	Milwaukee Division	Clybourn (1958-closure) toward Chicago
Location

Ravenswood–Wilson was a commuter railroad station on the Chicago and North Western Railway's Milwaukee Division, now the Union Pacific North Line, in the U.S. state of Illinois. The station was located at Wilson and Ravenswood Avenues, in Chicago's Ravenswood neighborhood.

== Details ==
From 1907 to 1948, connections were available to the Chicago 'L' via the adjacent Ravenswood rapid transit station.

By the 1950s, Chicago and North Western management began to reassess its commuter service and concluded that the road could be operated more economically and efficiently by closing stations in and near Chicago and focusing on suburban and long-haul traffic. In June 1958, the company went before the Illinois Commerce Commission requesting permission to abandon more than twenty stops, alter train schedules, revise its ticketing structure, and raise fares on monthly tickets. On November 14, the ICC ruled in favor of granting the majority of the North Western's requests, however, unlike the other targeted stations, Ravenswood–Wilson was selected for replacement by a new station at Lawrence Avenue, a major "mile-street" on the Chicago street grid. The fare increase and service alterations went into effect on December 1, 1958, and the twenty one other stations either in or near Chicago on the Milwaukee, Geneva, and Wisconsin Divisions were abandoned. Ravenswood–Wilson, however, remained open for several years. Although proposed in 1958, the petition before the ICC to move the station to Lawrence Avenue didn't occur until July 3, 1963. Approval occurred later that month.

Ravenswood–Wilson closed and was replaced by the new Ravenswood station.
