= Kedzie station (CTA Brown Line) =

Chicago "L" station

Kedzie 3200W 4700N
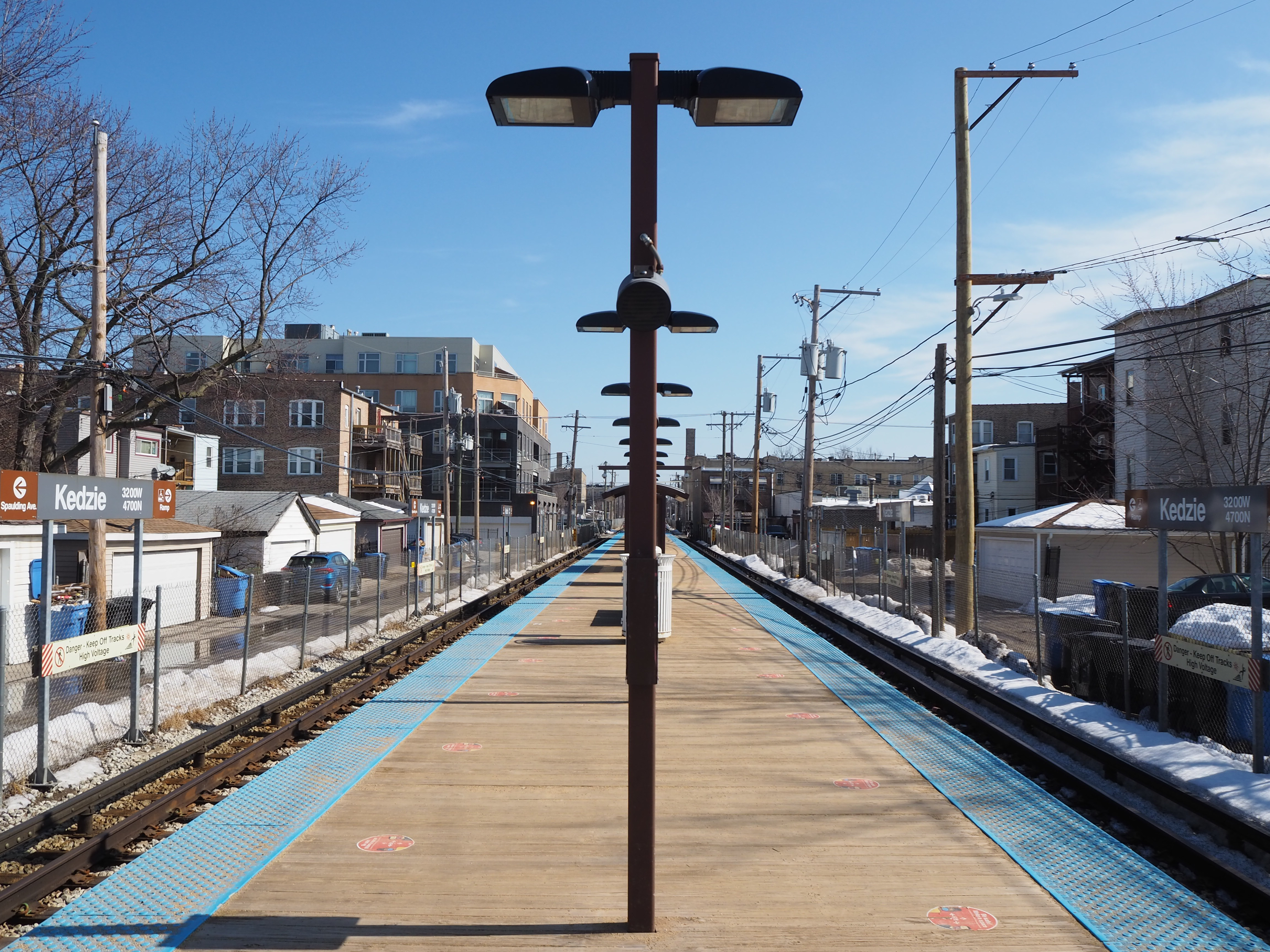

General information
- Location: 4648 North Kedzie Avenue; Chicago, Illinois 60625
- Coordinates: 41.966099°N 87.709426°W
- Owner: Chicago Transit Authority
- Line: Ravenswood Branch
- Platforms: 1 island platform
- Tracks: 2

Construction
- Structure type: At-grade
- Accessible: Yes

History
- Opened: December 14, 1907; 118 years ago
- Rebuilt: 1975; 51 years ago, 2006; 20 years ago

Passengers
- 2025: 429,953 ▲3.8%

Services
Preceding station	Chicago "L"	Following station
Kimball Terminus	Brown Line	Francisco toward Loop (Washington/Wells)
Track layout
Location

Kedzie is an 'L' station on the CTA's Brown Line. It is an at-grade station located in Chicago's Albany Park neighborhood at 4648 North Kedzie, with an auxiliary entrance at 4649 North Spaulding Avenue. The adjacent stations are Kimball, the terminus of the line about one-third of a mile (0.54 km) to the north west, and Francisco, which is located about one-third of a mile (0.54 km) to the east.

The station and nearby Kedzie Avenue are both named after John H. Kedzie, an early Chicago real-estate developer.

== History ==
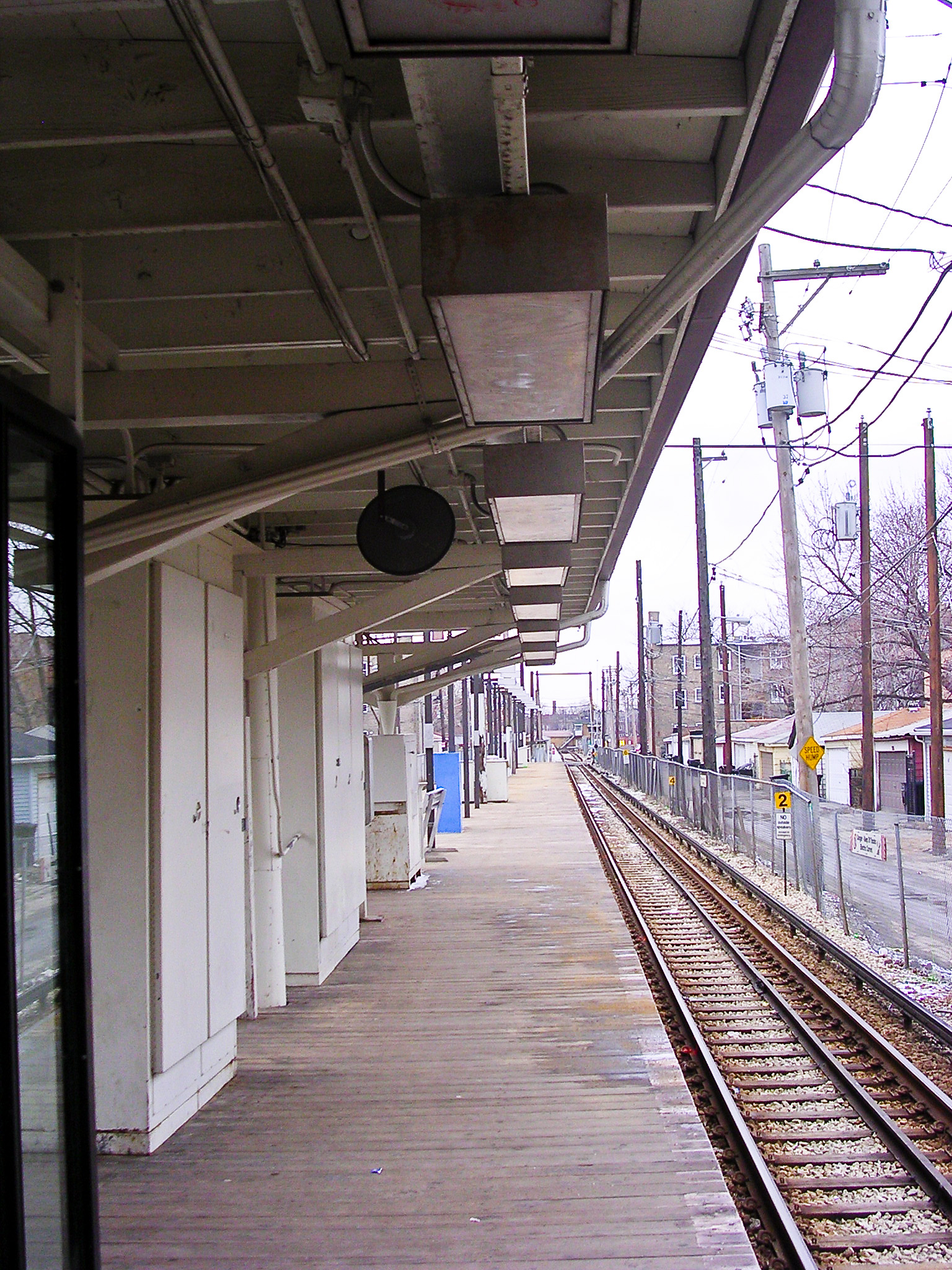
Kedzie station before rebuilding, February 2006

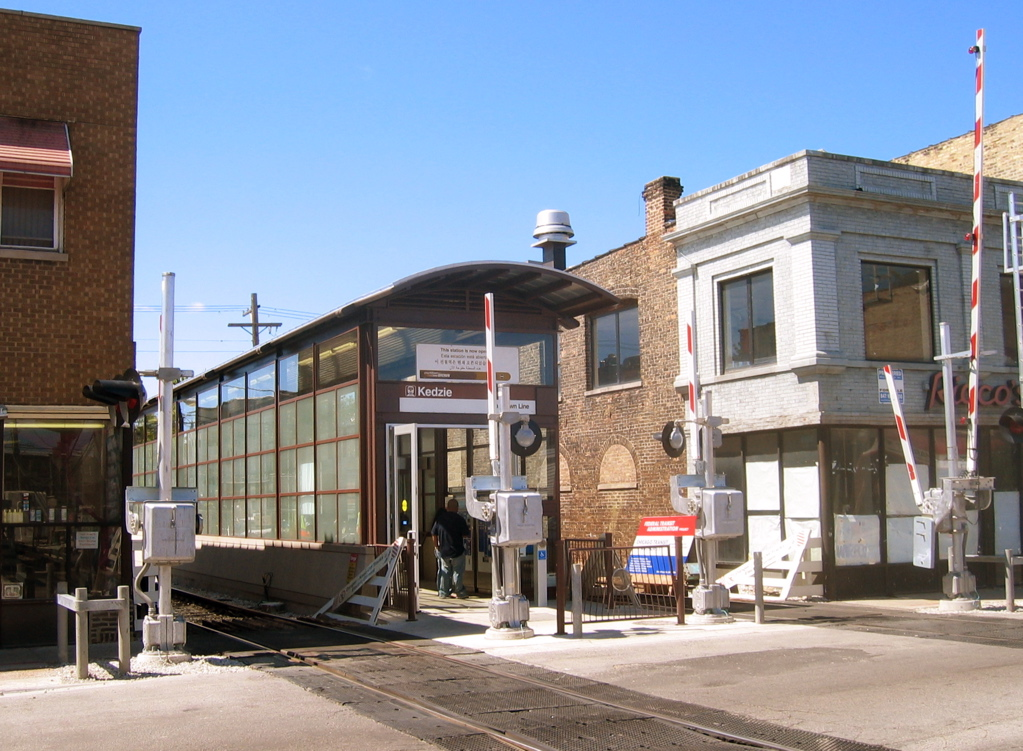
Newly rebuilt Kedzie station house, August 2006

Kedzie Station was originally constructed in 1907 as part of Northwestern Elevated Railroad's Ravenswood line. The station house was replaced in 1975, and the whole station was demolished and rebuilt in 2006 as part of the Brown Line Capacity Expansion Project. The new station, which opened on August 16, 2006, can support eight railcars, and is accessible to passengers with disabilities.

On October 1, 2009, the parking lot for this station was closed.

== 1977 fatal accident ==
This station was the site of a fatal 1977 accident involving an intoxicated Korean immigrant who was electrocuted by the third rail while attempting to urinate on the track. The CTA was found 50 percent responsible and the $1.5 million judgment against them was eventually affirmed by the Illinois Supreme Court in 1992. The majority opinion, signed by Justice Charles E. Freeman, noted that there was evidence before the trial court that this particular stretch of railroad line is one of the only railroad lines in the United States that uses an unprotected, unguarded, and unfenced third rail.

== Bus connections ==
CTA

- 93 California/Dodge
