= Kimball station =

Chicago "L" station

Kimball 4800N 3400W
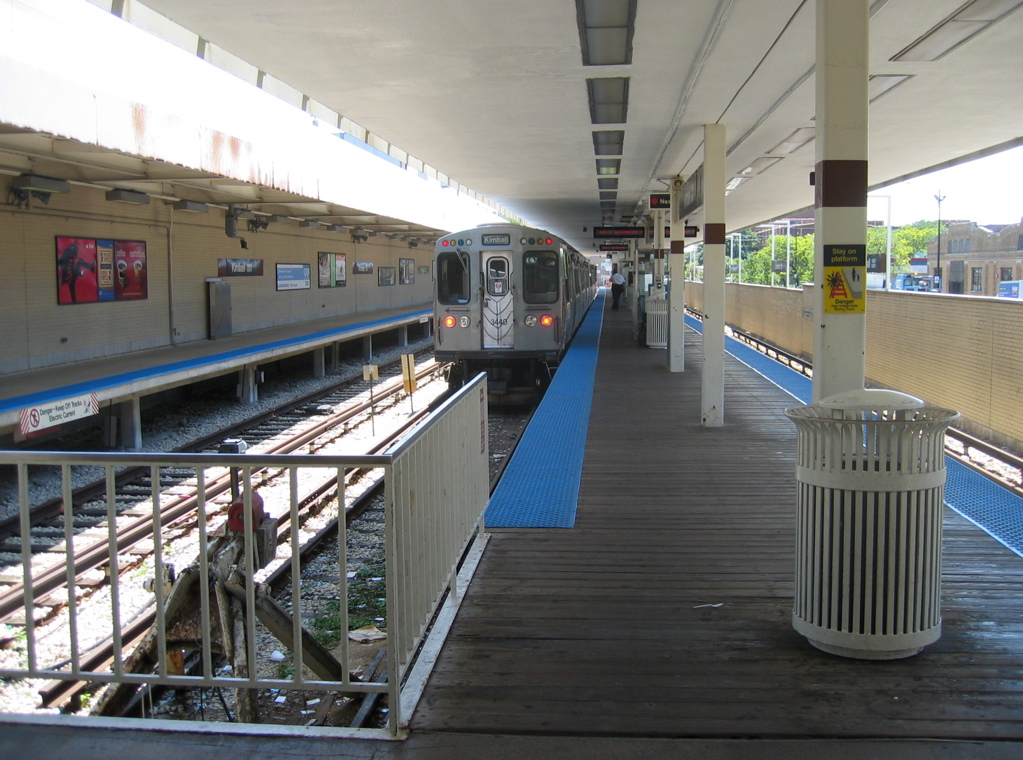

General information
- Location: 4755 North Kimball Avenue; Chicago, Illinois 60625
- Coordinates: 41.967628°N 87.712934°W
- Owner: Chicago Transit Authority
- Line: Ravenswood branch
- Platforms: 1 island platform 1 side platform
- Tracks: 3

Construction
- Structure type: At-grade
- Platform levels: 1
- Parking: 73 spaces
- Cycle facilities: Yes
- Accessible: Yes

History
- Opened: December 14, 1907; 118 years ago
- Rebuilt: 1974; 52 years ago, 2006–2007; 19 years ago (renovated)

Passengers
- 2025: 835,538 ▼2.8%

Services
Preceding station	Chicago "L"	Following station
Terminus	Brown Line	Kedzie toward Loop (Washington/Wells)
Track layout
Location

Kimball is an 'L' station and the terminus of the CTA's Brown Line. It is located in Chicago's Albany Park neighborhood. From Kimball, trains run south and then east to Kedzie, which is about 0.33 miles (0.53 km) away. During regular hours trains are scheduled to depart from Kimball every 7–10 minutes, and take about 33 minutes to reach the Loop.

The station and nearby Kimball Avenue are both named after Martin Kimbell, a 19th century farmer who owned land in the area that is today known as Logan Square.

== History ==
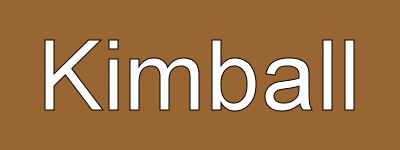
Kimball destination sign

The original station at Kimball was constructed by the Northwestern Elevated Railroad and opened on December 14, 1907. This station was demolished and a new station built in its place in 1974. The newly opened station was used for filming for the 1975 film, Cooley High. The station has three tracks which are served by an island platform and a side platform; there is also a train storage yard and a workshop alongside the station.

=== Brown Line Capacity Expansion Project ===
Although Kimball Station was rebuilt in 1974 it was still upgraded as part of the Brown Line Capacity Expansion Project. The station closed from September 15, 2006 to January 12, 2007. During this closure, the two platforms were extended to support eight railcars, and the station entrance was reconfigured to be accessible to passengers with disabilities.

== Bus connections ==
CTA

- 81 Lawrence (Owl Service)
- 82 Kimball/Homan
