= North Center, Chicago =

Community area in Chicago, Illinois

North Center
- Community area
- Community Area 05 - North Center
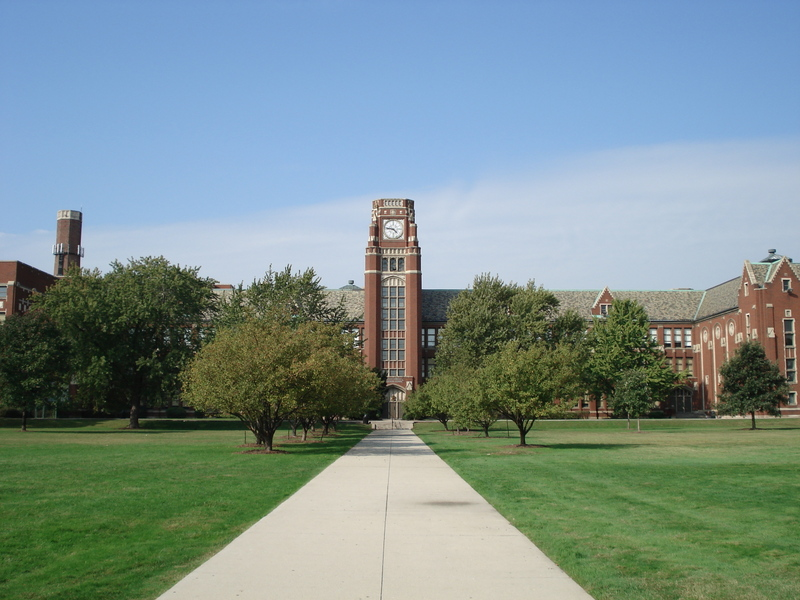
- The clocktower of Lane Technical College Prep High School, located in the western part of the neighborhood.

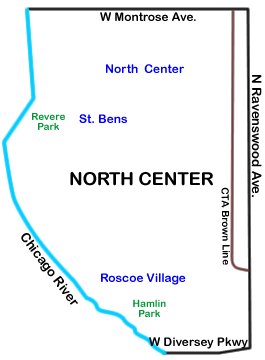
- Streetmap

- Location within the city of Chicago
- Coordinates: 41°57′N 87°40.8′W
- Country: United States
- State: Illinois
- County: Cook
- City: Chicago
- Neighborhoods: List: Northcenter; Roscoe Village; Horner Park; St. Ben's; Lathrop Homes; Hamlin Park

Area
  - Total: 2.07 sq mi (5.36 km^{2})

Population (2024)
  - Total: 36,014
  - Density: 17,400/sq mi (6,720/km^{2})

Demographics 2024
  - White: 73.3%
  - Black: 2.3%
  - Hispanic: 11.8%
  - Asian: 6.2%
  - Other: 6.2%

Educational Attainment 2024
  - High School Diploma or Higher: 97.3%
  - Bachelor's Degree or Higher: 80.4%
- Time zone: UTC−6 (CST)
  - Summer (DST): UTC−5 (CDT)
- ZIP Codes: parts of 60613, 60618, 60657
- Median household income 2024: $145,659
- Source: U.S. Census, Record Information Services

North Center is one of the 77 community areas of Chicago in Illinois, United States, located in the city's North Side. North Center is bordered on the north by Montrose Avenue, on the south by Diversey Parkway, on the west by the Chicago River and on the east by Ravenswood Avenue; it includes the neighborhoods of Northcenter, Roscoe Village, St. Ben's, and Hamlin Park. The Brown Line of the Chicago 'L' has stops within the community area at Addison, Irving Park, and Montrose.

== Northcenter ==
The neighborhood known as Northcenter refers to a neighborhood in the North Side of Chicago, Illinois. The boundaries of Northcenter are Addison on the south, Montrose on the north, the Chicago River on the west and Ravenswood (1800 W) on the east. Northcenter has grown since the 1870s when the area was only accessible by the Chicago River and Little Fort Road (now known as Lincoln Avenue). Northcenter is considered a vibrant neighborhood with an eclectic mix of retailers, restaurants, live music, live theater, and service-oriented businesses. It is also home to some of the best public schools in the City of Chicago. Lane Tech College Prep High School, a top ranked well-rounded and diverse high school in the state; as well as North Park Elementary School, Coonley & Bell Elementary. Northcenter was voted one of Chicago's best neighborhoods by the Chicago Magazine in 2014.

Northcenter's history is deeply rooted in European cultural influences, from German, Polish, Czech, Romanian, Serbian, Greek, Croatian, French making the majority and that history can be seen in the architectural charm of the homes and buildings from the late 19th and early 20th centuries. Also during this time, the Selig Polyscope Company produced some of America's earliest motion pictures and was based in Chicago. Along Byron Street near Oakley Ave and Western Ave, historic production buildings of the company are still standing and being used as residences and retail businesses. The neighborhood continues to grow and become more culturally diverse. The neighborhood includes bowling alleys, three city parks - including an indoor ice arena, a nearby library, a nearby movie theater complex, and Northcenter Town Square. The Northcenter Chamber of Commerce hosts many free family and community events throughout the year. Northcenter Town Square is also home to a Farmer's Market on Saturdays from June to October.

== Roscoe Village ==
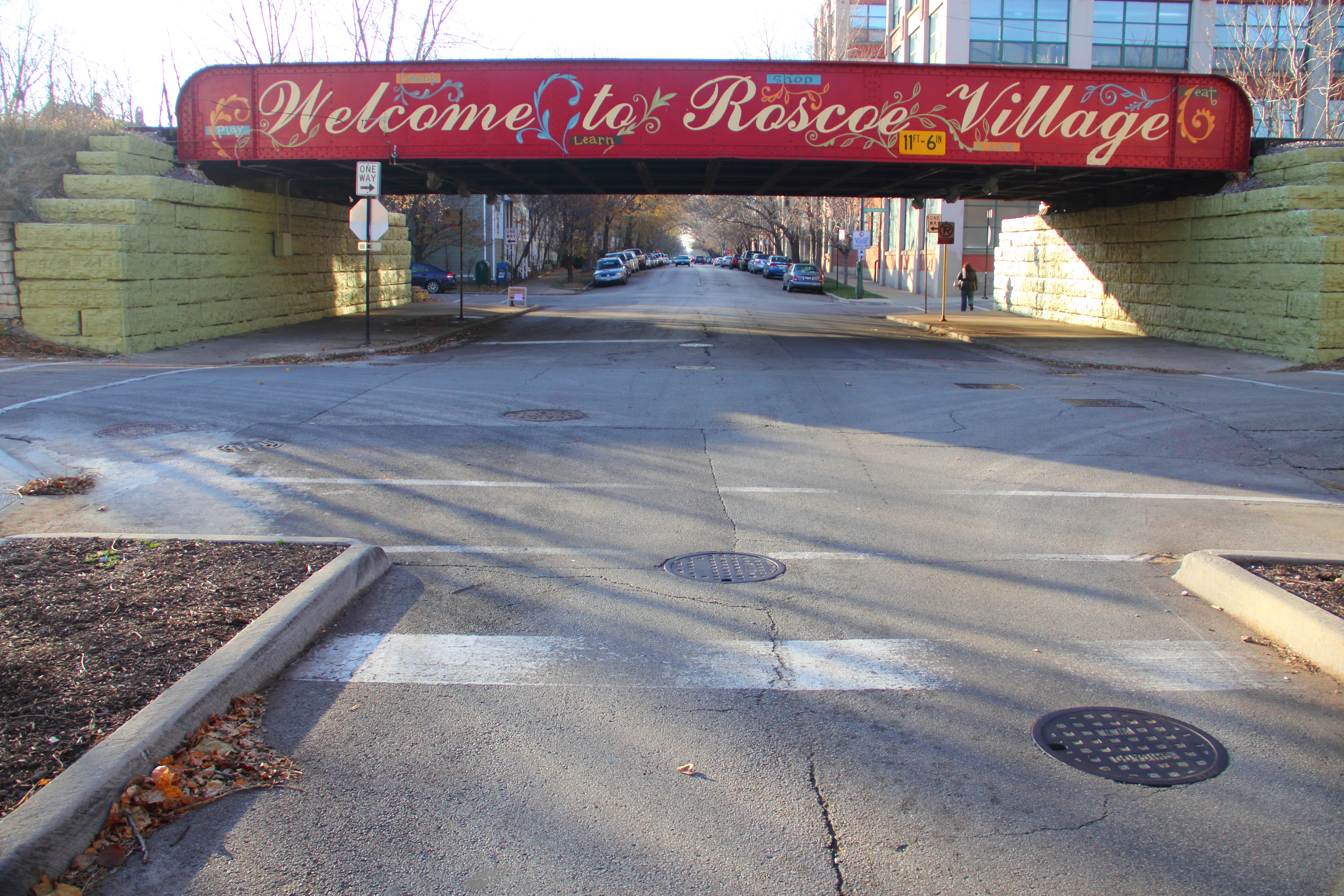
"Welcome to Roscoe Village" sign on Roscoe at Metra overpass

Roscoe Village refers to a neighborhood in the North Side of Chicago, Illinois. While not part of any official city map, Chicago residents perceive the boundaries of the neighborhood to be Addison Street to the north, Belmont Avenue to the south, Ravenswood Avenue to the east and the Chicago River to the west. The primary feature of Roscoe Village is Roscoe Street, an east–west street which bisects the neighborhood's northern and southern halves. Roscoe Street is populated by businesses and residences. In 2023 the area was estimated to have 10,843 residents.

From 1904 to 1967, Roscoe Village was home to the "largest amusement park in the world", Riverview Park, a 76-acre (31 ha) amusement park stretching from Belmont Avenue to Lane Tech High School, and from Western Ave. to the Chicago River. Today, the Area 3 Police Headquarters, DePaul College Prep, and Riverview Plaza Center now stand on the space.

== St. Ben's ==
St. Ben's is an unofficial neighborhood with boundaries at Irving Park Road on the north, Addison Street on the south, Damen Avenue on the east, and Western Ave. on the west. It is named for Saint Benedict's Parish, with its Roman Catholic school, on Leavitt Street. Since 2021, St. Ben's has the first Chicago outpost of Dave's Hot Chicken.

== Hamlin Park ==
The Hamlin Park neighborhood is bounded by Belmont Avenue on the north, Ravenswood Avenue on the east, the Diversey Parkway on the south and the North Branch of the Chicago River on the west. It has its namesake park in the center of the neighborhood. This neighborhood also has the northern half of the Julia C. Lathrop Homes, a CHA housing project.

Historical population
Census	Pop.	Note	%±
1930	47,651		—
1940	48,759		2.3%
1950	47,787		−2.0%
1960	43,877		−8.2%
1970	39,378		−10.3%
1980	35,161		−10.7%
1990	33,010		−6.1%
2000	31,895		−3.4%
2010	31,867		−0.1%
2020	35,114		10.2%
2024 (est.)	36,014		2.6%

== Politics ==
North Center has reliably supported the Democratic Party, and signs were visible in the neighborhood during the elections. But it's percentages were below the city as a whole

== Places of interest ==
- Cook County Circuit Court
- WGN-TV Studios
- Chicago Fire Soccer Center
- Clark Park Boat House
- Kerry Wood Cubs Field
- Chicago rat hole

=== Schools ===
- Audubon Elementary School
- Bell Elementary School
- Coonley Elementary School
- Chamberlain College of Nursing
- DeVry Institute of Technology
- DePaul College Prep (formerly known as Gordon Tech High School)
- Jahn Elementary School
- James Adams Alternative High School
- Lane Technical High School
- North Park Elementary School
- Pilgrim Lutheran School
- St. Benedict Elementary School
- St. Benedict High School
- Hamilton Elementary School

=== Former places of interest ===
- Riverview Park, now the site of DePaul College Prep High School (see above)
- American Theater Company, which shuttered in 2018.

== Notable people ==
- Robert E. Gerstung (1915–1979), soldier and recipient of the Medal of Honor for heroic actions during World War II. In 1951, he resided at 3042 North Oakley Avenue.
- Joseph F. Fanta (1914–1988), member of the Illinois House of Representatives during the 74th Illinois General Assembly. He resided at 2156 West Waveland Avenue during his time in the legislature.
- John J. Hoellen Jr. (1914–1999), member of the Chicago City Council from 1947 until 1975. Hollen resided at 1842 W. Larchmont Ave. for most of his life.
- Glen Hansard (1970–2026), Irish musician, lived in North Center from the late 1990s to the early 2000s.
- Steve Wilkos (b. 1964), television personality. He was a childhood resident of Roscoe Village.

== General and cited references ==
- "Roscoe Village Chamber of Commerce Map" (http://www.rvcc.biz/map.asp). Retrieved Oct. 24, 2006
- "Roscoe Village Chamber of Commerce Directory" (http://www.rvcc.biz/directory.asp). Retrieved Oct. 24, 2006
- Hadley, Chuck (2002). "A History of Roscoe Village and RVN" (http://www.roscoevillage.org/Default.aspx?pageId=46910). Retrieved Sept. 10, 2008.
- "2000 U.S. Census: Table DP-1. Profile of General Demographics Characteristics: 2000. Geographic area: Roscoe village, Illinois" (http://censtats.census.gov/data/IL/1601765611.pdf) Retrieved Mar. 22, 2005.
