= Lincoln Avenue (disambiguation) =

Lincoln Avenue is an avenue in Chicago, Illinois, United States.

Lincoln Avenue may also refer to:

- Lincoln Avenue (Pasadena), an avenue in Pasadena and Altadena, California, USA
- Lincoln Avenue, an avenue in Lockport, New York, USA
- Lincoln Avenue, an avenue in Mount Vernon, New York, USA, which crosses New York State Route 22
- Lincoln Avenue, a residential street and tower block housing complex in Knightswood, Glasgow, Scotland
- Lincoln Avenue, an avenue in the Bronx
- Lincoln Avenue, an avenue in Staten Island, New York, USA
- Lincoln Avenue (Orange County), an avenue in the cities of Anaheim, Orange, Buena Park, and Cypress, California. The portion between Euclid Street in Anaheim and Bloomfield Avenue in Cypress was originally part of SR 214, but this portion was eventually relinquished to local jurisdictions.
