= Western Avenue (Chicago) =

Thoroughfare in Chicago, Illinois, United States

- Asbury Avenue; Western Boulevard; 2400 West
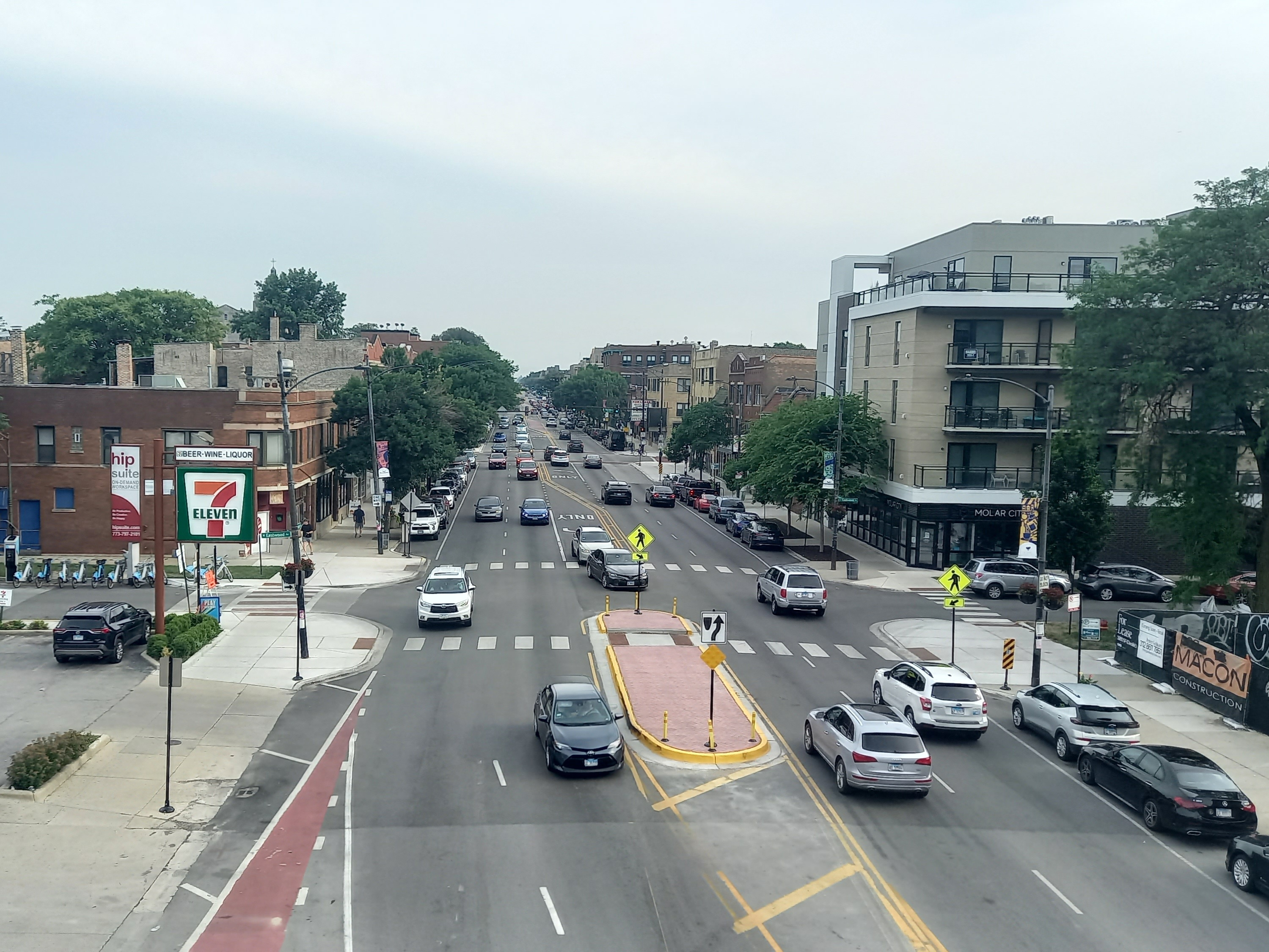
- Western Avenue at a Brown Line station
- Former name: 24th Avenue
- Length: 36.38 mi (58.55 km)
- Location: Will and Cook counties, Illinois, United States
- South end: CR 21 in University Park
- Major junctions: US 30 in Olympia Fields; Hutchinson Avenue / Harwood Avenue in Flossmoor; IL 83 in Posen; US 12 / US 20 in Evergreen Park; I-290 / IL 110 (CKC) in Chicago; IL 64 in Chicago; I-90 / I-94 in Chicago; IL 19 in Chicago; US 41 in Chicago; US 14 in Chicago
- North end: Howard Street in Chicago

Western Avenue is a street within the city of Chicago. Western Avenue extends south as a continuous road to the Dixie Highway at Sibley Boulevard (Illinois Route 83) in Dixmoor, giving the road a total length of 27.38 miles (44.06 km). Western Avenue extends from the north side city boundary of Chicago at Howard Street and on the south side at Crete-Monee Road in Crete. However, Western Avenue extends intermittently through the Southland to the Will/Kankakee county border in unincorporated Will Township. Within Chicago's grid street system, Western Avenue is 2400 West, three miles west of State Street (0 East/West). Western Avenue is the longest continuous road in Chicago.

Western Avenue becomes Asbury Avenue at Howard Street at the Chicago/Evanston border. Unlike Pulaski Road, which was originally Crawford Avenue in both the city and suburbs, Western was always the name in the city. Asbury is only used in Evanston. Western Avenue is also known as Western Boulevard for a 3 mile stretch where it runs on parallel roads from Garfield Boulevard until 31st Boulevard, whereupon Western reverts into a single road after crossing the Chicago Sanitary and Ship Canal, while Western Boulevard merges into 31st Boulevard as part of Chicago's boulevard system.

In the suburbs, Western Avenue constitutes the boundary between several of Cook County's southern townships. North of 135th Street, Worth Township is on the west and Calumet Township is on the east; from 135th to 183rd Streets, Bremen Township is on the west and Thornton Township is on the east; and south of 183rd Street, Rich Township is on the west and Bloom Township is on the east.

== History ==
From 1851 to 1869, Western Avenue delineated the western edge of the city of Chicago. Being at the edge of town, it became a picnic spot, and Riverview Park was built at the intersection of Western and Belmont Avenues. The amusement park remained open from 1904 until 1967. The park's property is now home to the Riverview Plaza shopping center, the Belmont District Chicago Police Station, and DeVry University.

Rosehill Cemetery is also located on Western Avenue in the Lincoln Square neighborhood.

== Transportation ==
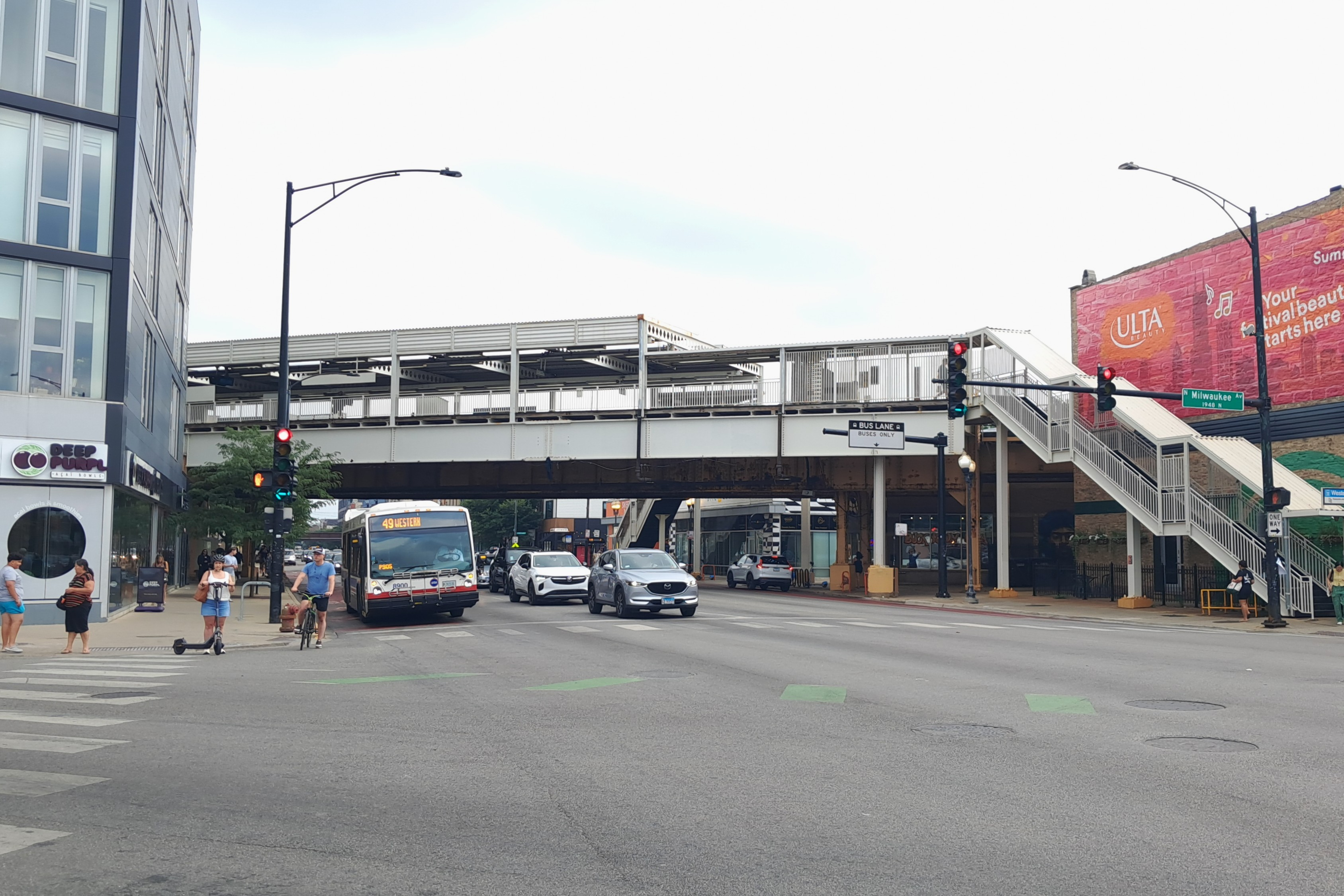
CTA 49 Western bus at Western station

Western Avenue is serviced by many CTA bus and "L" routes.

The street is serviced by multiple "L" lines: the Brown Line at Eastwood Avenue, the Orange Line at 49th Street, the Pink Line at 21st Street, and twice on the Blue Line at Milwaukee Avenue and the Eisenhower Expressway. On Metra, the BNSF Line serves Western Avenue at 18th Street; the North Central Service and the Milwaukee District lines (West and North) serve Western Avenue at Hubbard Street. The Blue Island–Vermont Street station on both the Rock Island District and the Metra Electric District (Blue Island branch) is a few blocks east of Western Avenue in Blue Island.

There are three CTA buses that run along Western Avenue. The main bus route along Western Avenue is 49 Western, which runs 24/7 from Berwyn Avenue in Lincoln Square to 79th Street in Ashburn. The entire bus route is complemented by the X49 Western Express, a weekday rush hour express service. The 49B North Western runs from Howard Street at the city's northern border to Leland Avenue, where it connects to a Brown Line station. The 349 South Western bus route, which is operated by Pace, has completely replaced CTA service on the former 49A South Western route. This route runs from 79th Street in Chicago to the Pace Harvey Transportation Center in Harvey, Illinois.

== Parades ==
=== South Side Irish Parade ===
Western Avenue also played host to the South Side Irish Parade. Held yearly on the Sunday before St. Patrick's Day, along Western between 103rd and 115th Street in the Beverly and Morgan Park neighborhoods, it was the city's largest neighborhood parade, drawing hundreds of thousands of revelers annually.

The parade was canceled after the 2009 event due to a growing number of public intoxication arrests. There continues to be an annual Irish Festival, to replace the initially family-oriented parade. In 2012, the parade returned.

=== Chicagoland Toys for Tots Motorcycle Parade ===
Since 1979, Western Avenue has been the venue for what is billed as the largest motorcycle parade in the world. On the first Sunday of December, thousands of motorcyclists assemble at the Dan Ryan Woods Forest Preserve at 87th Street and Western Avenue, bringing new, unwrapped toys for donation to the Toys for Tots charity. The parade drives north to deposit toys at Lane Tech at Addison Street, a distance of over 15 miles (24 km). From 1979 through 2008, the parade instead continued north to deliver the toys to the U.S. Marine Corps Reserve station on Foster Avenue, a total distance in excess of 18 miles (29 km).

== Major intersections ==
County	Location	mi	km	Destinations	Notes
Will	University Park	0.0	0.0	CR 21 (Crete-Monee Road) / CR 53 begins	Southern terminus, beginning of CR 53 concurrency
Will	University Park	1.7	2.7	CR 49 east (Exchange Street)	
Will–Cook county line	Park Forest	3.5	5.6	CR C13 east (Steger Road) / CR 53 ends	End of CR 53 concurrency
Cook	Olympia Fields	6.0	9.7	US 30 (Lincoln Highway)	
Cook	Flossmoor	8.5	13.7	CR B65 west (Flossmoor Road)	
Cook	Flossmoor	9.0	14.5	Hutchinson Avenue, Harwood Avenue	Northern terminus of southern section
Cook	Gap in route				
Cook	Posen	9.0	14.5	IL 83 (Sibley Boulevard)	Southern terminus of northern section
Cook	Evergreen Park	15.8	25.4	US 12 / US 20 (95th Street)	
Cook	Chicago	17.8	28.6	CR B40 east (79th Street)	
Cook	Chicago			Historic US 66 (Ogden Avenue)	
Cook	Chicago			I-290 (Eisenhower Expressway) / IL 110 (CKC)	I-290 exit 27C
Cook	Chicago			CR B22 (Augusta Boulevard)	
Cook	Chicago			IL 64 (North Avenue)	
Cook	Chicago			I-90 / I-94 (Kennedy Expressway)	I-90/I-94 exit 47A, westbound exit and eastbound entrance
Cook	Chicago			IL 19 (Irving Park Road)	
Cook	Chicago			US 41 (Foster Avenue)	
Cook	Chicago			US 14 (Peterson Avenue)	
Cook	Chicago			Howard Street	Northern terminus
1.000 mi = 1.609 km; 1.000 km = 0.621 mi: Concurrency terminus; Incomplete access
