= The Cubby Bear =

Sports bar and music venue in Chicago, Illinois

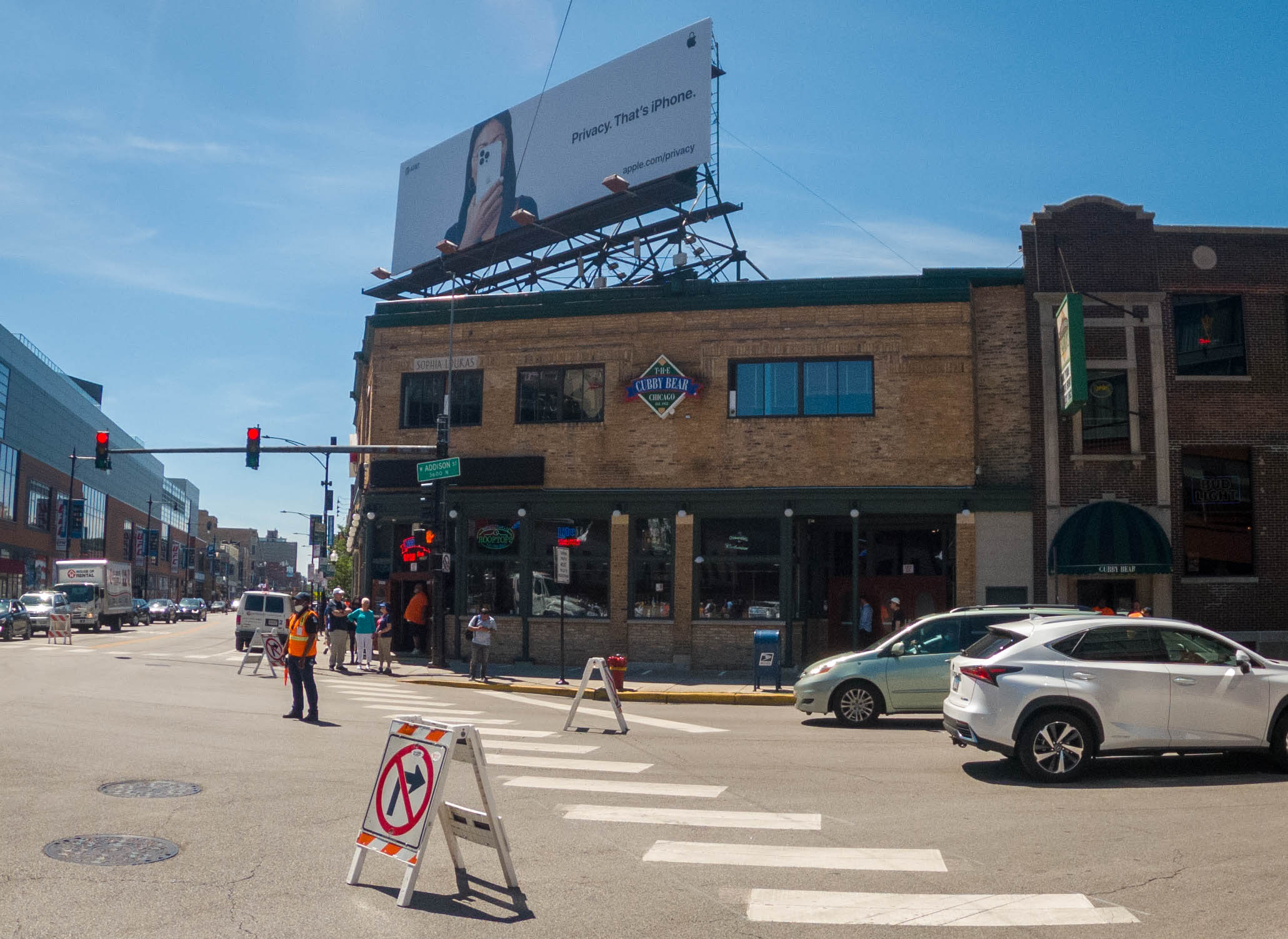
- The Cubby Bear in 2022

- Location within Chicago metropolitan area

General information
- Location: 1059 W. Addison; Chicago, IL
- Coordinates: 41.9470°N 87.6567°W
- Opened: 1953

Website
- www.cubbybear.com

The Cubby Bear is a sports bar, eatery, and music venue in Wrigleyville, Chicago, Illinois.

The Cubby Bear is located at Addison and Clark Streets across from Wrigley Field, home of the Chicago Cubs. It was established in 1953 and is formally known as the Cubs Pub and Cubs Grill. The bar has won a few awards including Best Rock Club by the Chicago Music Awards, #1 Neighborhood Bar in Chicago by Maxim magazine and even 7th best sports bar in the United States by Sports Illustrated. The restaurant includes private rooms that overlook Wrigley Field. The management of the Cubby Bear also caters and organizes the booking of three buildings on Sheffield and Waveland which each have a Wrigley Roof.
