= 2424 North Lincoln Avenue =

Building in Chicago, Illinois, United States

2424 North Lincoln Avenue is a building in Lincoln Park, Chicago, adjacent to the Biograph Theater. From 1912 to 2006, it variously housed the Fullerton Theater, an auto garage, the Crest Theater, and the 3-Penny Cinema. Since 2009 it has been Lincoln Hall, a music venue.

== Early history ==
The building first opened as the Fullerton Theatre, a nickelodeon, in 1912. In 1915 it was converted into an auto garage. FBI agents took aim at John Dillinger from the roof of the building in 1934.

It opened again as the Crest Theater in 1938.

== The 3-Penny Cinema ==
The building was named the 3-Penny Cinema in 1964. It was known for playing second-run films and "midnight movies". It was the first theater in Chicago to screen the pornographic film Deep Throat. The cinema continued to operate until it closed in 2006 due to taxes the owner owed to the City of Chicago.

== Lincoln Hall ==
Lincoln Hall
- LH
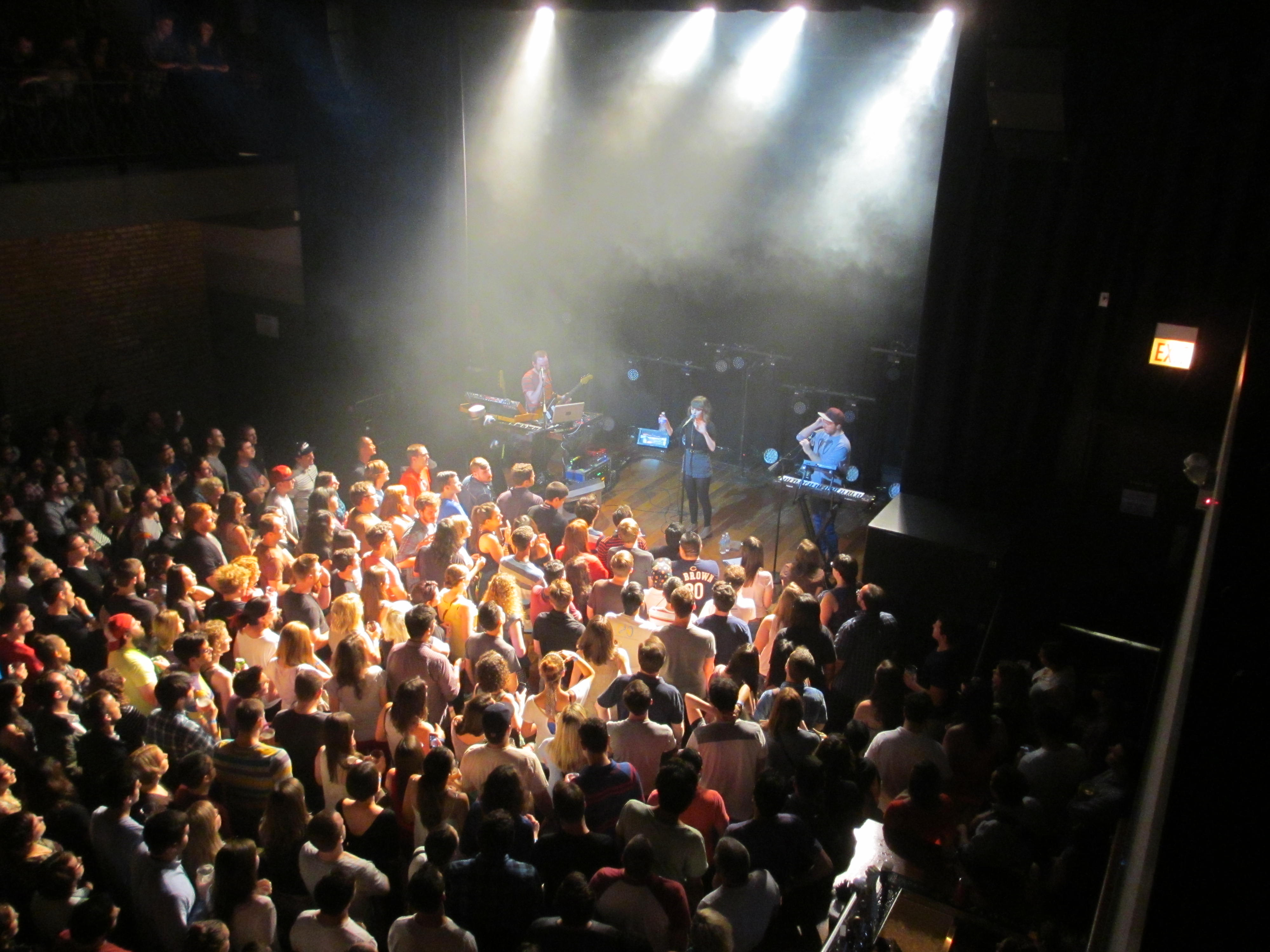
- Inside Lincoln Hall
- Interactive map of Lincoln Hall
- Address: 2424 N. Lincoln Avenue
- Location: Chicago, Illinois
- Coordinates: 41.9259°N 87.6498°W
- Owner: Audioleaf Lincoln Operating LLC (Michael Johnston, William Johnston)
- Capacity: 507
- Type: Music venue

Construction
- Opened: October 16, 2009

Website
- www.lh-st.com

Since 2009, the building has housed the Lincoln Hall bar and music venue. The capacity is 507, divided between the main floor and the balcony.

Brothers Chris and Mike Schuba started the Lincoln Hall venue. In 2009, the brothers were already operating their nearby music venue Schubas Tavern, where Dave Matthews, The Avett Brothers, Modest Mouse, Feist, and My Morning Jacket played shows early in their careers. The Schuba brothers intended Lincoln Hall to serve as a larger version of their other club, and opened it in 2009 with a performance by Mike Doughty. Lincoln Hall hosted monthly "3-Penny was here" film nights, at least through 2012. In 2015, the Schuba brothers sold both music clubs to Audiotree, which continues to operate them as a pair, as of 2021.
