= Irving Park station (CTA Brown Line) =

Chicago "L" station

Irving Park 4000N 1800W
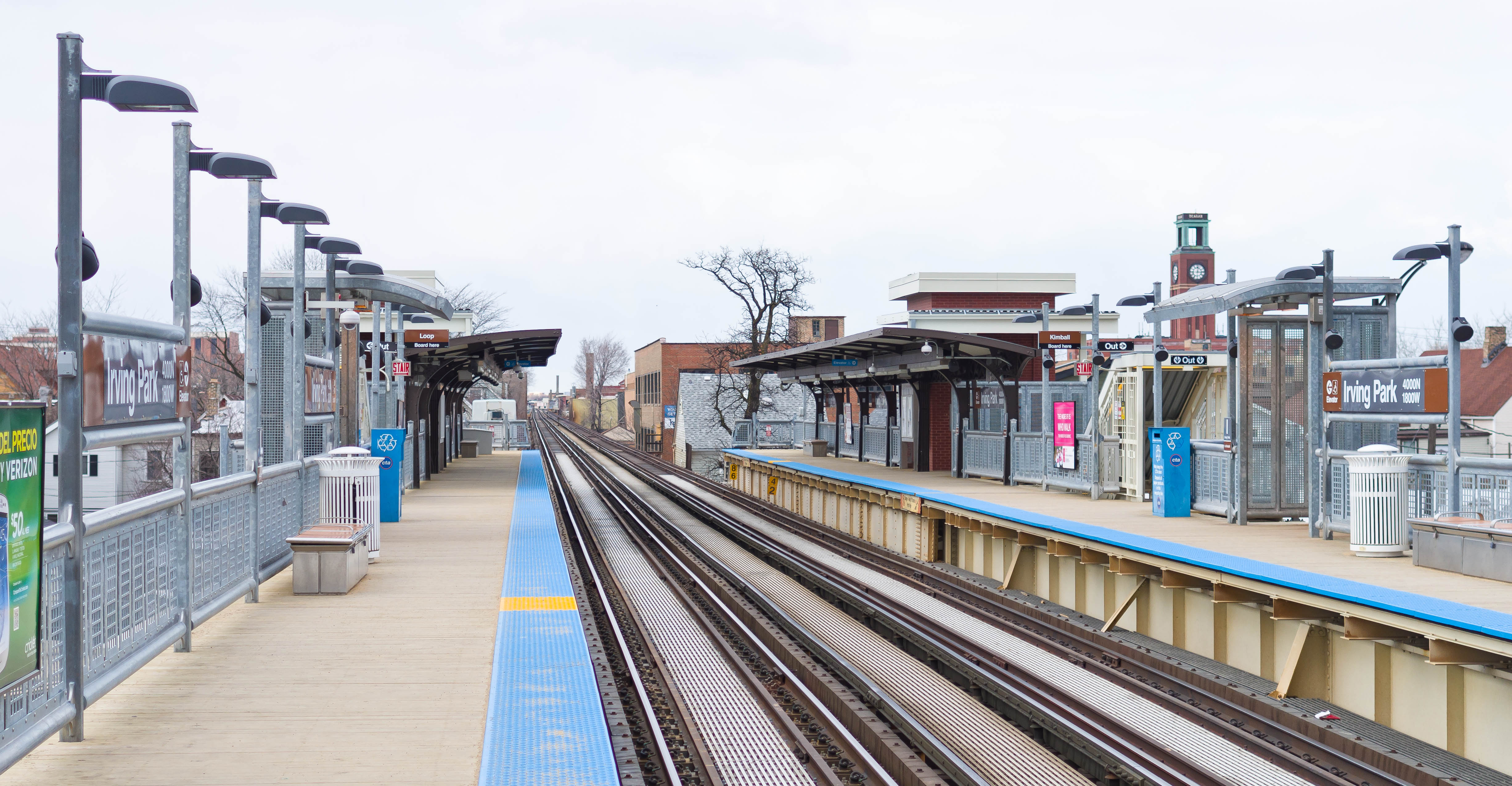

General information
- Location: 1816 West Irving Park Road; Chicago, Illinois 60613
- Coordinates: 41.954387°N 87.674956°W
- Owner: Chicago Transit Authority
- Line: Ravenswood branch
- Platforms: 2 side platforms
- Tracks: 2

Construction
- Structure type: Elevated
- Cycle facilities: Yes
- Accessible: Yes

History
- Opened: May 18, 1907; 119 years ago
- Rebuilt: 2007–2008; 18 years ago

Passengers
- 2025: 544,469 ▲7%

Services
Preceding station	Chicago "L"	Following station
Montrose toward Kimball	Brown Line	Addison toward Loop (Washington/Wells)
Track layout
Location

Irving Park is an 'L' station on the CTA's Brown Line. It is an elevated station with two side platforms, located in Chicago's North Center neighborhood. The stations adjacent to Irving Park are Montrose, one half mile (0.8 km) to the north, and Addison, one half mile (0.8 km) to the south.

== History ==
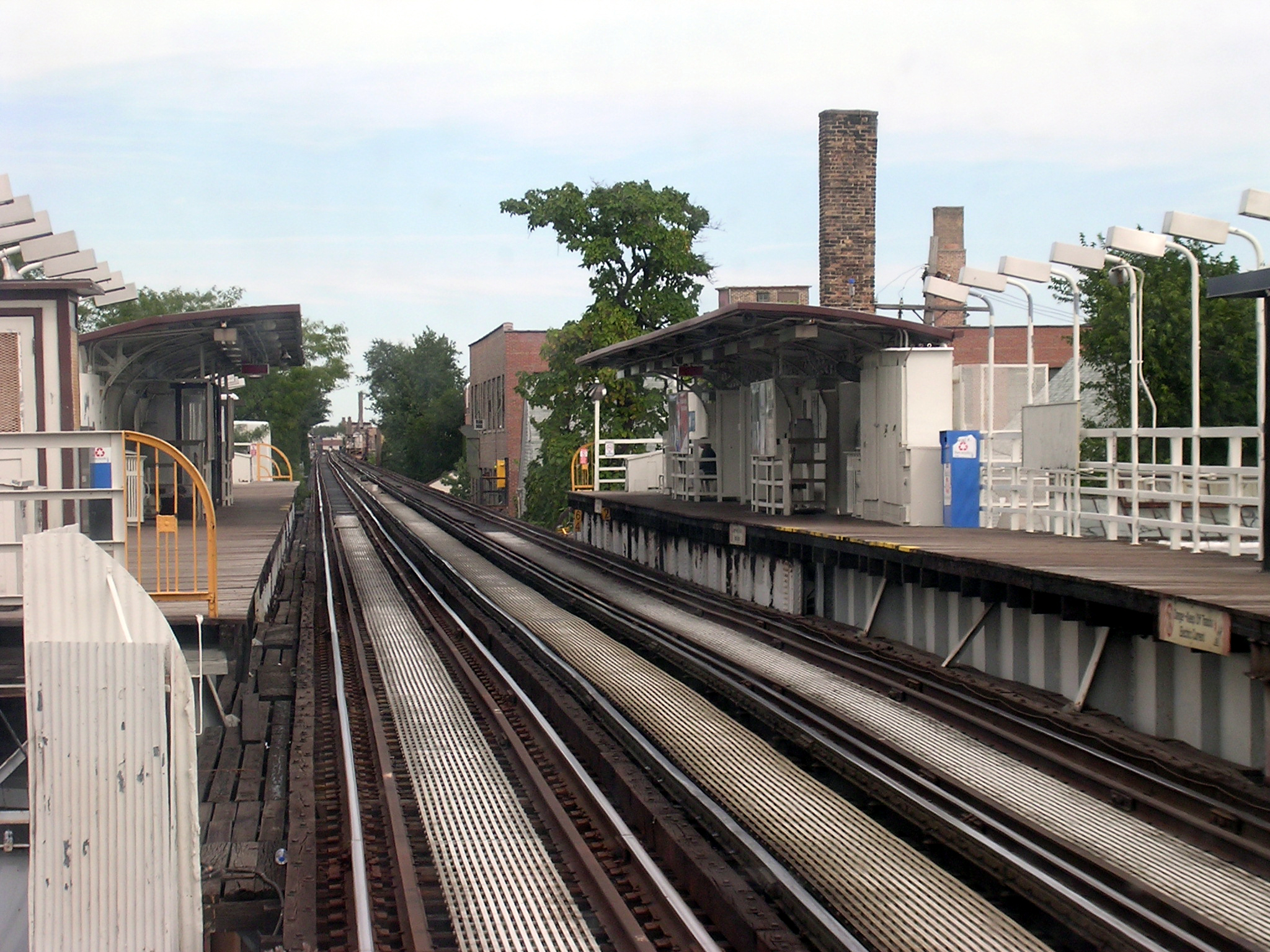
Irving Park before reconstruction, September 2005

Irving Park station opened in 1907 as part of the Northwestern Elevated Railroad's Ravenswood line. In CTA's skip-stop service on the Brown Line, instituted in 1949, Irving Park was an "AB" station.

In 2006, the CTA began the Brown Line Capacity Expansion Project, which involved the renovation and reconstruction of Brown Line stations to allow eight car trains to run on the line and make them accessible to passengers with disabilities. Irving Park station closed between December 3, 2007, and December 6, 2008, and was completely rebuilt.

== Bus connections ==
CTA

- 80 Irving Park
