= Western station (CTA Blue Line O'Hare branch) =

Chicago "L" station

Western 2400W 1900N
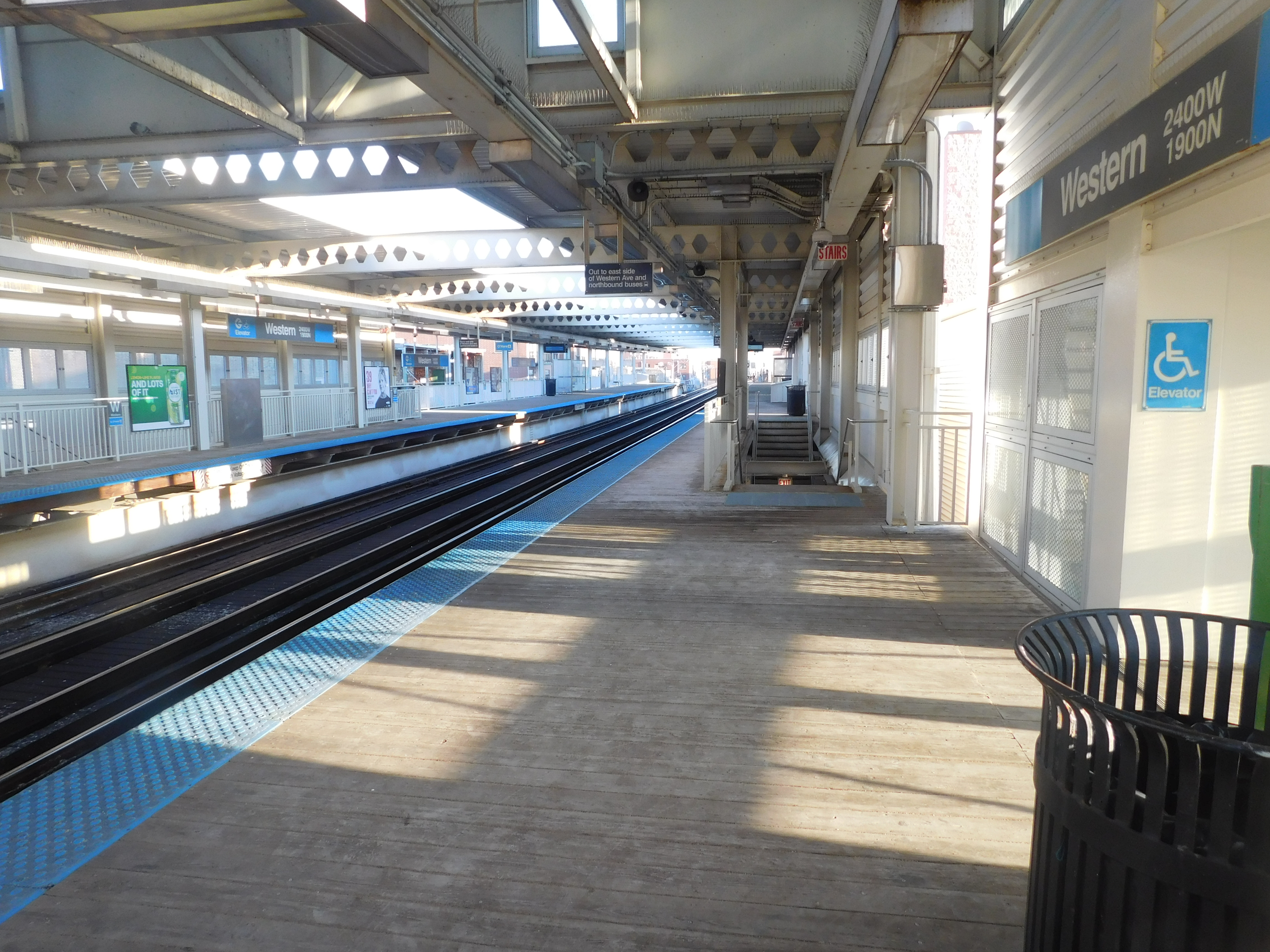

General information
- Location: 1909-11 North Western Avenue; Chicago, Illinois 60647
- Coordinates: 41°54′58″N 87°41′15″W
- Owner: Chicago Transit Authority
- Line: Logan Square Branch (O'Hare Branch)
- Platforms: 2 side platforms
- Tracks: 2

Construction
- Structure type: Elevated
- Accessible: Yes

History
- Opened: May 25, 1895; 131 years ago
- Rebuilt: 2000–2001; 25 years ago

Passengers
- 2025: 1,117,640 ▲11.3%

Services
Preceding station	Chicago "L"	Following station
California toward O'Hare	Blue Line	Damen toward Forest Park
Track layout
Location

Western is an elevated rapid transit station on the Chicago "L"'s Blue Line, where it is located on the O'Hare branch. The station, opened in 1895, is located within the Bucktown neighborhood in the larger Logan Square community area. It has two side platforms at track level with a station house at street level.

Western was constructed by the Metropolitan West Side Elevated Railroad to serve its Logan Square branch. The Metropolitan's operations, along with the rest of the "L", were assumed by the private Chicago Rapid Transit Company in 1924 and the public Chicago Transit Authority in 1948. The rail lines that had been constructed by the Metropolitan were significantly altered in the 1950s, a process that created the "West-Northwest Route" in 1958, which was renamed the Blue Line in 1992. After the West-Northwest Route was created, the Logan Square branch, renamed the "Milwaukee branch", was extended to O'Hare International Airport in 1984, becoming the O'Hare branch.

Western station itself was significantly rebuilt in 1930, and again in 2000–2001. Both reconstructions maintained substantial pieces of the station's historical fabric while introducing many new elements and modernizations.

== History ==
The Metropolitan West Side Elevated Railroad Company was granted a 50-year franchise by the Chicago City Council on April 7, 1892, and began securing right of way shortly thereafter. As designed, the Metropolitan's operations comprised a main line that went west from downtown to Marshfield, where three branches – one northwest to Logan Square, one due west to Garfield Park, and one southwest to Douglas Park – diverged and served various parts of Chicago's west side. A further branch to Humboldt Park proceeded due west from the Logan Square branch just past Robey Street. (Note: Technically, the Logan Square branch started after Robey and was, like the Humboldt Park branch, a divergence from what was formally known as the "Northwest branch". However, as early as 1898, even the Metropolitan itself was referring to the Northwest branch as part of the "Logan Square branch".) The Metropolitan began service at 6 a.m. on Monday, May 6, 1895, between Robey on the Logan Square branch and Canal on the main line. The Logan Square branch was extended to Logan Square on May 25, an extension that included a station on Western Avenue.

The Metropolitan's lines were originally operated by the West Side Construction Company, which had been responsible for constructing them, and would be transferred to the Metropolitan on October 6, 1896. The backers and officers of the two companies were largely identical, however, so this transfer of ownership was nominal. The expenses incurred in constructing the Metropolitan's vast trackage would come back to haunt the company, which entered receivership in 1897; the similarly-named Metropolitan West Side Elevated Railway Company was organized in January 1899 and assumed operations on February 3 of that year. The new Metropolitan, along with the other companies operating "L" lines in Chicago, became a part of the Chicago Elevated Railways (CER) trust on July 1, 1911. CER acted as a de facto holding company for the "L" – unifying its operations, instituting the same management across the companies, and instituting free transfers between the lines starting in 1913 – but kept the underlying companies intact. This continued until the companies were formally merged into the single Chicago Rapid Transit Company (CRT) in 1924, which assumed operations on January 9; the former Metropolitan was designated the Metropolitan division of the CRT for administrative purposes. Although municipal ownership of transit had been a hotly-contested issue for half a century, the publicly-owned Chicago Transit Authority (CTA) would not be created until 1945, or assume operation of the "L" until October 1, 1947.

The CTA instituted major changes on the lines built by the Metropolitan that had been planned since the late 1930s. The Logan Square branch south of Damen was replaced by the Milwaukee-Dearborn subway, which opened on February 25, 1951. With the subway's opening, the CTA restricted the Humboldt Park branch to a shuttle service to and from Damen, and closed it altogether on May 5, 1952. Combined with the replacement of the main line and Garfield Park branch with the Congress Line in 1958, this formed a new route called the "West-Northwest Route", which entered service on June 22, 1958. This route was renamed the Blue Line in 1992. Skip-stop, where certain "A" and "B" trains stopped at respective "A" and "B" stations, was instituted with the 1951 opening of the subway; Western was deemed a "B" station. The Logan Square branch, referred to by the CTA as the "Milwaukee branch" after the completion of the West-Northwest Route, was extended past Logan Square to Jefferson Park on February 1, 1970. Further extensions were made to River Road in 1983 and finally to O'Hare International Airport on September 3, 1984, forming the O'Hare branch.

=== Station reconstructions and renovations ===
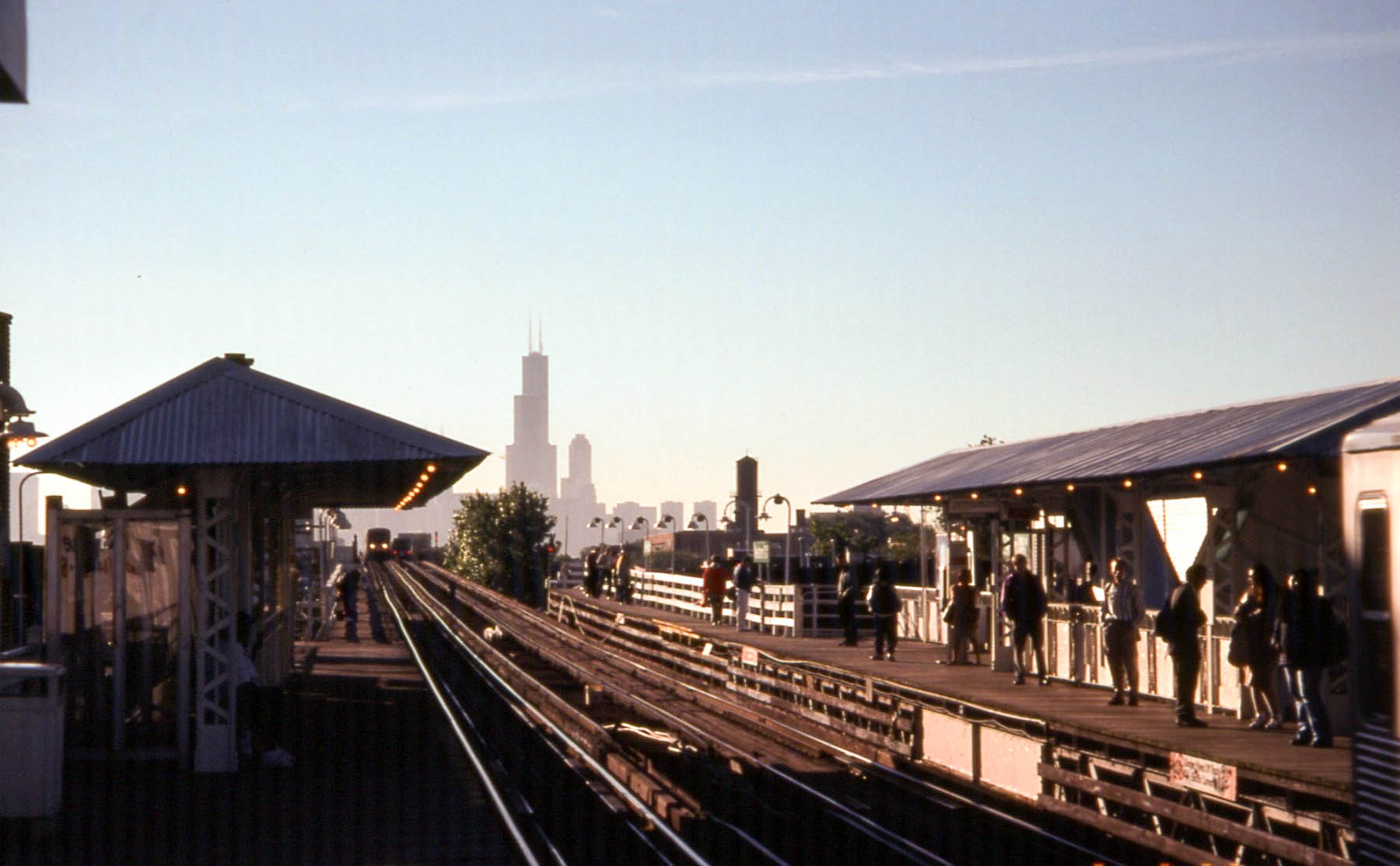
Western station in September 1997, prior to its reconstruction.

Western Avenue was widened in the early 1930s, removing the frontmost few feet from the station house and requiring a new facade for it. The new facade, designed by transit architect Arthur U. Gerber, is executed in an Art Deco style, with tan terra cotta tiles and green lettering reading "L - RAPID TRANSIT - L", and was complete by 1935.

By 1985, Western and its adjacent stations were singled out for being among the "L" stations in the worst repair. The CTA began plans to overhaul the station and expected to finish the renovation by 1988. Nothing came of these plans, although renderings were ready by the early 1990s. The CTA again announced in September 1999, that work would be done to the station, which started in June 2000 and was completed by September 2001, before ending in November 2001. The Art Deco facade, which was eligible for the National Register of Historic Places, and original 1895 northern wall were preserved, but the rest of the station house was demolished, as were the platforms and their canopies. Wider wooden platforms were constructed, and a new canopy was constructed that spans the whole length and width of both platforms, with skylights down the center above the tracks. The new station house interior was more spacious and faced a plaza to the station house's south, and contained elevators making the station accessible to passengers with disabilities.

Mayor Rahm Emanuel and Governor Pat Quinn announced on December 5, 2013, a $429 million comprehensive improvement plan called "Your New Blue" for the O'Hare branch and Dearborn Street Subway, both a part of the Blue Line. The improvements to Western as a part of Your New Blue include a public art installation, called "Remnants | Restos", upgrading the station house, installing secure bicycle storage, a sidewalk canopy, LEDs for the historic façade, and replacement of the roofing, handrails, and guardrails on the north and south stairs.

== Station details ==
=== Infrastructure and facilities ===
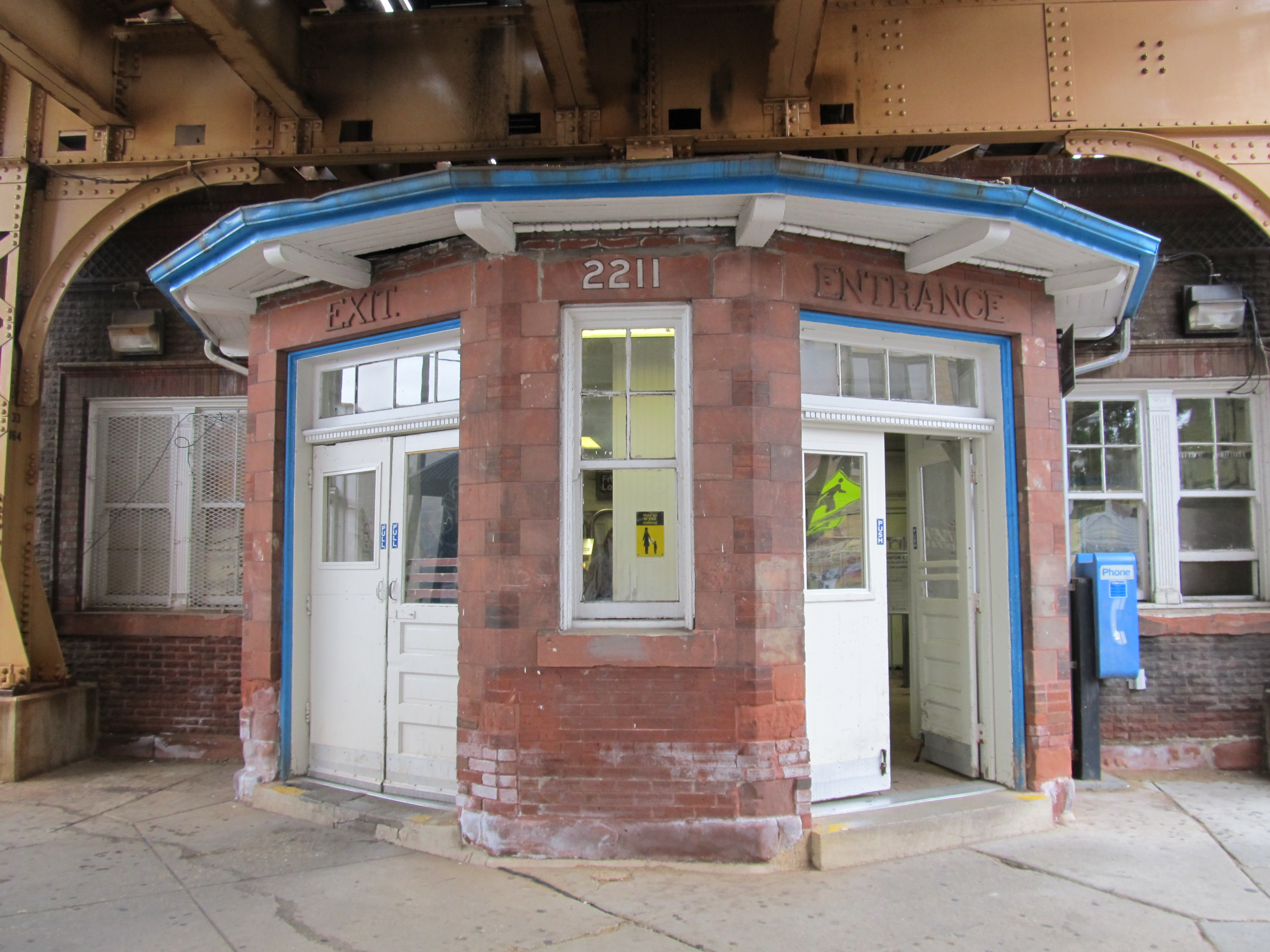
California's station house in 2011. Western's station house was of a similar design prior to the 1930s.

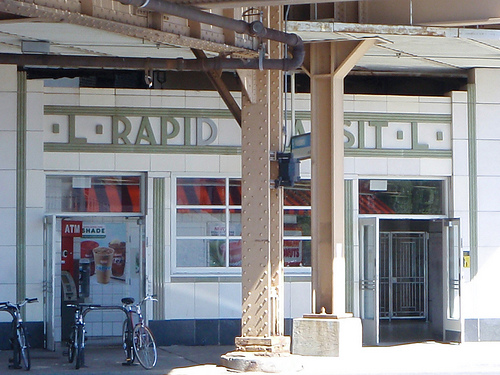
Western station house in 2009

The station house is Art Deco, as it has been since the 1930s.

=== Operations ===
The fare across the "L" was legally mandated to be a nickel (5 cents, $1.37 in 2021) in the late 19th and early 20th centuries. The nickel fare continued until temporarily increased by a cent to 6 cents in 1917 ($1.27 in 2021) before stabilizing to a dime in 1920 (10 cents, $1.35 in 2021). Starting in 1922, fares were usually marketed in packs of three rides for 25 cents, or 8 1/3 cents per ride ($1.35 per ride in 2021), but individual fares remained 10 cents each. At the same time, a weekly pass was introduced, the first in a major American city, for $1.25 ($20.24 in 2021) for rides outside of Evanston and Wilmette. As of 2022, the full fare for the "L" is $2.25, with a reduced fare of $1.25 and a student fare of 75 cents; passes are available, including a 7-day pass worth $20 and a 30-day pass worth $75.

Unlike other elevated railroads at the time, the Metropolitan did not sell tickets for passengers to present to staff; instead customers gave their nickel to the station agent to record in a registry, a practice similar to streetcars at the time. This practice was ultimately adopted by the other elevateds. Originally, station agents were on duty 24 hours a day; conductors were used on the Logan Square, Humboldt Park, and Northwest branches to instead collect fares on trains during night and off-peak hours from 1931 through 1937, except for the Northwest branch in 1935. They returned to the Milwaukee branch in 1950, and continued in use until 1995.

Unlike the competing Lake Street Elevated, which provided smoking cars some but not all of the time, all of the Metropolitan's motor cars originally allowed smoking. Smoking was banned by the city across "L" facilities and in streetcars in response to a 1918 influenza outbreak, a prohibition that has remained in force ever since.

=== Connections ===
Streetcars replaced cable cars on Milwaukee Avenue between Lawrence and downtown on August 19, 1906. An extension route from Lawrence to Imlay, near the Forest Preserve, opened on December 11, 1914, and the lines were through-routed on October 1, 1927. Streetcars were typically one car each in Chicago; two-car multiple-unit control trains ran on Milwaukee Avenue between March 2, 1925 and May 5, 1929. As of 1928, the line had owl service between 1:05 and 5:35 a.m., wherein cars to Devon Avenue ran every 15 minutes and cars to Gale Street ran every 30 minutes; during the day, streetcars in Chicago typically had intervals of eight to fifteen minutes. Buses replaced streetcars on weekends on October 28, 1951, and altogether on May 11, 1952.

A streetcar line on Western Avenue was through-routed between Roscoe and 71st Street on September 5, 1911. This route was extended north to Lawrence Avenue on October 28, 1912, and consolidated with another route to the north to form a through-route to Howard Avenue on May 1, 1923, which was termed "Through Route 10" (TR 10) in 1924. As of 1928, TR 10 had owl service between 1 and 4:30 a.m., wherein a car ran every thirty minutes. Southward extension through the 1920s and early 1930s brought TR 10 to 111th Street on November 8, 1931. Buses replaced streetcars on the outlying portions of the route on August 1, 1948, during weekends on the central portion of the route on December 7, 1952, and altogether on June 17, 1956; however, the central route and the two outlying routes separated by the incremental introduction of buses were not reunited. Streetcars were two-man on Western before June 19, 1955, and one-man afterwards.

Another streetcar route, on Armitage Avenue, also served the station. Before 1906, this was a shuttle to Milwaukee Avenue, but became a through-route between Kostner Street and Milwaukee to downtown. The route was extended west to Cicero Avenue in 1912, and a further western extension to Grand Avenue took place on August 15, 1914. Another route on Armitage, going east of the Chicago River and starting from Campbell near the station, began service on June 19, 1914. One-man cars began on the east route on April 1, 1923, and east route service also extended to Grand Avenue on February 2, 1925. The west route was considered a branch of the Milwaukee Avenue route, using the same cars, crews, barns, and transfers as the route. As of 1928, the east route had owl service between 1:08 and 5 a.m., with a car running every fifteen minutes, whereas the west route did not have owl service, the last westbound car leaving downtown at 12:50 a.m. and night service being covered by the east route. Downtown service for west route cars was discontinued on Sundays on May 1, 1932, to save costs. Buses replaced streetcars east of the River on February 26, 1951, and altogether on June 24, 1951.

== Bus connections ==
CTA

- 49 Western (Owl Service)
- X49 Western Express (weekday rush hours only)
- 56 Milwaukee
- 73 Armitage

== Works cited ==
- Borzo, Greg (2007). The Chicago "L". Charleston, South Carolina: Arcadia. ISBN 9780738551005 – via Google Books.
- Public Information Department (1967). Congress Rapid Transit. Chicago: Chicago Transit Authority – via Internet Archive.
- CTA Rail Entrance, Annual Traffic, 1900–1979 (Report). Chicago: Chicago Transit Authority. October 1, 1979.
- Lind, Alan R. (1974). Chicago Surface Lines: An Illustrated History. Park Forest, Illinois: Transport History Press.
- Moffat, Bruce G. (1995). The "L": The Development of Chicago's Rapid Transit System, 1888–1932. Chicago: Central Electric Railfans' Association. ISBN 0-915348-30-6.
- "The Metropolitan West Side Elevated Railroad of Chicago". The Street Railway Review. 5: 263–274. January 15, 1895.
