= Pueblito Viejo =

Pueblito Viejo #1
- Interactive map of Pueblito Viejo #1

Restaurant information
- Established: 1994
- Owner: Gonzalo Rodriguez
- Food type: Colombian cuisine
- Location: 5429 North Lincoln Ave., Chicago, Illinois, 60625, United States
- Coordinates: 41°58′49.5″N 87°41′33.0″W
- Seating capacity: 120
- Other information: Phone: 1.773.784.9135
- Website: PueblitoViejo.com

Pueblito Viejo is a pair of Colombian restaurants in Chicago, Illinois and Miami, Florida.

== Pueblito Viejo #1 (Chicago) ==
The Chicago location, Pueblito Viejo #1, is owned by Colombian native Gonzalo Rodriguez. It opened in October 1994 and is located at 5429 N. Lincoln Avenue in Chicago's Ravenswood neighborhood. The popular restaurant is known for its extensive decor and its large dance floor, filled with dancers enjoying a DJ's salsa, cumbia, merengue, bachata, and other Latin music until 2AM Sunday, Wednesday-Friday or 3AM Saturday nights. The Chicago Reader wrote of the decor, "artificial trees, vines, fruits, and flowers and dozens of baskets fill just about every inch of wall space at this cavernous Colombian restaurant and bar," concluding it was, "over the top." The name comes from the popular Colombian folk song "Pueblito Viejo" (English: "Old Village").

Pueblito Viejo serves hearty, authentic Colombian foods including arepa, empanada, seafood, and pechuga de pollo. Bilingual waitstaff wear traditional Colombian outfits, including wide brimmed hats for the male servers. A full-service bar serves Grupo Modelo beers such as Corona, Modelo, and Victoria as well as liquors, including authentic Andean aguardiente and Latin-themed mixed drinks like mojito and margarita.

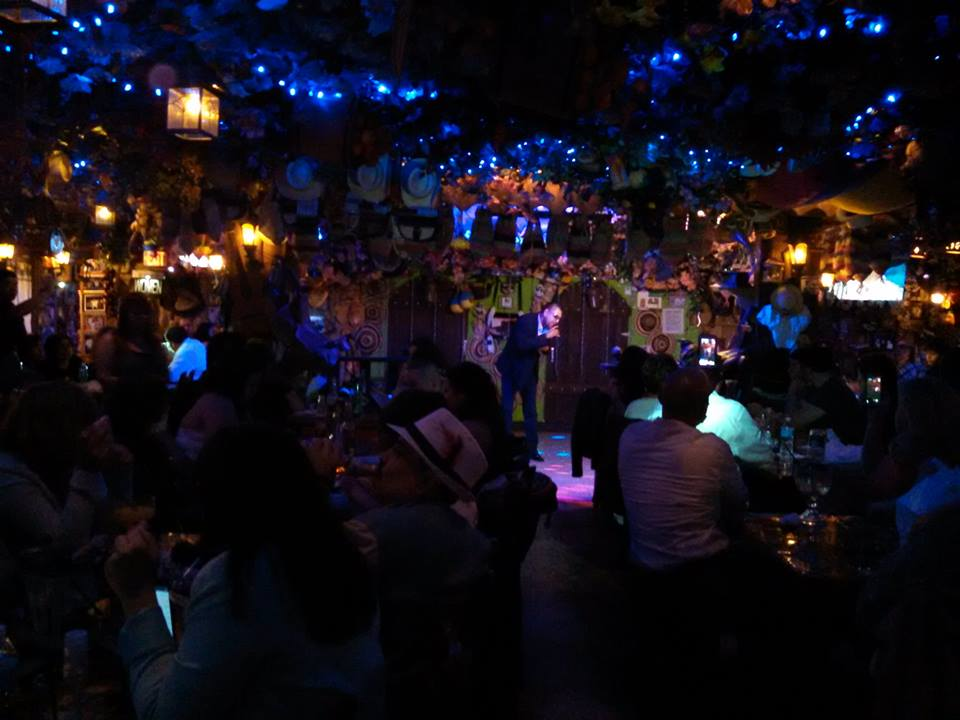

Pueblito Viejo #2
- Interactive map of Pueblito Viejo #2

Restaurant information
- Established: 2003
- Food type: Colombian cuisine
- Location: 8285 SW 40th Street, Miami, Florida, 33155, United States
- Seating capacity: 230
- Website: PueblitoViejo.com

== Pueblito Viejo #2 (Miami) ==
Pueblito Viejo #2 opened on January 27, 2003. The Florida restaurant has a larger capacity of 230 people and served 75,000 people in its first year of operation. Like the Chicago location, the Miami Pueblito Viejo features Latin music and a full-service bar. Live entertainment is available on weekends. It is a popular gathering spot for Florida's Colombian-American community, the nation's largest, and experienced crowds during Colombia's 2014 World Cup run.

=== Juanes appearance ===
Colombian rock star Juanes, winner of 19 Latin Grammys, performed an impromptu, acoustic performance at Pueblito Viejo #2 in June 2014. He performed his hit "Una Flor".

=== Rick Scott campaign stop ===
In the home stretch of a toss-up reelection campaign, Florida Governor Rick Scott gave a campaign speech there to 100 invited guests. He launched the first minute of his discussion about jobs in heavily accented Spanish. Lieutenant Governor Carlos Lopez-Cantera appeared with Governor Scott at the Pueblito rally.

=== Rachel Russell and Style Saves ===
Miami style "it-girl" personality Rachael Russell started a South Florida charity Style Saves to donate stylish clothing to disadvantaged. Pueblito Viejo #2 donated empanadas and other food for the not-for-profit's fundraiser.
