= Krause Music Store =

- U.S. National Register of Historic Places
- Chicago Landmark
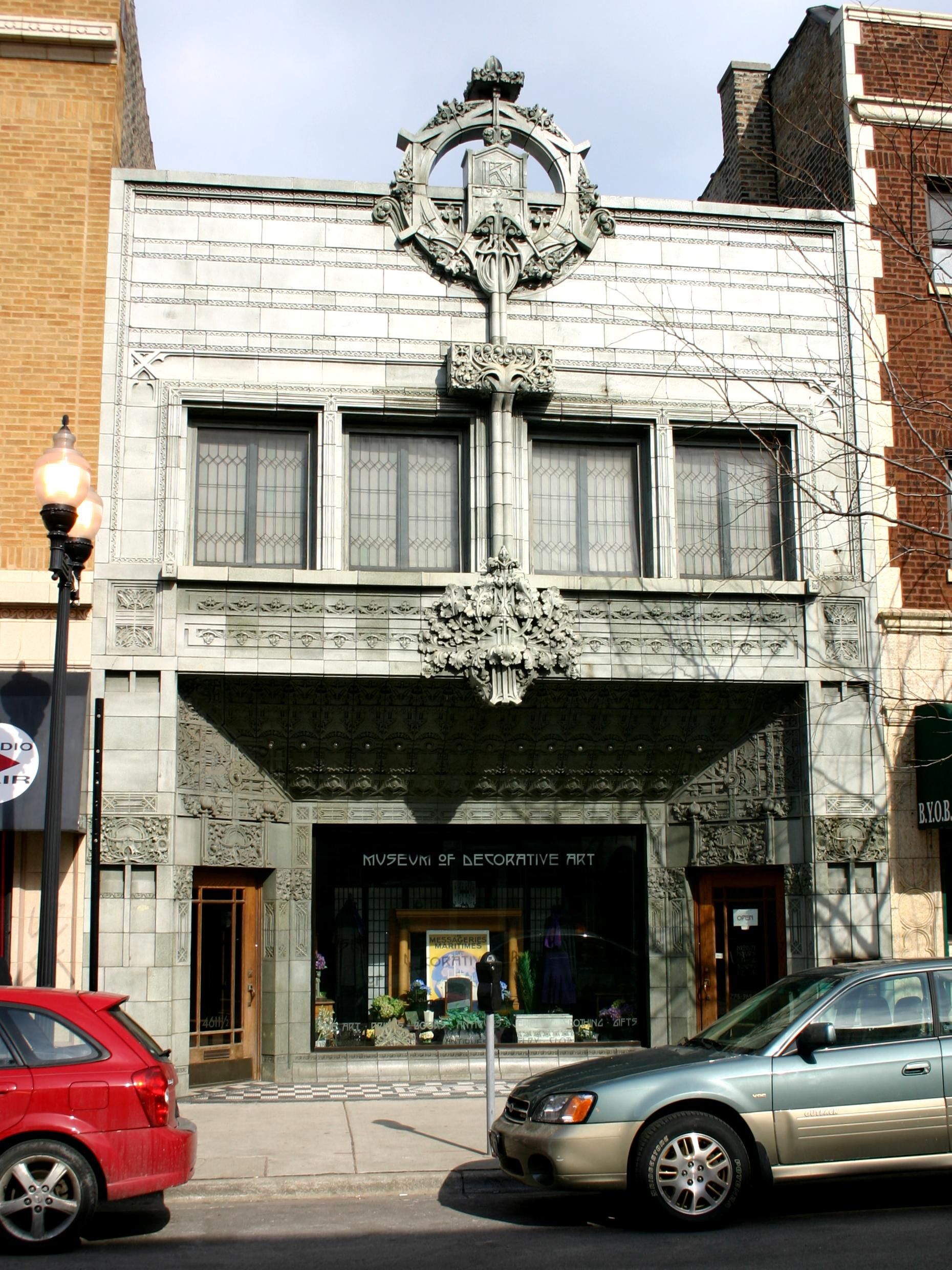
- Location: 4611 North Lincoln Avenue; Chicago, Illinois, U.S.
- Coordinates: 41°57′55″N 87°41′10″W
- Built: 1922
- Architect: William Presto (store); Louis Sullivan (facade)
- NRHP reference No.: 06000452

Significant dates
- Added to NRHP: May 31, 2006
- Designated CHICL: September 28, 1977

The Krause Music Store is a commercial building at 4611 North Lincoln Avenue in Chicago, Illinois, United States. Constructed in 1922, it is the last of the 126 buildings designed by Louis Sullivan.

With its curvilinear plant-like forms and intricate framing of the picture window, the façade of this building is an outgrowth of Sullivan's belief in organic architecture. It was commissioned in 1921 by William P. Krause to serve the dual purpose of a residence and a music shop, at a total cost of $22,000. Krause chose his neighbor, architect William Presto, to design the building (years earlier, Presto had worked as a draftsman for Louis Sullivan). Sullivan was asked by his former employee to design what would become the building's green terra cotta façade. Sullivan, in ill health, living in a rented room, and insolvent, accepted the offer. Showcasing his expertise with terra cotta, Sullivan designed the ornamentation of the entire façade with geometric and curvilinear forms of nature. The material for the façade was furnished by the American Terra Cotta Company for $3,770.

The building was completed in 1922. The store opened to sell pianos and sheet music and was a pioneering retailer for the introduction of the radio. With the onset of the Great Depression, William Krause committed suicide in the family's apartment on the second floor. His widow rented and eventually sold the building to a funeral parlor. During the next 60 years, the building functioned as a funeral home, undergoing many alterations. The terra cotta façade was acid washed, which ultimately damaged and lightened its color. The basement was converted into a workspace for embalming the dead.

On September 20, 1977, the City of Chicago recognized the historic significance of the building and designated the façade as a Chicago Landmark. Thirteen years later, Scott Elliott opened Klemscott Galleries and restored the front of the building. By the turn of the new century, a gift shop called The Museum of Decorative Arts occupied the space.

In May 2005, the building was purchased by Pooja and Peter Vukosavich, who painstakingly restored the historic Sullivan façade and completed a modern renovation of the main floor for their company offices, Studio V Design – a marketing communications and design agency. The renovation has won several awards (including the Driehaus Foundation Award and the AIA award). In 2006, through the efforts of Peter and Pooja Vukosavich, the building was placed in the National Register of Historic Places. The Vukosaviches closed Studio V Design and put the building up for sale in 2019, where it remained on the market for a long time due to the 2020 COVID-19 pandemic. The building is currently occupied as of May 2025 by biotechnology company Briteseed.

== History ==
William P. Krause hired architect William Presto to design a music store with an apartment above. Presto in turn commissioned Sullivan to design the façade. The building was completed in 1922.

It was registered as a Chicago Landmark by the City of Chicago in 1977.

From roughly 1929, after Krause closed the music store, it was rented and operated as a Funeral Home.

In 2006, the building was purchased by Studio V Design, who had the façade restored and the interior renovated.
