= Julia C. Lathrop Homes =

Public housing development in Chicago, Illinois, United States

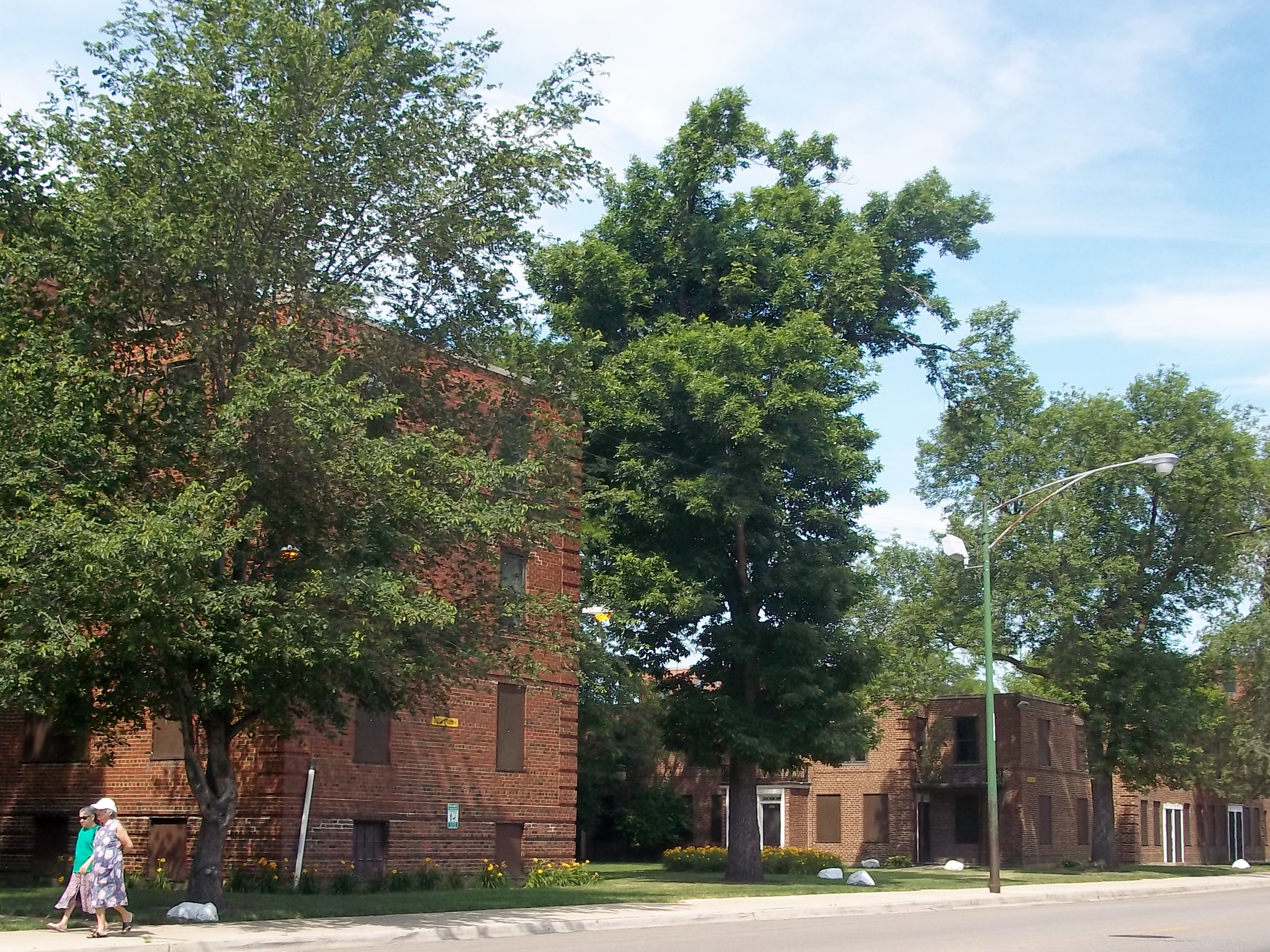
- 2012 photograph of the Lathrop Homes housing project facing North Clybourn Avenue.
- Interactive map of Julia C. Lathrop Homes

General information
- Location: Bordered by North Clybourn Ave, North Damen Ave, North Leavitt St. & The Chicago River; Chicago, Illinois, United States
- Coordinates: 41.9322°N 87.6797°W
- Status: Under Renovation

Construction
- Constructed: 1937–38

Other information
- Governing body: Chicago Housing Authority
- Julia C. Lathrop Homes
- U.S. National Register of Historic Places
- U.S. Historic district
- Location: Bounded by N. Clybourn Ave., N. Damen Ave., N. Leavitt St. & the Chicago River; Chicago, Illinois
- NRHP reference No.: 12000025
- Added to NRHP: February 21, 2012

Julia C. Lathrop Homes is a Chicago Housing Authority (CHA) public housing project located along the line between the Lincoln Park and North Center neighborhoods on the north side of Chicago, Illinois, United States. It is bordered by the neighborhoods of Bucktown and Roscoe Village. Completed in 1938 by the Public Works Administration, Lathrop Homes was one of the first Chicago public housing projects. Lathrop Homes was placed on the National Register of Historic Places in 2012 and is currently undergoing restoration. Lathrop Homes consists of two-story brick row houses and three- and four-story apartment buildings separated by landscaped courtyards and linked by small archways in a campus-like arrangement. There are a total of 925 units on 35.5 acres of land (approximately three and a half square blocks).

== History ==
Named for social reformer Julia Clifford Lathrop, Lathrop Homes was one of the city's first public housing projects. The homes were built by the Public Works Administration in 1938 and initially leased to the Chicago Housing Authority. The buildings were designed in a Prairie School, Arts and Crafts style with details in a range of styles from Art Moderne to Colonial Revival. The designers were a "dream team" led by Robert S. De Golyer and also including Hugh M.G. Garden, Thomas E. Tallmadge, Vernon Watson, E.E. Roberts, Charles White and Hubert Burnham, with landscaping by Jens Jensen. In 1959, the authority added an 8-story building to house seniors to the south side of the project.

In keeping with the federal neighborhood segregation policy of the time, the development was intended for whites only. As the development matured, it became racially integrated, and has been called "the city's most diverse public housing neighborhood".

== Crime and gangs ==
In recent decades, the Julia C. Lathrop homes have been subject to many of the same problems of increasing crime as other housing projects in Chicago, including narcotics trafficking and gang activity. The housing project was dominated by the Latin Kings street gang.

== Proposed redevelopment ==
In July 2006, the Chicago Housing Authority announced its intention to demolish the Lathrop Homes and redevelop the site. Residents and preservationists protested and Landmarks Illinois developed a plan to renovate the complex as affordable "green" housing. In early 2011, the authority cleared residents from the north end of the development; in November 2011, it awarded the redevelopment contract for the site to a team with experience in architectural preservation and sustainability. In October 2012, the Chicago Housing Authority approved the demolition of 1800 units including some from Lathrop Homes; however, how many of those demolitions relate to Lathrop Homes and when demolition would begin was not announced.

== National Register of Historic Places ==
In 1994, the Illinois Historic Preservation Agency and the National Park Service determined the Julia C. Lathrop Homes to be eligible for listing on the National Register of Historic Places. In December 2010, the Illinois Historic Sites Advisory Council advised that it be listed. It was listed on the National Register February 21, 2012.
