= Lincoln Avenue =

Street in Chicago

Coordinates: 41°55′38.8″N 87°39′5.6″W

- Little Fort Road
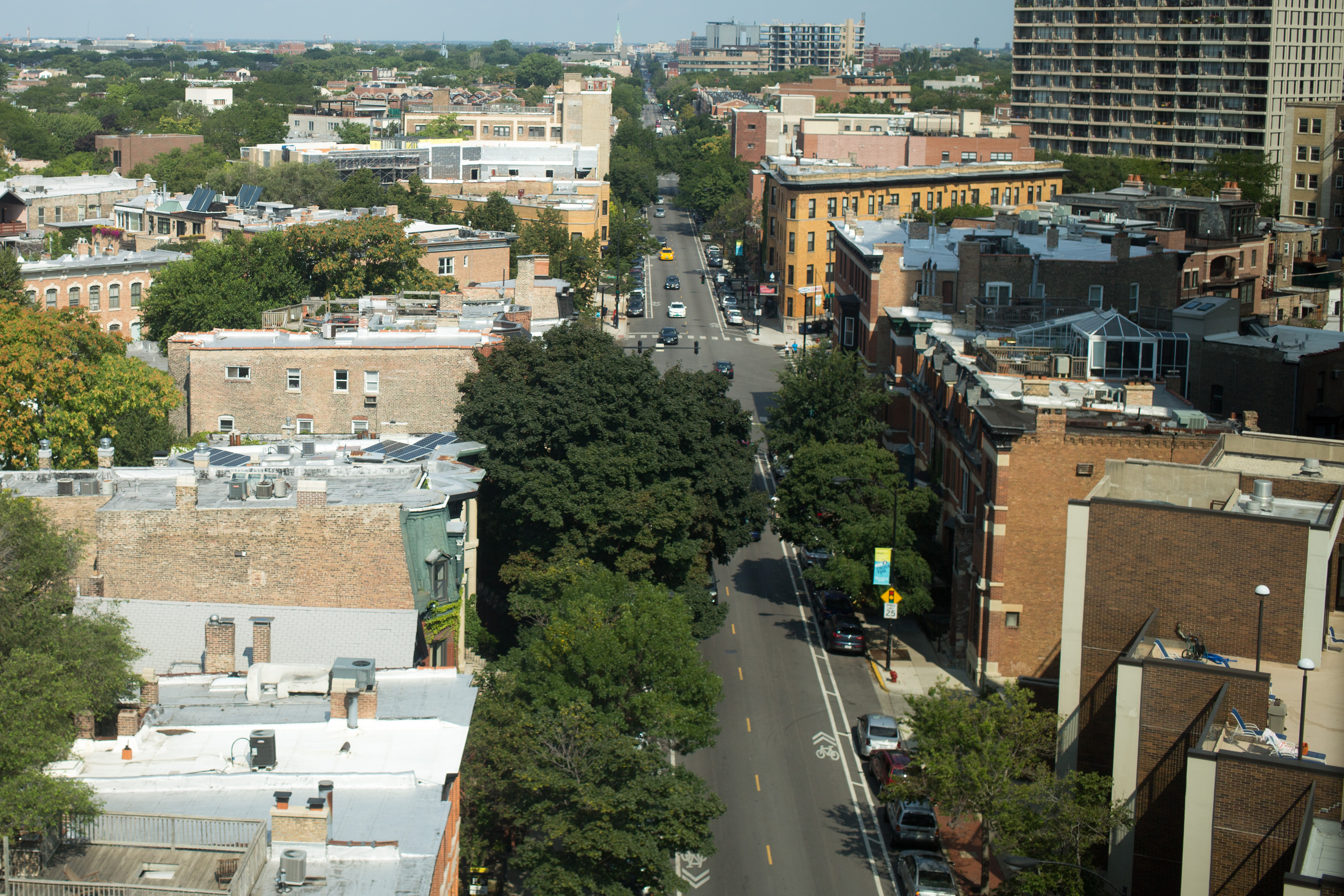
- Lincoln Avenue near Clark Street
- Interactive map of Lincoln Avenue
- Part of: US 41
- Length: 13 mi (21 km)
- Location: Chicago
- South end: Clark Street (1800 N/164 W) in Chicago
- North end: IL 58 / Dempster Street (8800 N/6450 W) in Morton Grove

Lincoln Avenue is a street of the north side of city of Chicago. It runs from Clark Street (itself a diagonal) on the western border of Lincoln Park largely to the northwest, ending in Morton Grove, Illinois. It leaves the city limits of Chicago at Devon Avenue, through the village of Lincolnwood, curves through the village of Skokie and ends at Dempster Street in Morton Grove. In total distance it is about 13 miles (21 km) long, although it is not completely continuous. Between Foster Avenue and Skokie Boulevard U.S. Route 41 runs on Lincoln Avenue.

Most of Lincoln Avenue is zoned commercial, and is lined by shops, restaurants and other establishments. It is the site of the yearly Taste of Lincoln Avenue, held between Fullerton Avenue and Wrightwood Avenue. It is also the site of the Maifest and German American Fest in Lincoln Square.

== History ==
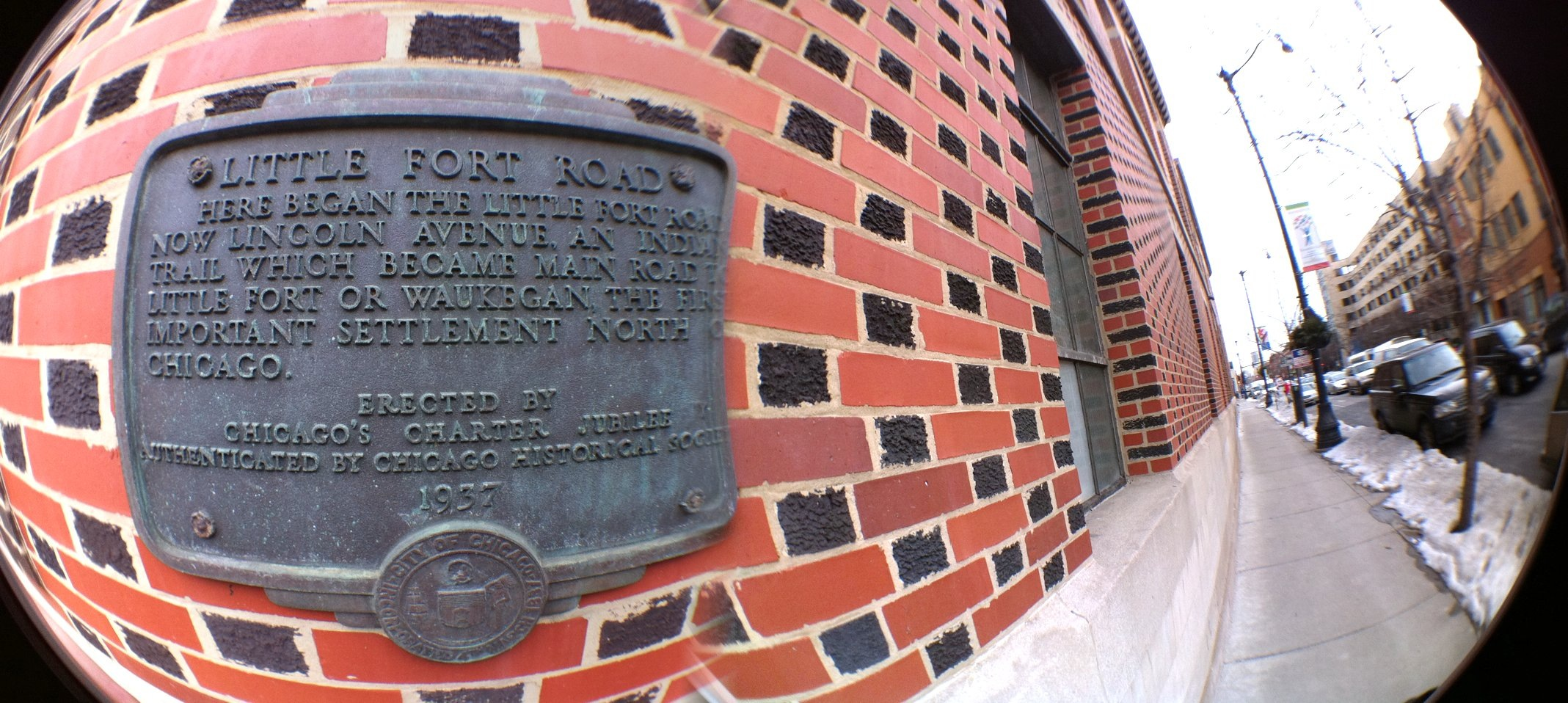
Lincoln Avenue was once an Indian trail called Little Fort Road

Originally it was a Native American trail running along a slight ridge in the usually soggy ground of pre-settlement Chicago. Prior to the assassination of Abraham Lincoln, the street was known as Little Fort Road, and it led to the town of Little Fort, now known as Waukegan, Illinois. In Morton Grove it was known as Miller's Mill Road.

== Transportation ==
Lincoln Avenue hosts a few CTA bus routes and one Pace bus route.

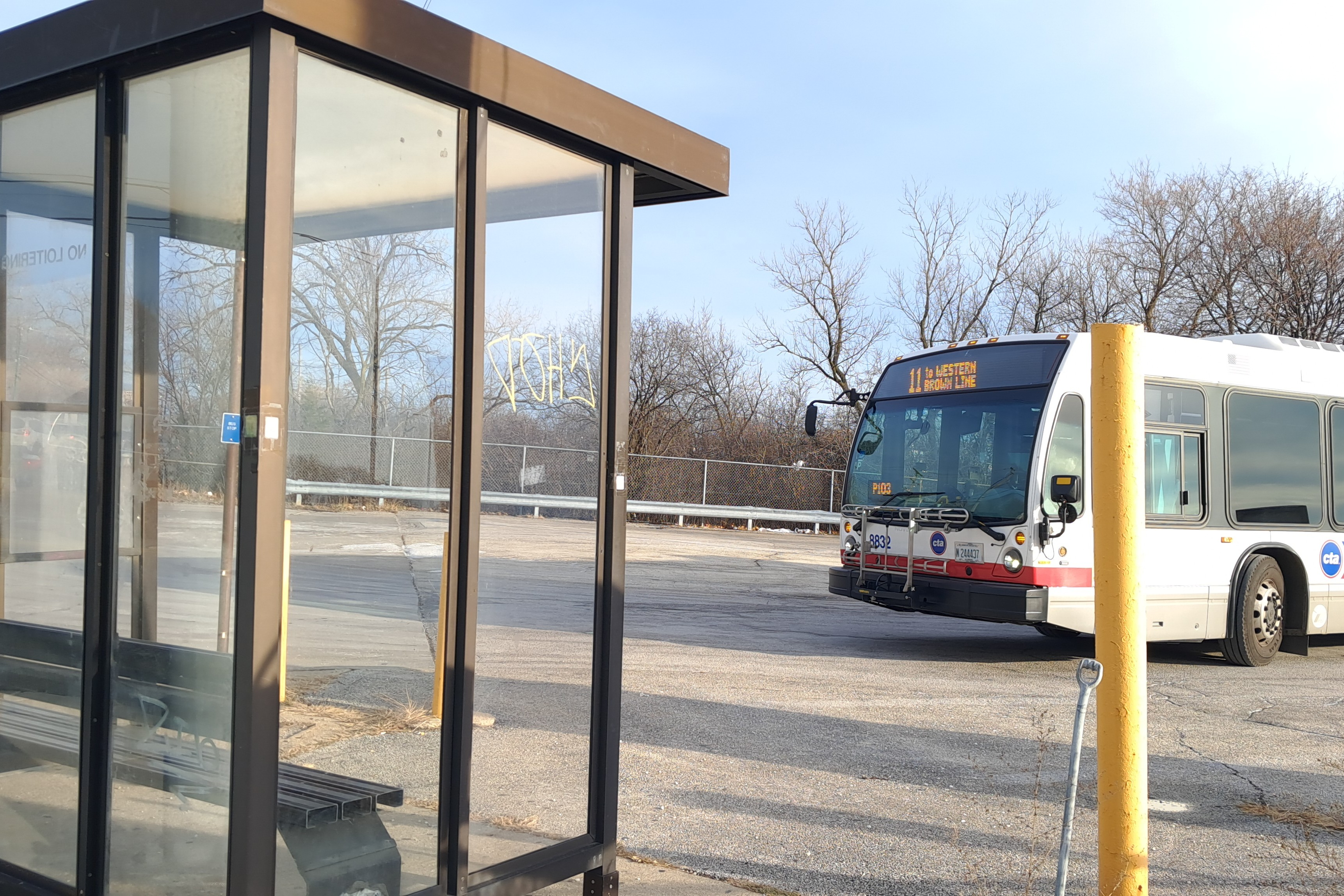
Route 11 bus at a bus turnaround

11 Lincoln is a CTA bus route that primarily travels along Lincoln Avenue as well as Kedzie Avenue, running from Western station on the Brown Line to a bus turnaround adjacent to the North Shore Channel Trail at Howard Street/McCormick Boulevard. Two other CTA routes, 74 Fullerton and 37 Sedgwick, partly run along Lincoln Avenue in order to travel in the opposite direction after reaching their destination.

210 Lincoln Avenue is a Pace bus route that also travels along Lincoln Avenue along with other roads, running from Lincolnwood Town Center to Glenbrook Hospital.

Lincoln Avenue is serviced by several train stations on the Brown Line: Paulina station, Addison station and Western station. The street also serves Morton Grove station on Metra's Milwaukee District North Line.

=== History ===
Prior to late 2012, bus route 11, then called 11 Lincoln/Sedgwick, traveled well beyond today's southern terminus toward downtown and Clinton station via Lincoln Avenue and Sedgwick Street. The southern section of the bus route along Sedgwick Street was split into the current 37 Sedgwick. The rest of the section south of Western station was discontinued, because it largely paralleled the Brown Line and received low ridership. Residents around the discontinued alignment criticized the service cut as detrimental to businesses and commuters.

In November 2015, in response to neighborhood pressure, the CTA announced the re-extension of bus route 11 to Fullerton station. Bus operation along this portion of Lincoln Avenue was reinstated in June 2016 but as a 6-month pilot program. Six months later, in December 2016, the CTA extended the program for another six months. The pilot program concluded on September 1, 2017, with bus route 11 being truncated back to Western station.

== Major intersections ==
The entire route is in Cook County.

Location	mi	km	Destinations	Notes
Chicago	0.0	0.0	N Clark Street	Southern terminus
Chicago	3.6	5.8	IL 19 (West Irving Park Road)	
Chicago	5.3	8.5	US 41 south (West Foster Avenue)	Southern end of US 41 concurrency
Chicago	6.7	10.8	US 14 (West Peterson Avenue)	
Skokie	9.5	15.3	US 41 north (Skokie Boulevard) / IL 50 south (Cicero Avenue)	Northern end of US 41 concurrency
Morton Grove	12.6	20.3	IL 58 (Dempster Street)	Northern terminus
1.000 mi = 1.609 km; 1.000 km = 0.621 mi: Concurrency terminus

== Notable establishments ==
- Biograph Theater
- Davis Theater
- Three Penny Cinema
- Krause Music Store
- Old Town School of Folk Music
- Pueblito Viejo
