= Addison Street =

Street on the north side of Chicago, Illinois, US

- Thomas Addison Street; 3600 North
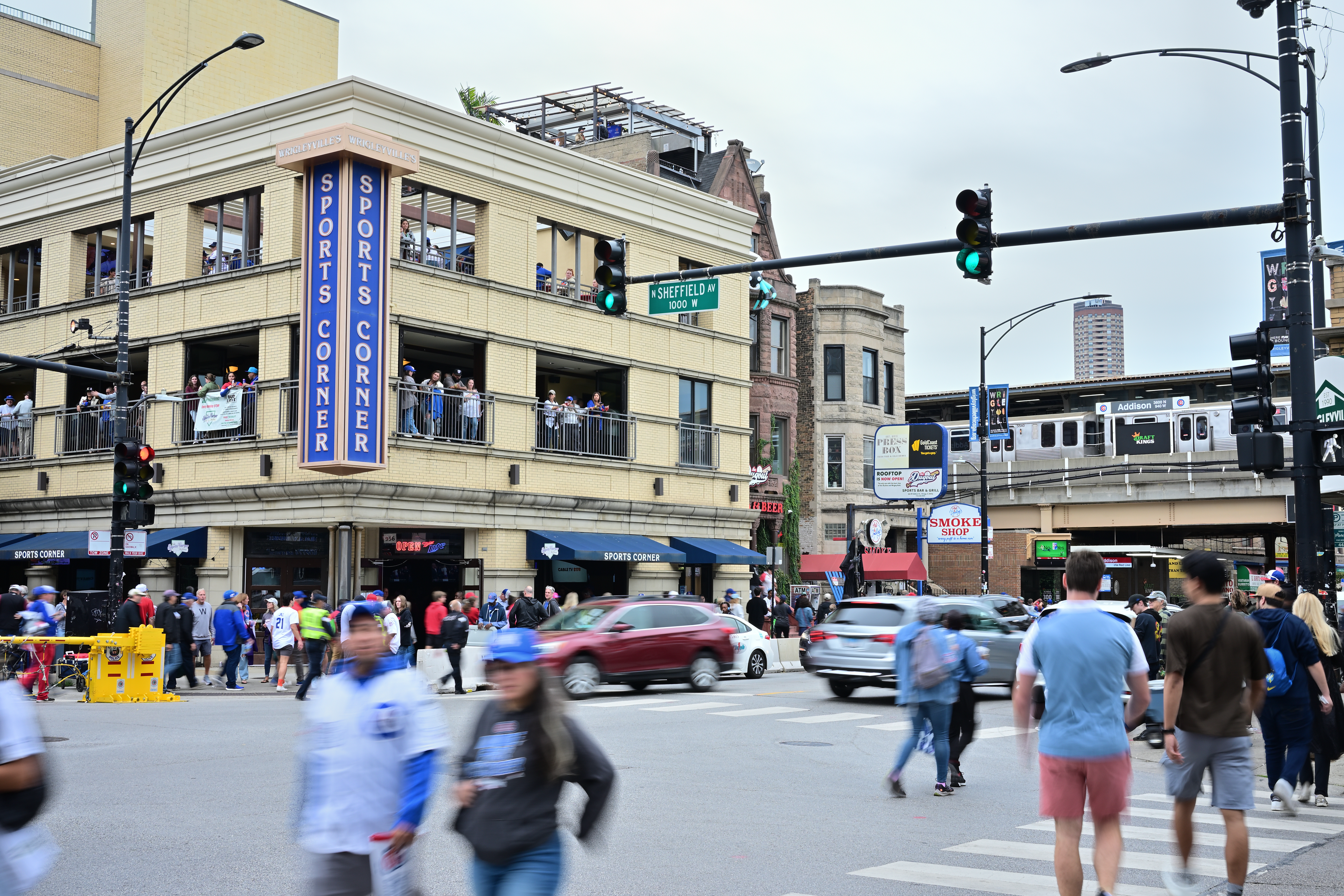
- Addison Street at Sheffield Avenue near Wrigley Field
- Interactive map of Addison Street
- West end: Dead end west of Runge Street in Franklin Park
- East end: US 41 (Lake Shore Drive) in Chicago

Addison Street is a major east–west street on the north side of Chicago and its western suburbs. Wrigley Field is located at 1060 West Addison Street, which is the home of the Chicago Cubs.

== Chicago communities ==
From east to west:

- Lake View (City of Chicago)
- North Center (City of Chicago)
- Avondale (City of Chicago)
- Irving Park (City of Chicago)
- Portage Park (City of Chicago)
- Dunning (City of Chicago)
- Franklin Park (suburb)

== Transportation ==
Addison Street is primarily served by the 152 Addison between Inner Drive and Cumberland Avenue. The southbound 94 California also serves a short segment between Rockwell Street and California Avenue.

The following CTA Lines service Addison Street

- Red Line at Sheffield Avenue
- Brown Line at Ravenswood Avenue
- Blue Line at Kennedy Expressway

== Points of interest ==
- The Chicago Police Department's historic Town Hall Police Station is located at the intersection of Addison and Halsted Streets. The police department has recently moved into a larger facility next door, and the building is being turned into senior housing.
- Wrigley Field, the home of the Chicago Cubs is located on Addison between Clark Street and Sheffield Avenue in the heart of Wrigleyville.
- Wrigleyville is the neighborhood centered on the stadium and is full of Cubs related stores, restaurants and bars. The most famous one is The Cubby Bear located directly across the street on Addison from the stadium.
- At the intersection of Addison and Western is Lane Tech High School one of the city's oldest, largest and top performing schools.
- Addison passes by the Villa District between Avondale Avenue and Pulaski Road.
- The historic Schurz High School is located at the intersection of Addison and Milwaukee and is well known for its architecture. It is an officially designated Chicago Landmark.

== Major intersections ==
The entire route is in Cook County.

Location	mi	km	Destinations	Notes
Chicago	0.0	0.0	US 41 (N Lake Shore Drive)	Eastern terminus of Addison Street; frontage road only
Chicago	3.8	6.1	I-90 / I-94 (Kennedy Expressway)	
Chicago	5.3	8.5	IL 50 (N Cicero Avenue)	
Chicago	8.4	13.5	IL 43 (N Harlem Avenue)	
Chicago	9.9	15.9	IL 171 (N Cumberland Avenue)	
1.000 mi = 1.609 km; 1.000 km = 0.621 mi
