= Addison station (CTA Brown Line) =

Chicago "L" station

Addison 3600N 1800W
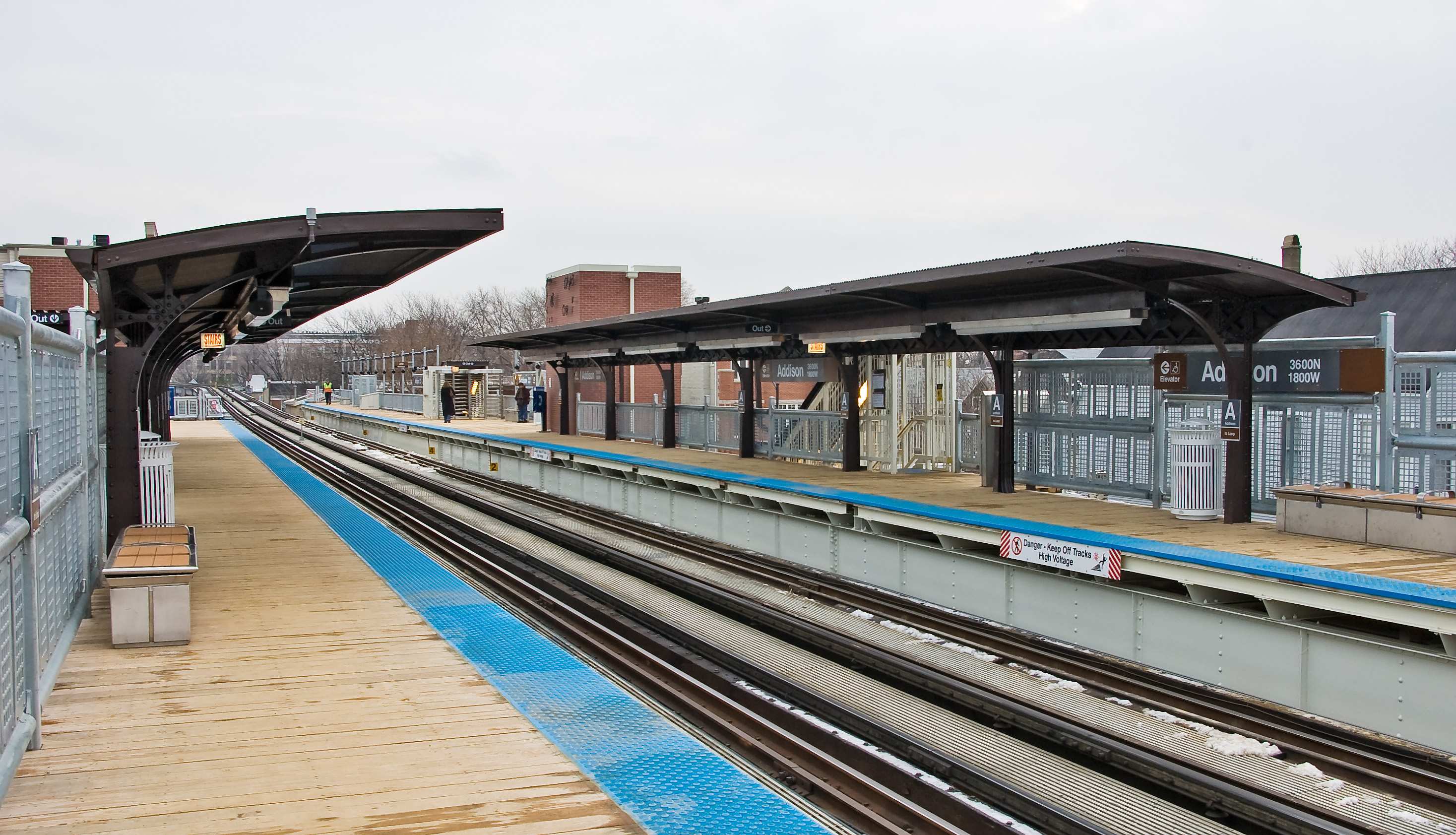

General information
- Location: 1818 West Addison Street; Chicago, Illinois 60613
- Coordinates: 41.946972°N 87.674728°W
- Owner: Chicago Transit Authority
- Line: Ravenswood Branch
- Platforms: 2 Side platforms
- Tracks: 2

Construction
- Structure type: Elevated
- Cycle facilities: Yes
- Accessible: Yes

History
- Opened: May 18, 1907; 119 years ago
- Rebuilt: 2006–2007; 19 years ago
- Former names: Addison/Lincoln (station sign)

Passengers
- 2025: 407,302 ▲9.1%

Services
Preceding station	Chicago "L"	Following station
Irving Park toward Kimball	Brown Line	Paulina toward Loop (Washington/Wells)
Track layout
Location

Addison is an 'L' station on the CTA's Brown Line. It is an elevated station with two side platforms, located at 1818–20 West Addison Street in Chicago's North Center neighborhood. The stations that are adjacent to Addison are Irving Park, one-half mile (0.80 km) to the north, and Paulina, about three-eighths mile (0.60 km) to the southeast.

== History ==
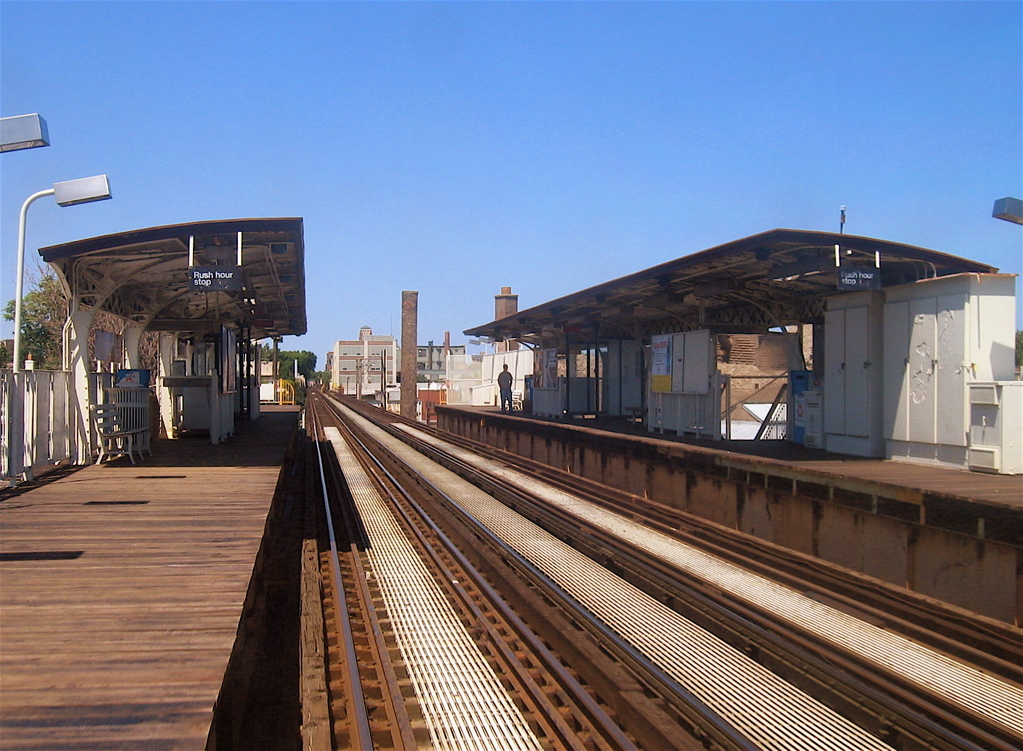
Addison station in July 2006, before reconstruction

Addison Station opened in 1907 as part of the Northwestern Elevated Railroad's Ravenswood branch.

=== Brown Line Capacity Expansion Project ===
The Brown Line Capacity Expansion Project aims to allow eight car trains on the Brown Line by the extension of the platforms at all stations. At the same time all Brown Line stations are being upgraded to become accessible to passengers with disabilities. On December 2, 2006, Addison station closed for 12 months to be rebuilt as part of this project. The station reopened on December 3, 2007, the same day which the Irving Park station closed for renovations.

== Bus connections ==
CTA

- 152 Addison
