= St. Benedict Preparatory School =

Location
- 3900 North Leavitt Street; Chicago, Illinois 60618; United States; 41°57′9″N 87°41′2″W

Information
- Type: Private
- Denomination: Roman Catholic
- Established: 1950
- Principal: Rachel Gemo
- Grades: Pre-Kindergarten–8
- Gender: Coed
- Enrollment: approx. 615
- Student to teacher ratio: Preschool: 10:1 Elementary and Middle School: 21:1
- Campus type: Urban
- Colors: Maroon and Gold
- Team name: Bengals
- Website: http://www.stbenedict.com

St. Benedict Preparatory School is a private, Roman Catholic pre-K through grade 8 school in Chicago, Illinois. It is a member of the Roman Catholic Archdiocese of Chicago. St. Benedict Preparatory School is located on the North Side of Chicago at Irving Park Road and Leavitt St.

== History ==
Founded in 1902, St. Benedict School in 1950 expanded to include a high school. In February 2017 St. Benedict Preparatory School announced it would be closing its high school. The last graduating class was in June 2019. St. Benedict Preparatory will continue its mission to serve families with Pre-Kindergarten through Grade 8 children.

== Athletics ==
Fall Sports
Girls and Boys Cross Country
Girls Volleyball

Winter Sports
Girls and Boys Basketball
Girls Cheerleading

Spring Sports
Girls and Boys Track & Field
Girls Softball
Boys Baseball
Boys Volleyball
