= Howard Street (Chicago) =

Street in Chicago, Illinois, USA

- Sibley Street; 7600 North
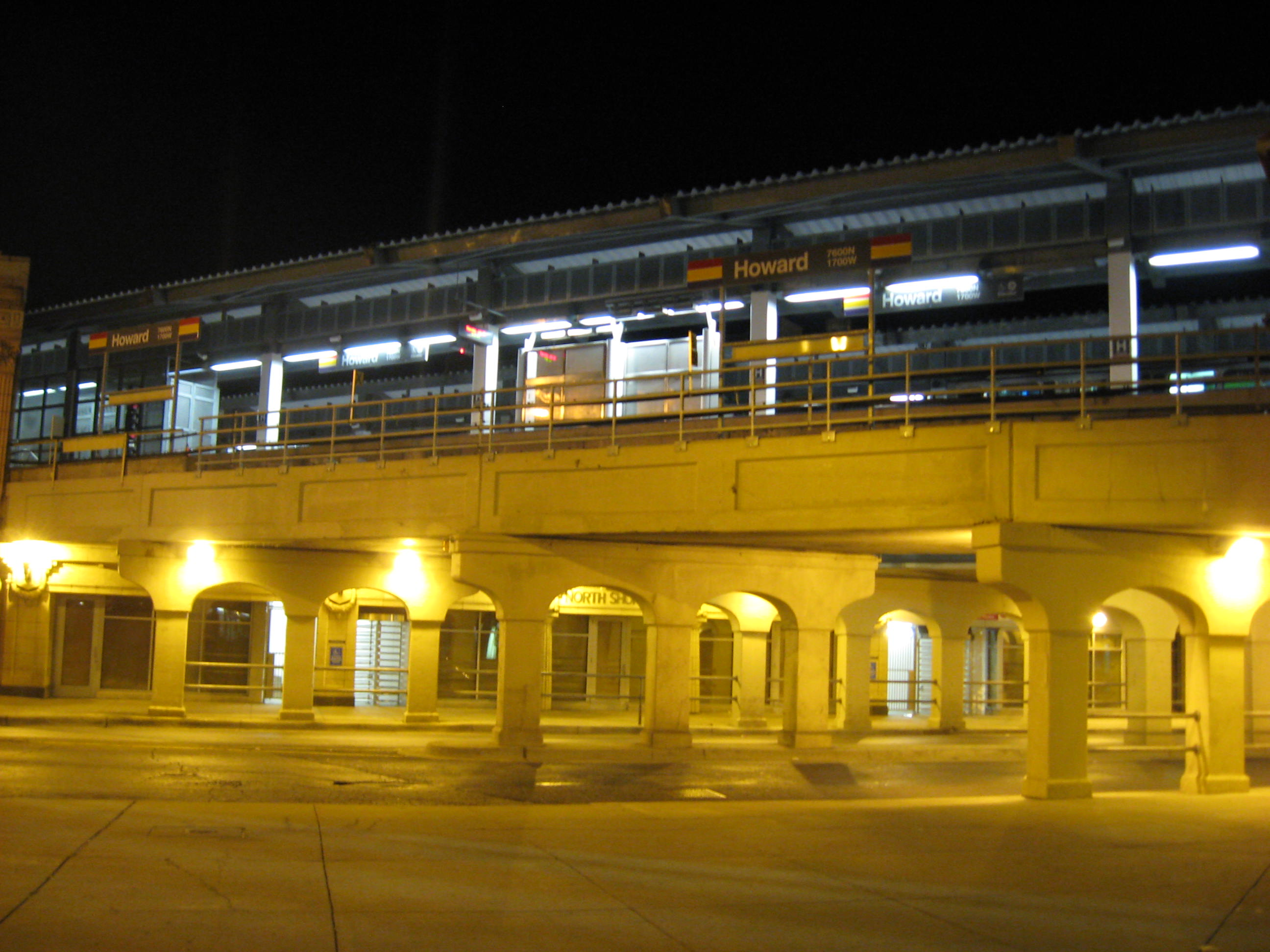
- Howard Street crossing under an "L" station
- Interactive map of Howard Street
- Coordinates: 42.0190°N 87.7477°W
- West end: Ridge Avenue, Elk Grove Village
- East end: Sheridan Road, Chicago

Howard Street, alternately known as Sibley Street in Park Ridge, is a major east–west street in the Chicago metropolitan area. At Paulina Street, it houses the Howard CTA Station, the northern terminus of the Red Line, and, between Paulina Street and Kedzie Avenue, serves as the border between the city of Chicago (community areas of Rogers Park and West Ridge) and the city of Evanston. It runs intermittently through several north and northwestern suburbs, near O'Hare International Airport, and finally terminates at Ridge Avenue in Elk Grove Village. The street is located at 7600 N in Chicago's address system.
