= Dank =

Dank or DANK may refer to:

- Dank (horse), a British-trained thoroughbred racehorse
- Dank (surname), a surname
- Dank, Romania, a village in the commune of Aghireșu, Romania
- DANK Haus German American Cultural Center, a cultural organization in Chicago, Illinois, U.S.
- Dank meme, an Internet meme that is said to be "cool" or "awesome"
- Dank (cannabis), a slang name for cannabis or marijuana
- Deutsch Amerikanischer National Kongress (German American National Congress)

== See also ==
- Danker, a surname
- Danks, a surname
