= Davis Theater =

Movie theater in Chicago, Illinois

- Pershing Theater
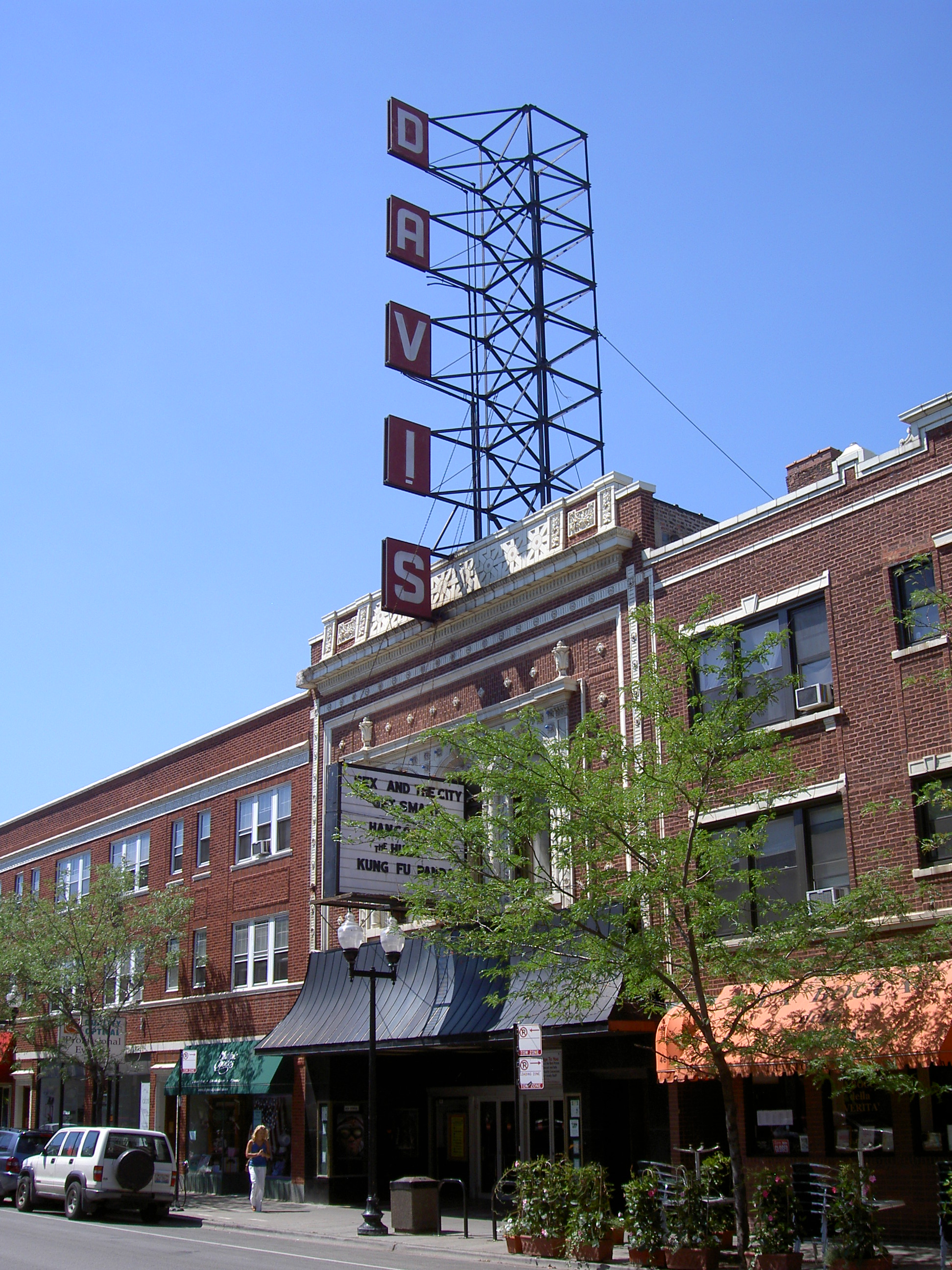
- Front shot of Davis Theater along Lincoln Avenue
- Interactive map of Davis Theater
- Address: 4614 North Lincoln Avenue; Chicago, Illinois 60625; United States
- Coordinates: 41.965438°N 87.686837°W
- Owner: Green Screenz Entertainment Group
- Operator: Green Screenz Entertainment Group
- Type: Movie theater (first run)

Construction
- Opened: 1918
- Architect: Walter W. Ahlschlager

Website
- http://www.davistheater.com
- Davis Theater
- U.S. National Register of Historic Places
- Location: 4616-4630 N. Lincoln Ave., Chicago, Illinois
- Coordinates: 41°57′55″N 87°41′11″W
- NRHP reference No.: 15000930
- Added to NRHP: April 26, 2016

The Davis Theater, originally known as the Pershing Theater, is a first run movie theater located in the Lincoln Square neighborhood of Chicago. Built in 1918, the theater has operated in different capacities in its history, showing silent films, German-language films, and various forms of stage performance. In 1999, the Davis was planned to be demolished to build residential condos, but the plans were cancelled in part due to a negative response from the community. It is one of the few operating neighborhood movie theaters in Chicago. Its building was listed on the National Register of Historic Places in 2016.

== History ==
The Pershing Theater was built in 1918 and was named after First World War General of the Armies, John J. Pershing. It is the only remaining theater of five built in Lincoln Square, and one of the few neighborhood theaters still operating in Chicago. The building was designed by architect Walter W. Ahlschlager, who was also responsible for the design of other famous buildings such as the Uptown Broadway Building in Chicago and the Roxy Theater in New York City. The Pershing opened showing silent films, its first being The Forbidden City and later Pals First. In the 1930s, the Pershing was converted to show talkies at a cost of approximately $10,000 and was renamed the Davis Theater.

The Pershing had some involvement in The Case of the Ragged Stranger, an infamous Chicago murder case of the early 1920s. Carl Wanderer and Ruth Johnson, husband and wife, left the theater shortly before Johnson was murdered. Although the murder was initially pinned on a stranger dressed in ragged clothing, an investigation revealed new evidence that suggested that Wanderer was, in fact, guilty of the murder. Wanderer was ultimately convicted and executed.

Starting in the 1952, the theater attempted to appeal to the cultural influences in the neighborhood by showing German-language films in addition to American films. The theater eventually transformed to a German film house, even acting as host for the Chicago International Film Festival in 1972 where they opened with Signs of Life. The Davis continued to show German films through the end of the decade. The theater then transitioned to showing a variety of entertainment including puppet shows, second run films, and revivals through the 1970s. In 1979, a plan to revitalize the theater by modernizing it and concentrating on movie revivals was supported by film critic and Chicago resident Gene Siskel, but it was unsuccessful within months.

In June 1980, the Davis hosted the Chicago International Film Festival's Dance Film Festival, which featured a week-long showcase of dance-themed films such as Divine Madness and Non-Stop Astaire, the latter of which was a collection of film dance routines featuring Fred Astaire with other notable dancers such as Judy Garland and Ginger Rogers.

In January 2016, the theater was closed for renovation and brought back to life in its current state as a historical landmark and community center for cinema and the arts. The architecture firm for the renovation was Kennedy Mann. In 2018, they were awarded the Award for Rehabilitation by Landmarks Illinois.

== Planned demolition ==
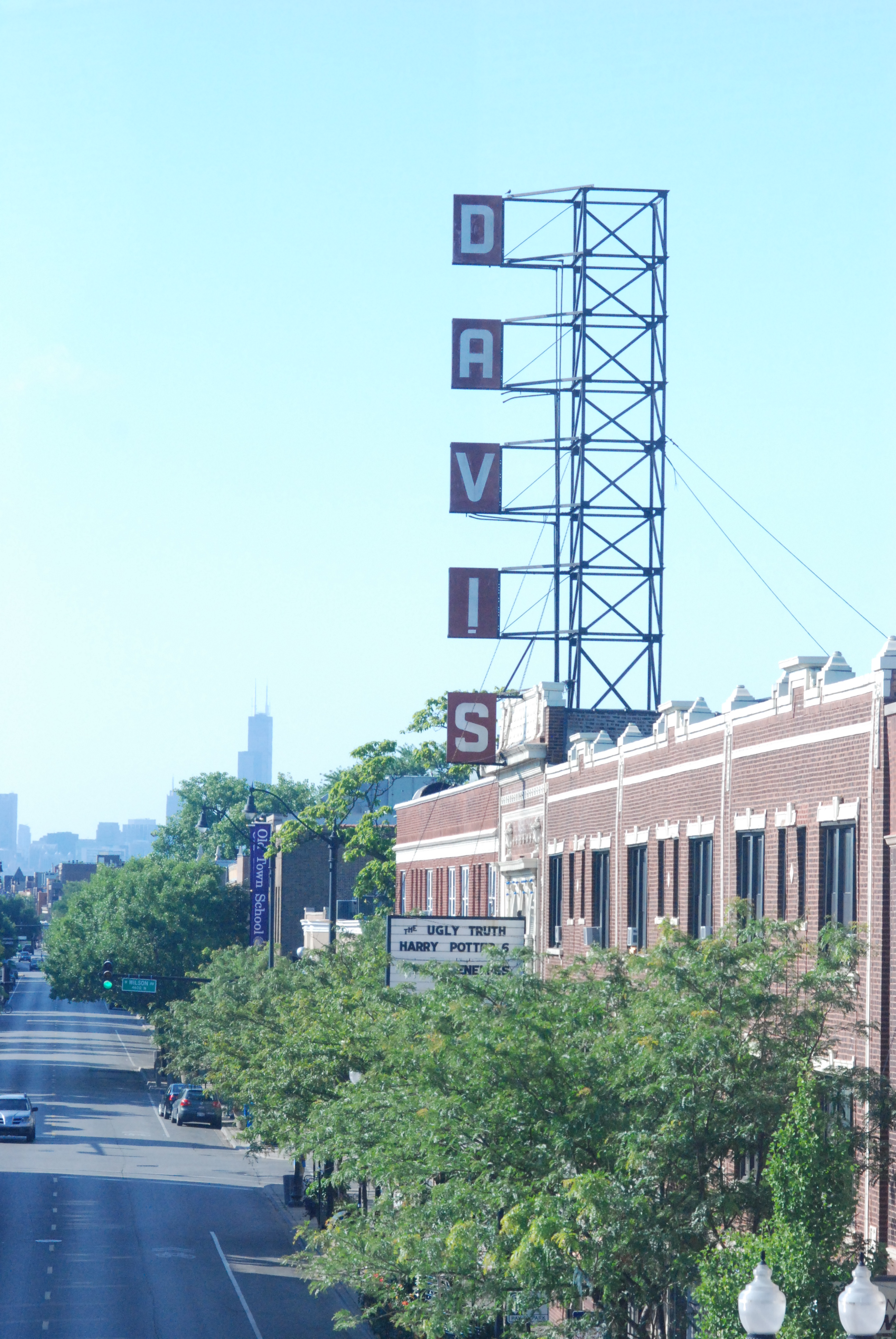
Photo of the Davis Theater sign, facing southeast on Lincoln Avenue

In October 1999, the Davis was put up for sale at an asking price of $1.6M with the description, "This ornate theater is waiting to be developed into a shopping mall". The realtor, Edward Vanek, showed the property to several interested developers who considered turning the complex into condominiums, a mall, or even a theater with food and liquor services. The Davis was eventually sold to developer Jim Jaeger later that year, who was rumored to be planning its demolition and replacement with residential housing.

Soon after, a "Save the Davis" campaign was organized to prevent the theater's demolition, and included a community meeting at the Conrad Sulzer Regional Library, where over 500 people voiced opposition to the demolition of the theater. Participants in the meeting argued that demolishing the building would be a historical loss and expressed frustration that useful small businesses had been lost to the community in order to build more residential units. The campaign was supported by alderman Eugene Schulter, who refused to rezone the property to accommodate the redevelopment plans.

The property was bid on in December 1999, and acquired by a non-profit, Davis Theater Preservation Corporation, headed by community resident Mary Edsey. The property was sold to Special Real Estate Services in 2000, and thereafter the theater began to show first run films once again.

== Present operations ==
The Davis Theater is currently operated as a first run theater, containing three screens. It also regularly shows second runs of older films, and hosts private events. It is owned by Greenscreenz Entertainment LLC. It was renovated to replace its film projectors with digital film. The Davis participated in the Chicago International Children's Film Festival in 2008.
