= Germans in Chicago =

Ethnic group in Chicago

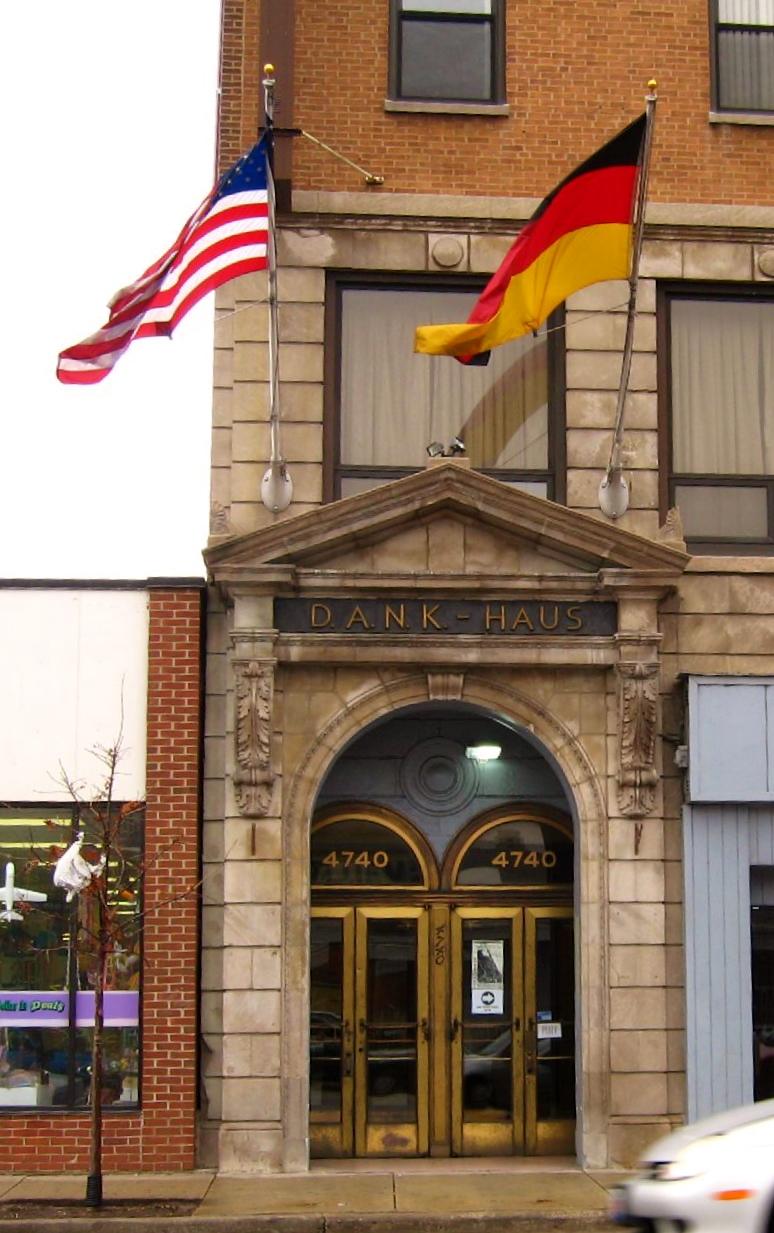
DANK Haus German American Cultural Center

Historically, Chicago has had an ethnic German population. As of the 2000 U.S. census, 15.8% of people in the Chicago area had German ancestry, and those of German ancestry were the largest ethnic group in 80% of Chicago's suburbs. As of the year 1930, those of German ancestry were the largest European ethnic group in Chicago. However, as of today that number has decreased to 6%.

== 19th century ==
The first Germans arrived in Chicago in the 1830s. Germans arrived in the United States as Chicago began to develop in the mid-19th century. 1,000 Germans were in Chicago in 1845.

In 1848, the first large group of Germans immigrated due to failed revolts in German states. The Germans arriving on or soon after that year became known as the "Forty-Eighters". Irving Cutler, the author of Chicago, wrote that their true underlying motive to come to the U.S. was economic even though they had to immediately leave Germany due to political issues. According to Cutler, these Germans did not place importance on religious reasons, and they "arrived much less destitute" compared to Irish immigrants. The German population increased to 5,073 in 1850, and that year Germans made up 1/6th of Chicago's population.

In 1855, Mayor of Chicago Levi Boone declared that on Sundays all beer gardens and saloons will be closed, leading to the Lager Beer Riots.

There were 22,230 ethnic Germans in Chicago, or 20% of the city's population, in 1860.

One of the leading newspapers of the region in the late 19th century was the German language Illinois Staats-Zeitung, owned by former Cook County Sheriff A.C. Hesing, who was also the first German-born elected official in Chicago. The paper's chief editors included U.S. Representative Lorenzo Brentano and Collector of Internal Revenue Hermann Raster. The Staats-Zeitung was in publication until its support for Germany in World War I and a subsequent scandal involving the American Legion caused its failure in 1921.

The Haymarket Riot occurred in 1886.

The peak of German immigration was 1890.

In 1900, there were 470,000 Chicago residents who had at least one parent born in Germany and/or who were born in Germany themselves. Those of German descent were the largest ethnic group of Chicago from 1850 until the turn of the century.

German-born citizens occupied many of Chicago's highest political offices of the 19th century, including County Clerk, Sheriff, Coroner, City Clerk, City Treasurer, City Marshall and General Superintendent of Police, and County Treasurer.

== 20th century ==
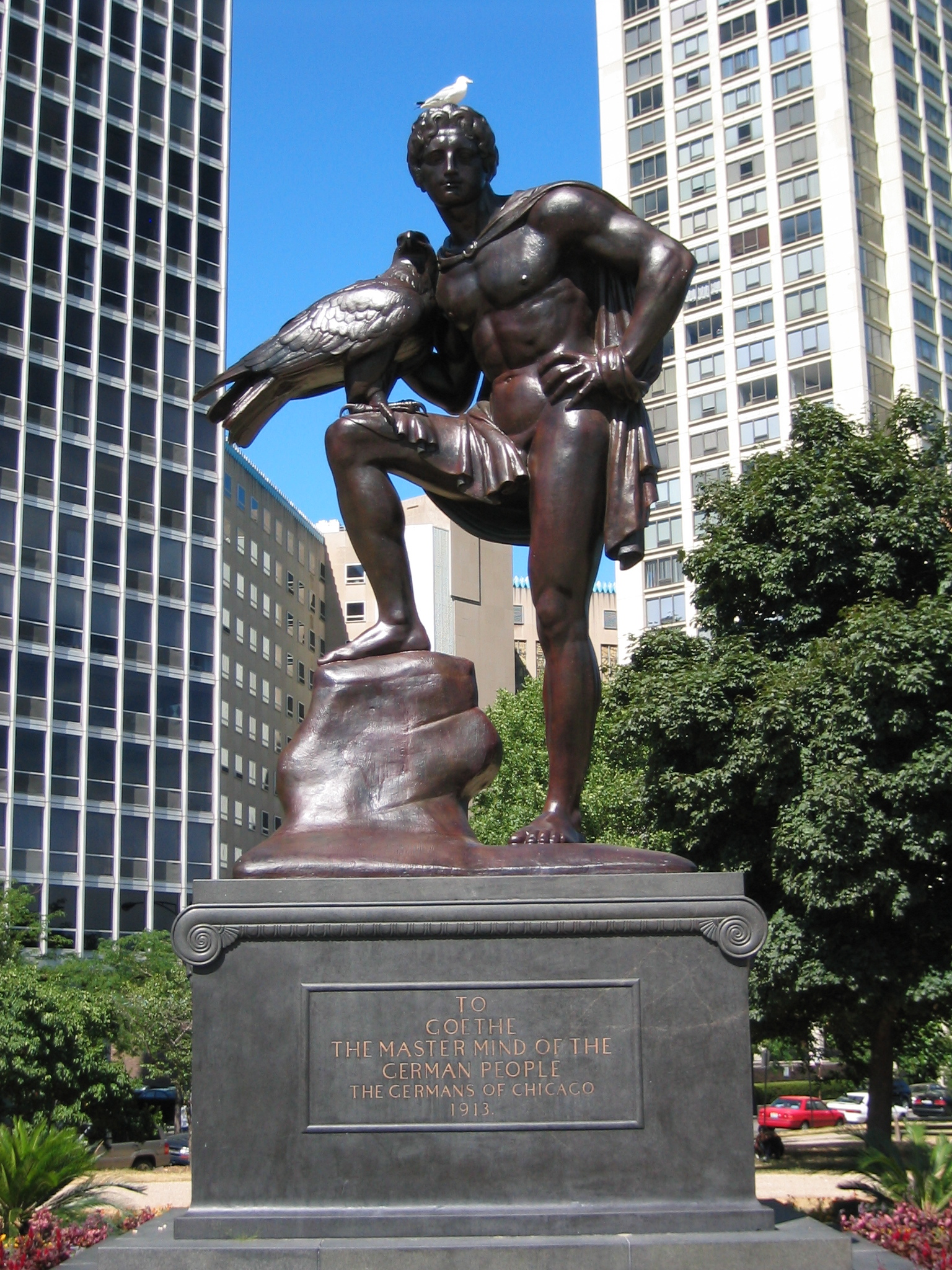
Goethe Monument dedicated by the Germans of Chicago. Erected in 1913.

German immigration decreased in the 20th century due to increases in the German economy and new restrictions on immigration.

In 1914, there were 191,168 people born in Germany living in Chicago; this was the peak number of German-born people in Chicago.

In 1920, 22% of Chicagoans self-reported as being of German ancestry. The lower numbers were because of a reluctance to report German ancestry due to anti-German sentiment from World War I and because of reduced immigration from Germany.

In the World War II era anti-Hitler dissidents and German Jews immigrated to Chicago. In the post-World War II era ethnic Germans expelled from Czechoslovakia, Hungary, and Yugoslavia arrived in Chicago.

In 1980, 6% of Chicago's population born outside of the United States was from Germany. After 1980, this percentage decreased.

== Geography ==
Historically, the bulk of Chicago's Germans lived in the North Side with the center of the German population being Lakeview. In German the North Side was called the "Nord Seite".

There were smaller numbers in the South Side that worked mainly in meatpacking. Joseph C. Heinen and Susan Barton Heinen, authors of Lost German Chicago, stated that in the 1970s, some "vestiges" of the South Side German community remained but otherwise it had "quickly dispersed" in the 20th century.

== Demographics ==
By the end of the 19th century, about 35% of the Germans originated from northeast Germany. In the 1880s and 1890s, most of Chicago's German immigration originated from the estates in rural northeast Germany in places such as Mecklenburg, Pomerania, and Prussia. By the end of the 19th century, 25% were from southwest Germany. 17% were from northwest Germany. 12% were from southeast; in the 1830s, most immigration came from southwestern Germany. By the end of the 19th century, 11% were from western Germany. Most German immigration in the 1850s and 1860s came from the middle part of the country.

By the end of the 19th century, about 55% of Chicago's Germans were Roman Catholic. The Protestant population was smaller. According to Christiane Harzig of the Encyclopedia of Chicago, they "were more outspoken on political and community issues." There were about 20,000 German Jews in Chicago by 1900.

== Institutions ==
The DANK Haus German American Cultural Center is located in Lincoln Square, Chicago. The Goethe-Institut Chicago is located in downtown Chicago and offers cultural programs, German language courses and exams.

== Politics ==
In the 19th century, many Chicago Germans became involved in antislavery abolition movements. Notable German American abolitionists in Chicago included Wilhelm Rapp and Hermann Raster.

In the late 19th century, many Germans in Chicago were involved in anarchist-radical politics. At that time German Americans were the primary leaders of the Socialist Labor Party and by 1890 it was essentially a German-speaking group. German was one of the organization's two official languages used in its meetings. German Americans disproportionately made up those who participated in the 1886 Haymarket Riot.

Several factors caused German American involvement in radical politics to cease by the 20th century. In the 1880s and 1890s, the living standards of German Americans had improved, making them better than those in Germany. In addition, agitators and radical emigrant editors stopped coming to Chicago because Bismarck repealed Germany's anti-socialist laws.

== See also ==
- Luxembourgers in Chicago
- History of the Jews in Chicago
