= Square Roots (disambiguation) =

Square Roots festival (or simply Square Roots) is a music festival in the United States.

Square Roots may also refer to:

- Square Roots: The Story of SpongeBob SquarePants, an animated film
- Square Roots (company), a vertical farming company cofounded by Kimbal Musk

== See also ==
- Square root, a mathematical operation
