= Carl Wanderer =

American murderer

- Born: June 26, 1895; Chicago, Illinois
- Died: September 30, 1921 (aged 26); Cook County Jail, Illinois, U.S.
- Known for: "The Case of the Ragged Stranger"
- Spouse: Ruth Johnson
- Status: Executed by hanging
- Conviction: Murder (2 counts)
- Penalty: Death

Carl Otto Wanderer (June 26, 1895 – September 30, 1921) was a convicted murderer tied to what became known as "The Case of the Ragged Stranger". Wanderer murdered his wife Ruth and a "ragged stranger" in a bizarre plot, whose exact motivations remain unknown. The case was cracked in part by famed Chicago-based reporter and future screenwriter Ben Hecht, of the Chicago Daily News, and reporter and future playwright Charles MacArthur of the Chicago Examiner.

== Early years ==
Wanderer, born in Chicago, was the son of German immigrants. He dropped out of school before he reached high school, but he was a diligent worker who saved money. By his twenties, Wanderer and his father were running a successful butcher shop. His mother died by suicide when Wanderer was a teenager.

Wanderer enlisted in the Illinois Cavalry and served under John Pershing in the latter's expedition against Pancho Villa in 1916. He served with distinction and became a lieutenant in the U.S. Army, seeing heavy action on the Western Front in World War I. Wanderer claimed to have been heavily decorated, but military colleagues later cast doubt on this claim.

In late 1919, he married twenty-year-old Ruth Johnson, and the two moved in with Ruth's parents. Ruth became pregnant; reportedly, Wanderer became despondent upon hearing the news and became distant towards his family. Wanderer often told friends and family that he missed the Army and wished to reenlist, implying that Ruth opposed the idea.

== The shooting ==
On June 21, 1920, Wanderer and his wife were returning home from the Pershing Theater in Lincoln Square when shots rang out in the hallway of the Johnson apartment. Ruth's mother heard the shots and rushed to the scene, finding Wanderer pummeling the body of a man in ragged clothing with his gun. Ruth lay dying with several shots in her chest, and reportedly said "My baby is dead" before dying. According to Wanderer's account, the man had been tailing them and followed them into the vestibule of their apartment, presumably to rob them, and Wanderer drew his military service pistol—a Colt M1911—and exchanged fire with the intruder. Wanderer killed the assailant, but his wife was killed by the shooter, who was not immediately identified.

The case became a cause célèbre, with extensive press coverage. The public expressed outrage that Wanderer—a war hero who was expecting a child—would be set upon and have his pregnant wife killed. Wanderer was praised for his bravery in defending his wife. However, the circumstances of Ruth's death were suspicious enough to inspire a police investigation.

== Investigation ==
Ben Hecht and Charles MacArthur investigated the case in conjunction with police. Hecht's first clue was a police photograph of the two weapons used in the shooting. Both were virtually identical Colt M1911's. Hecht thought it odd that the man, named Watson, who appeared to be a penniless vagrant—he had less than $5 on his person when found—would carry such an expensive weapon which was not widely available to the public at the time, instead of selling it. He also found it hard to believe that a mere drifter would risk a conflict with a veteran who was widely known to carry a gun. MacArthur came to a similar conclusion and came to find that Watson's weapon had been sold to Wanderer's cousin Fred several years earlier.

Meanwhile, Chicago Police Sergeant John Norton uncovered Wanderer's relationship with Julia Schmitt, a 17-year-old stenographer who claimed to be pursuing an affair with Wanderer. Norton's account claims that Schmitt described several dates with Wanderer and showed him sexually explicit letters she had received. Schmitt would also claim that Wanderer proposed marriage to her if he was able to leave or divorce Ruth.

Ben Hecht later claimed that shortly after the killing, he interviewed Wanderer and was struck by Wanderer's happy and seemingly impassive manner just days after his wife's murder. According to Hecht's story, he found articles of women's clothing in a bathrobe and stumbled across several love letters Wanderer had written to a man called "James". Many writers dispute Hecht's account; records of Wanderer's interrogation and trial make no mention of "James." However, a police psychologist would accuse Wanderer of "latent homosexuality" during his trial.

Shortly afterwards, police arrested Wanderer. He initially denied the charges, saying that the stranger's gun was not his, but one that had been part of a mass arms shipment by the Army to a training camp he'd been in during the war. However, police learned during their interrogation that Ruth Wanderer had withdrawn $1500 from her bank account the morning of the killing. Later, Hecht located the money in question at Wanderer's home.

== Confession, trial and conviction ==
Confronted with this evidence, Wanderer confessed. He told the police that he murdered his wife and the stranger to make it look like a robbery. After he found out Ruth was pregnant, Wanderer hired a vagrant as part of a bizarre scheme. Wanderer told the man that his relationship with his wife was deteriorating, and he wanted to stage a fight to prove himself a hero to Ruth. When Watson showed up at the apartment, however, Wanderer shot both him and his wife with the two Colts and staged it so that Ruth's mother would think Watson had killed Ruth.

Wanderer's precise motivation for the crime remains cloudy, as investigators, and Wanderer himself, offered contradictory information. The Chicago police believed he murdered Ruth to collect her money, but Hecht and Norton's accounts (despite their significant difference in details) each suggest Wanderer killed her due to an extramarital affair. Wanderer told one investigator that he killed Ruth in order to "return to the military", matching comments he'd made before Ruth's murder. However, Wanderer's written confession suggests that he had simply tired of marriage, but was unwilling to obtain a divorce.

Throughout his first trial, Wanderer's defense attempted to prove that he was insane, and that Wanderer's confession had been coerced. His father and sister testified to the family history of mental illness, while an Army colleague claimed that Wanderer suffered a head injury during his military service. In his testimony, Wanderer denied both killing Ruth (claiming the police had beaten him into confessing) and knowing Julia Schmitt.

Wanderer's first trial ended in a hung jury but he was convicted of killing his wife in a second trial and was given a 25-year sentence for manslaughter, which outraged many Chicagoans. At the second trial, the prosecution called Julia Schmitt as a witness; the prosecutor was said to have proclaimed "Kisses for Julia; bullets for Ruth" in his summation.

Wanderer was tried separately for killing the "ragged stranger" and was convicted of first degree murder. The court rejected efforts to proclaim him insane (after Wanderer claimed he saw visions of his dead wife in prison) and sentenced him to death. He was executed on September 30, 1921, singing "Old Pal Why Don’t You Answer Me” before being hanged.

== "Stranger's" identity ==
The stranger was never solidly identified. He was variously identified by parents, friends, and reporters as a host of men, including John J. Maloney, "a circus canvasman and ex-soldier," Al Watson, John Barrett, Earl Keesee and Joseph Ahrens; the coroner joked about the inability of the man to stay identified. Investigators considered the most credible possibilities as Barrett, a former Canadian Soldier who disappeared from Chicago's skid row that same day, or Eddie Ryan, whose mother was a homeless washerwoman named Nellie Ryan who had given him years earlier to a farmer to raise and then identified his body.

Finally in August 1921, the coroner released the body for burial after a woman identified him as her son who she had sent off to a farm 18 years earlier and had never seen again. The police and newspaper reporters never explained the fact that the stranger, although dressed in rags, recently had had a professional manicure and was closely shaven. The man had no money on him to pay for such luxuries and the $1.25 paid to him by Wanderer for food and car fare would not have covered these services either.
