= Square Roots festival =

Square Roots
- Logo for the Square Roots festival
- Genre: Various; focus on folk and world music
- Frequency: Annual
- Location: Chicago, Illinois
- Years active: 23
- Inaugurated: 1998
- Most recent: 2026
- Website: squareroots.org

Square Roots (previously called the Folk & Roots Festival) is a music festival that has been held each summer in the Lincoln Square neighborhood in Chicago since 1998. Organized by the Old Town School of Folk Music and the Lincoln Square Chamber of Commerce, the festival features world music and dance performances from a variety of genres, with particular emphasis on folk and world music.

== History ==
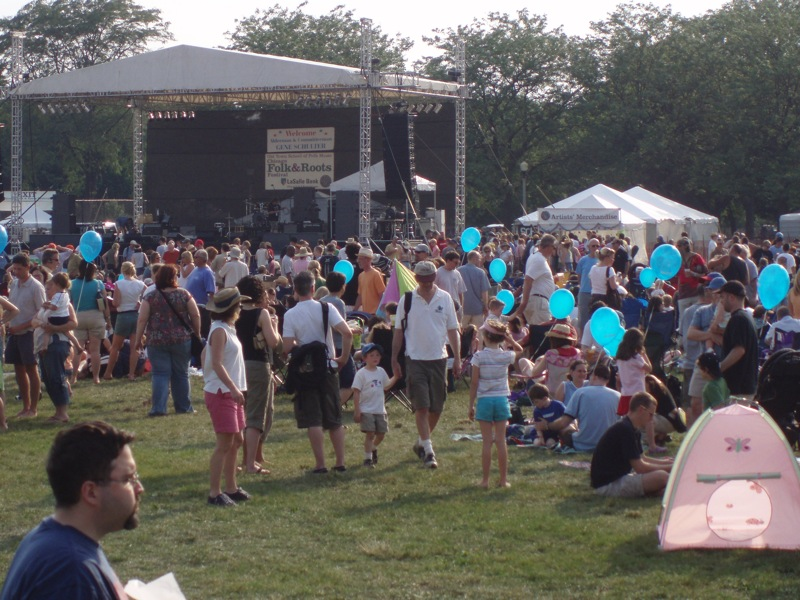
Main stage at the 2006 Folk & Roots Festival

The Folk & Roots Festival began in 1998 and was coordinated solely by the Old Town School of Folk Music. Each year, the event was held at Welles Park in Lincoln Square. The festival showcased a variety of performances from different musical traditions. For instance, in 2001, the festival hosted, among others, the Super Rail Band from Mali, Nigerian afrobeat musician Femi Kuti, and the Texan country band The Flatlanders. It also featured well-known folk performers as well, such as Patti Smith and Richard Thompson. The lineup of performances at Folk & Roots festivals have been described as "eclectic." In addition to performances, The Folk & Roots Festival also held dance workshops and events for children.

In 2012, the Old Town School of Folk Music announced they would not be organizing the Folk & Roots Festival in 2012. This decision may have been based on changes in city policy that would have added significant financial burden to the school, such as increased costs in permits and rentals in Welles Park for performance space and no longer allowing vendors at the festival to use the city's power grid for electrical needs. However, Old Town School of Folk Music's executive director stated that the reason for the cancellation was to create a new festival that would highlight the school's new building completed in 2011. It is not clear if the festival will be planned for 2013, but the Old Town School of Folk Music director, Bau Graves, noted that he wouldn't "close the door" on bringing Folk & Roots back in the future.

== Square Roots ==
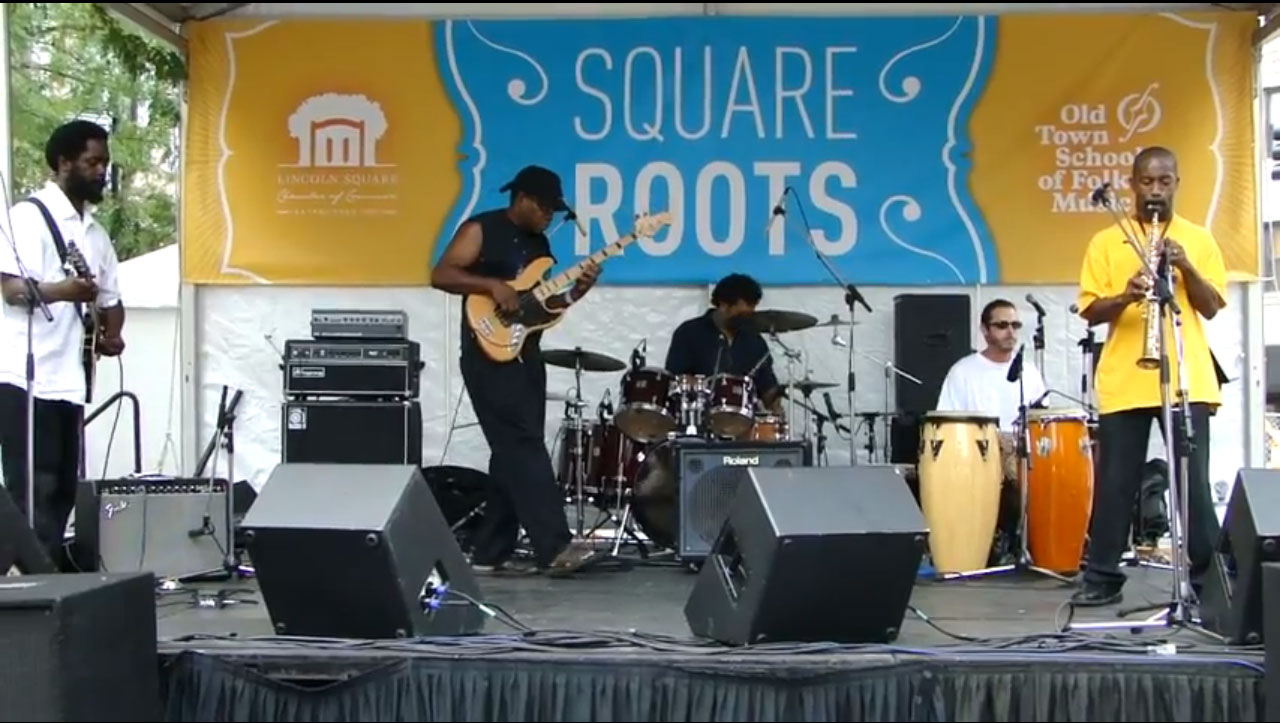
Jazz band Magic Carpet performs at Square Roots 2012.

Like the Folk and Roots Festival, Square Roots has also hosted performances from a variety of music traditions. In its first year in 2012, Square Roots hosted the country group Waco Brothers, Malian blues singer Sidi Touré, funk band Kong Fuzi, and Colorado folk quintet Elephant Revival, among others.

Another focus of the festival is on supporting local businesses. Lincoln Square Chamber of Commerce vice president Jason Kraus has expressed that ideally, 80 to 100 percent of the food vendors would be from neighborhoods around Lincoln Square, such as Ravenswood or Northcenter. In 2012, Square Roots invited numerous local restaurants and breweries as vendors during the festival. Square Roots is expected to continue in 2013.

In 2012, entrance to the Square Roots fest was as suggested $10 donation for adults, and was discounted for children and seniors. Proceeds went to the Old Town School of Folk Music and the Lincoln Square Chamber of Commerce to benefit music programs, summer concerts, music education, and local farmer's markets in the area.
