= Merz Apothecary =

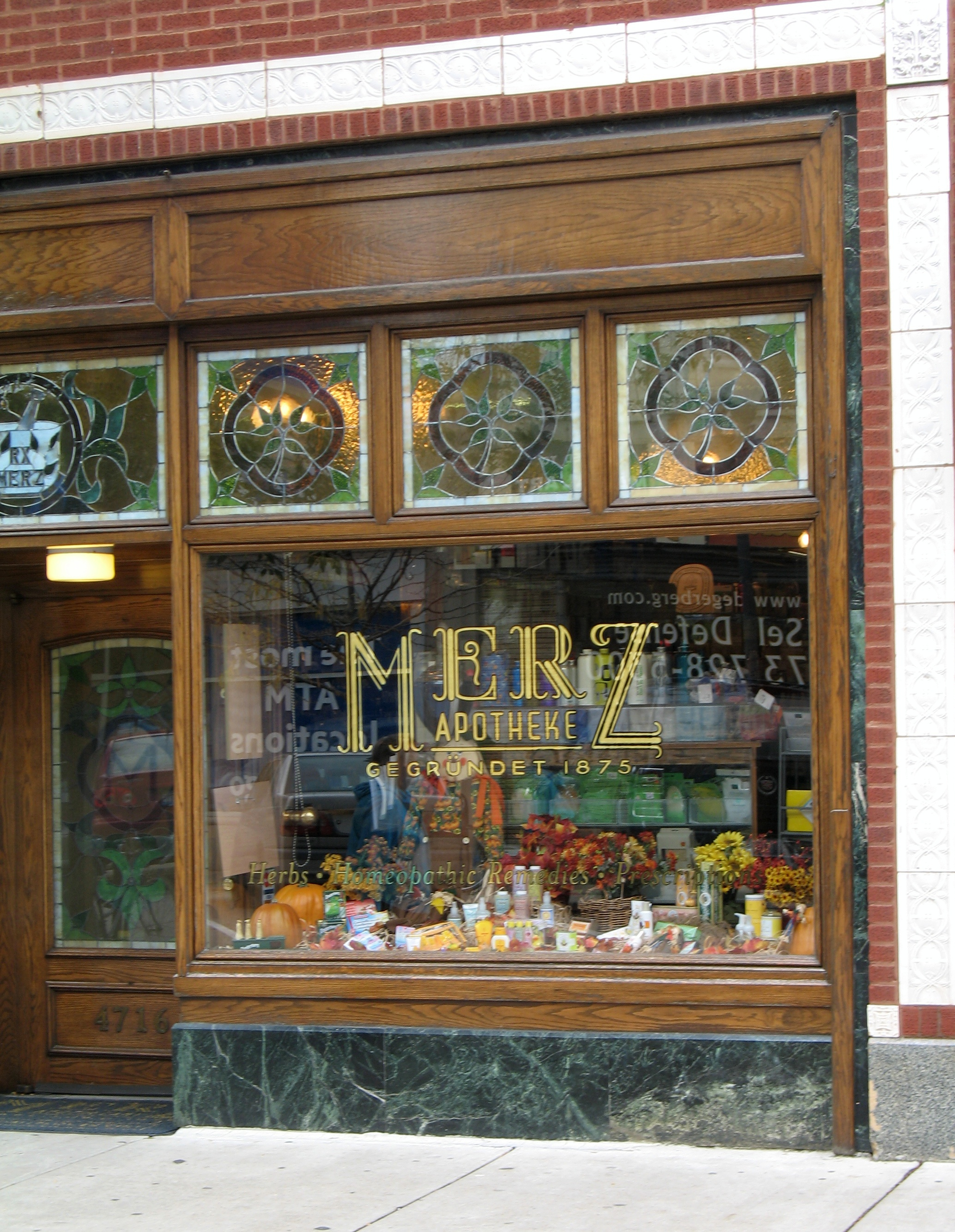
- Storefront of Merz Apothecary
- Company type: Privately held company
- Industry: Natural medicine
- Founded: Chicago, Illinois, United States (1875)
- Founder: Peter Merz
- Successor: Abdul Qaiyum; Anthony Qaiyum
- Headquarters: Chicago, United States
- Number of locations: 2
- Website: merzapothecary.com

Merz Apothecary, located in the Lincoln Square neighborhood in Chicago, is a historic healthcare store that was opened by pharmacist Peter Merz in 1875. Merz Apothecary focuses on herbal, homeopathic medicines, natural medicine, European products, and bath products. Some of its most popular products include Nivea cream, Underberg bitters, soap made from brazil nuts, and Oscillococcinum.

== History ==
Peter Merz, a pharmacist of Swiss descent, opened the store in 1875, using the name "Apothecary" as his customers were predominantly European. The store was quite typical of drug corner stores at the time, and focused on herbal medicines that his European customers were already accustomed to. The store had a secondary function as a gathering place; it contained comfortable seating such as leather chairs, and allowed patrons to sit and chat while waiting for their medicinal orders to be prepared. Furthermore, pharmacists at the Apothecary were multilingual and facilitated ease of communication between the employees and the diverse base of customers. Current pharmacists at the store continue to be able to speak several languages.

The store continued to perform well through the 1960s. In 1972, and after three-generations of Merz owners, then-owner Ralph Merz sought to retire but there was no one in the family to succeed him as owner. The store was to be closed, but one month before the planned closing, 26-year-old Pakistani pharmacist Abdul Qaiyum offered to purchase the building and continue to run the business under the same name. Qaiyum moved the store to its present location in the Lincoln Square neighborhood in 1982, and custom-built the store in style of a 20th-century apothecary. This style is reflected in the interior of the store through the antique pharmacy jars, leaded glass windows, parquet floors, tin ceilings, and solid oak cabinets.

== Present day ==
Qaiyum later passed on ownership of the store to his son, Anthony. The store also began to run a website for online orders called SmallFlower.com in 1998. Anthony Qaiyum noted that he chose the domain name because of obscurity of the store's name; he had asked many of his friends if they could spell the word apothecary or knew how to define it. Qaiyum said that "both of them were depressing results." In 2009, the store upgraded its e-commerce and inventory management systems. One motivation for this change were sudden spikes in product demand; in these situations, the store could not meet the full demand. For instance, on her talk show, Oprah Winfrey had once selected a Claus Porto soap product as one of her favorites. The website received orders amounting to tens of thousands of dollars, but only a fraction of those orders were able to be filled. Qaiyum opened another storefront inside of a Macy's in downtown Chicago in 2003, which was later moved to the Palmer House Hilton. The downtown location closed in the aftermath of the COVID-19 pandemic.

In 2011 and 2012, Merz Apothecary hosted The Great Shave, an event featuring demonstrations of traditional men's shaving in addition to seminars on related topics such as the use of the straight razor and the use of lather. The event has been considered the largest event dedicated to wet shaving in the United States. The event sold out in both years.
