= Danks =

Danks is a surname. Notable people with the surname include:

- Aaron Danks (born 1985), English football coach
- Clayton Danks (1879–1970), Wyoming rodeo champion
- Dale Danks (1939–2021), American politician and lawyer
- David M. Danks (1931–2003), Australian medical geneticist
- Denise Danks (born 1953), British novelist
- John Danks (born 1985), American baseball pitcher
- John Danks & Son, manufacturer and hardware merchant family of Melbourne, Australia
- Joseph Danks (born 1962), American spree killer
- Mark Danks (born 1984), English football striker
- Sharon Gamson Danks, American landscape architect
