= Dank (surname) =

Dank is a surname. Notable people with the surname include:

- David Dank (1938–2015), American politician
- Odilia Dank (1938–2013), American politician and educator, wife of David
- Ran Dank (born 1982), Israeli pianist
- Sleep Dank (21st century), American rapper

== See also ==
- Rank (surname)
