= DANK Haus German American Cultural Center =

DANK-Haus German American Cultural Center
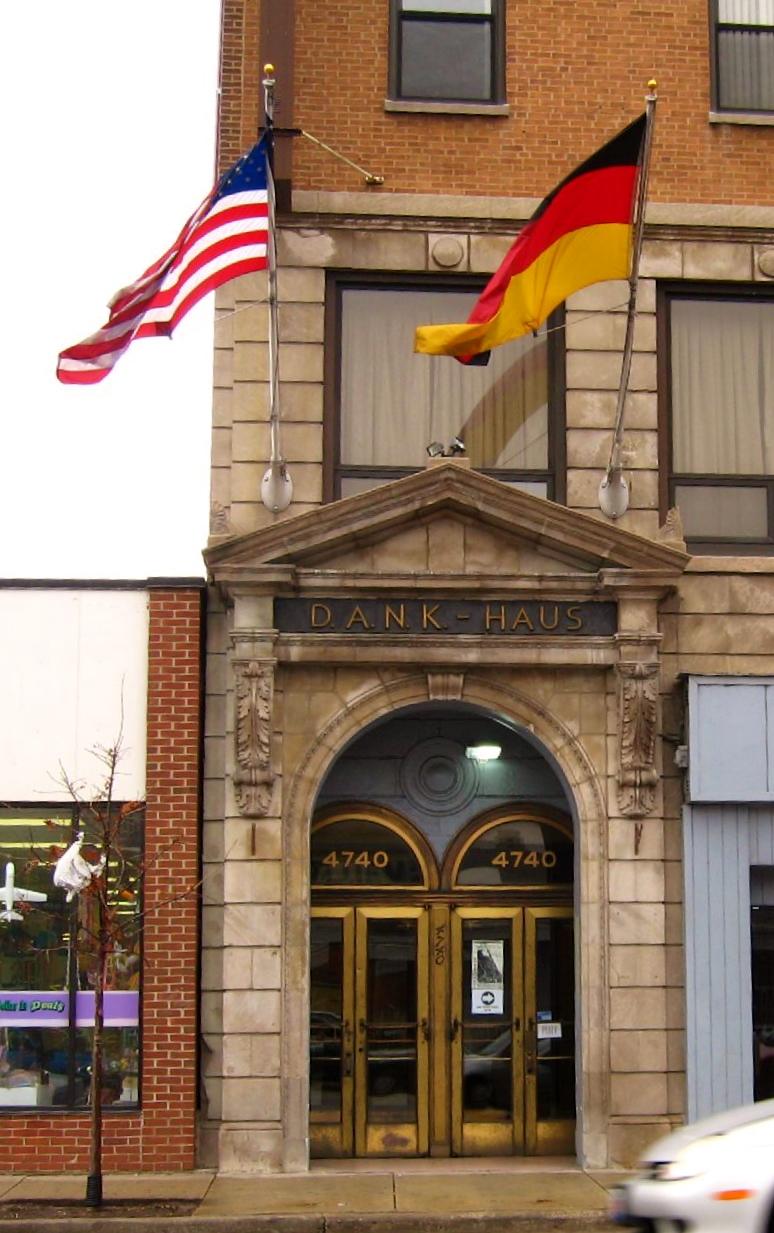
- Established: 1959
- Location: 4740 North Western Avenue; Chicago, IL 60625; P:773.561.9181
- Website: http://dankhaus.com

DANK-Haus German American Cultural Center is a cultural organization located in the Lincoln Square, Chicago community area. Founded in Chicago in 1959, it seeks to preserve and promote German and German American culture. The center contains the DANK museum, Scharpenberg art gallery, a library (Koegel Bibliothek), facilities for social gatherings, and offers German language classes. It is a member organization of the Chicago Cultural Alliance.

The Cultural Center has its origins in the founding of the Deutsch Amerikanischer National Kongress (German American National Congress, or DANK), an organization dedicated to German American welfare and culture. In German, Dank, as well as danke, is used in phrases expressing thanks. The headquarters of the Congress is housed in the center. Also founded in 1959, largely through the work of Leonard Enders, editor of the German-language newspaper Abendpost und Sonntagspost, the congress has chapters in different areas of the United States.

The Cultural Center building was designed by architect Paul Gerhardt and built in 1927, as a multipurpose center for a social club. It still contains an Olympic-size swimming pool. It was purchased by DANK in 1967.

== See also ==
- Germans in Chicago
