= Rank (surname) =

Rank is the surname of:

- J. Arthur Rank, 1st Baron Rank (1888–1972), British industrialist and film producer
- Joseph Rank (1854-1943), founder of Rank Hovis McDougall, one of the UK's largest food production and flour-milling businesses
- Otto Rank (1884–1939), Austrian psychoanalyst, writer, teacher, and therapist
- Michael Rank (1950-2017), journalist, translator and China and Tibet specialist
