= Danker =

Danker, Dankers, Dancker are similar surnames, which may refer to:

== Danker ==
- Eli Danker (born 1948), Israeli actor
- Frederick William Danker (1920–2012), Greek lexicographer and New Testament scholar
- Jean Danker (born 1978), Singaporean DJ, voiceover artist and actor
- Ran Danker (born 1984), Israeli actor, singer and model, son of Eli
- Tony Danker (born 1971), British businessman

== Dankers ==
- Arne Dankers (born 1980), Canadian speed skater
- Dick Dankers (1950–2018), Dutch furniture designer and gallery owner
- Oskars Dankers (1883–1965), Latvian general

== Dancker ==
- Ed Dancker (1914–1991), American basketball player
- F. W. Dancker (1852–1936), Australian architect and

E. Phillipps Dancker, architect his son
