= Conrad Sulzer Regional Library =

Library in Chicago, Illinois, US

Coordinates: 41°57′46″N 87°41′04″W

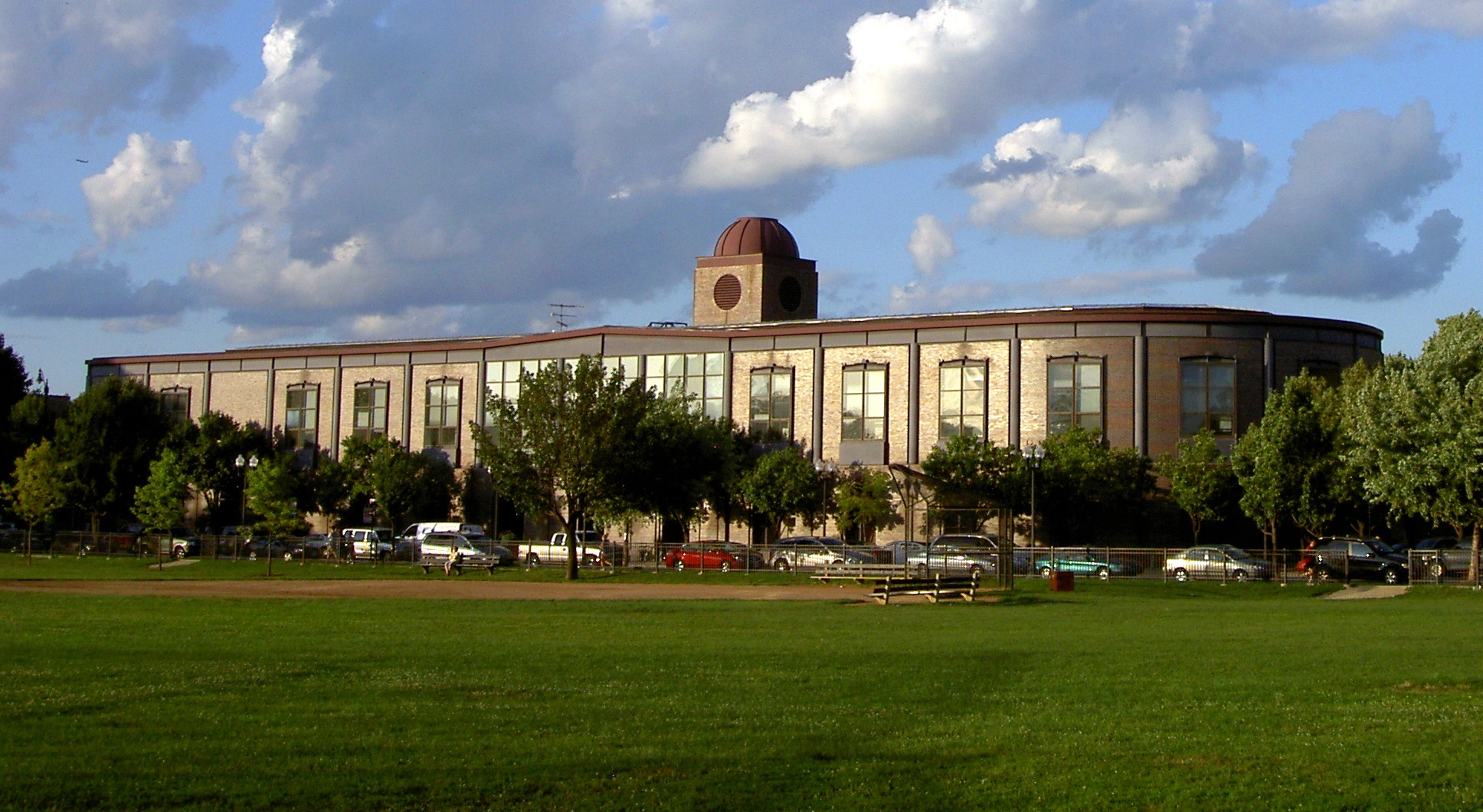
Across from Welles Park

Conrad Sulzer Regional Library is one of three regional libraries in the Chicago Public Library system in Chicago, in the U.S. state of Illinois. It was named for Conrad Sulzer, the first white settler in what became Lakeview Township, whose family held multiple civic posts and established a foundation. The library is located in the Lincoln Square neighborhood at 4455 N. Lincoln Avenue. It is a full-service library and ADA compliant. As with all libraries in the Chicago Public Library system, it has free Wi-Fi internet service.

== Overview ==
The current building was designed in 1985 by the architectural firm of Hammond Beeby and Babka, now known as Hammond Beeby Rupert Ainge, Inc. Lead partner and Driehaus Prize winner, Thomas Hall Beeby (born 1941), was an Oak Park, Illinois, native who also was an associate professor at the Illinois Institute of Technology (1973–1980) and director of the College of Architecture at the University of Illinois Chicago Circle (1980–?). Its German neo-classical style reflects the local Germanic culture of its namesakes, as well as Chicago's noted German-American architect Ludwig Mies van der Rohe. The same firm also designed the Harold Washington Library.

The $5.5 million, 65,000 square feet (6,000 m^{2}) building replaced the Frederick H. Hild Regional Library, named for the second librarian of the Chicago Public Library, who secured its first permanent home (now the Chicago Cultural Center). The Hild Library's 1929 Art-Deco style building (a block away and half the size of its replacement) became a landmark and later a branch of the Old Town School of Folk Music. Alderman Eugene Schulter (47th ward) was instrumental in getting funding and political support for the new library, which opened to the public on September 14, 1985. Much of the library's furniture was custom-made with a German mythological theme.

== Sulzer family ==
Conrad Sulzer (1804-1873) was born in Busenwang, Switzerland, in Thurgau Canton in northeastern Switzerland, the family having lived near Winterthur since before 1300 His father was a local Protestant minister. He studied locally and at Bonn University and Heidelberg University and initially planned to become a doctor or pharmacist. He received an apothecary's certificate in Winterthur, but never actually practiced either career. In 1833 he traveled to France and then the United States, first settling in the Swiss colony in Watertown, New York. He married Christine Young and applied for U.S. citizenship. They had their first child (Frederick) three months before they traveled via a Great Lakes steamboat for the new boom town of Chicago in 1836. The following year Sulzer realized his passion for horticulture and bought 100 acres north of the new town at the intersection of Green Bay Road (that became Clark Street) and what became Irving Park Road. His personal library was the first on Chicago's North Side. Sulzer would sell acreage that became Graceland Cemetery (est. 1859) and to the Ravenswood Land Company (which developed the area beginning in 1868). Many people from Luxemburg fled European turmoil in the 1840s and settled near Sulzer's farm on a ridge above the North Branch of the Chicago River, and also established truck farms to serve the growing city of Chicago. Lake View became the first area developed outside Chicago's city limits, although it would ultimately be annexed.

Both the senior and junior Sulzer held numerous elected local offices. When Lake View township was organized in 1857, Conrad Sulzer was its first assessor (having since 1855 served in that position for the Township of Ridgeville). Before his death in 1892, Frederick was elected Lake View township clerk (beginning in 1867), highway commissioner (1868), town supervisor (1875) and served on the township board of education for 16 years, as well as helped install the area's first water purification plant. His son (Conrad's grandson) Albert Sulzer would graduate from the Massachusetts Institute of Technology and lead the Eastman Kodak Company until his death in 1944. The family's elegant 11-room farmhouse at 4233 N. Greenview Avenue, constructed by Frederick Selzer Jr. in 1886 was still standing in 1988, although sold after the Trinity Seminary and Bible College moved to suburban Bannockburn. A local road was named after Sulzer (renamed "Montrose Avenue" in 1892) as would be a school. The estate of Grace Sulzer established a foundation which provided grants to numerous local organizations.

== Controversies ==
=== Irene Siegel frescoes ===
A controversy erupted just before the library's opening in 1985 concerning a fresco for the community room commissioned from Irene Yarovich Siegel, a recently retired professor at the University of Illinois Chicago Circle. The fresco on the room's four walls depicts Virgil's Aeneid, and also contains passages from writings of Chilean author Pablo Neruda, Greek writer Nikos Kazantzakis and German statesman Johann von Goethe. Community activists complained that the design looked sinister and like graffiti common in the neighborhood, was inappropriate next to the children's section, and that no community advisory panel had been consulted nor provided proposed sketches. While the work was ultimately completed, Siegel dropped out of the local arts scene for a decade. The controversy escalated into a lawsuit and debate over control of public art, and left Siegel burnt out and embittered. The Siegel frescoes were part of a program established in 1978 to provide commissions to Illinois artists. The other artwork commissioned for the building proved less controversial. Sandra Jorgensen painted oil on canvas murals for the Children's Storytelling Room representing views of a bird flying in a garden with a pool with the Chicago skyline in the distance. The auditorium has six large canvases by Nicholas Africano depicting the character Petrushka in the Igor Stravinsky ballet.

=== Book removal ===
In 2001, local residents noticed books being removed from the Sulzer branch; community activists claimed as many as 35,000 books vanished. When Alderman Schulter went to investigate, he was denied entry, as was a Chicago Sun-Times photographer. According to Library Commissioner Mary Dempsey, the alderman was not ordered to leave the library and the book removal was part of standard weeding procedure for older, damaged or less popular books, which a former librarian had neglected to follow. At the time, rumors also circulated that Sulzer Library might be downgraded from a regional library. Then-director Leah Steele had also refused to accept a position at the Harold Washington Library, and was subsequently fired.

As a result of the lawsuit and media exposure, Commissioner Dempsey agreed to form a citizen advisory committee, promised not to remove Sulzer's regional status, and guaranteed continuing Sulzer's Media Center.
