= German American National Congress =

The German American National Congress (German: Deutsch Amerikanischer National Kongress) (also known as DANK) is a national German-American nonprofit organization in the United States founded in 1959. It was established to unite Americans of Germanic descent, while preserving their heritage and traditions. With over 30 chapters and more than 100 associated members throughout the country, DANK is the largest organization of German-Americans.

== History ==
German American National Congress has had relationships with U.S. governmental and civic bodies including the White House, the German Embassy in Washington, D.C., German consulates, and a number of other German organizations, according to its website.

The Holocaust denier Austin App was active with the group, according to the writer Russ Bellant. App died in 1986.

DANK was in the Republican Heritage Groups Council in the early 1970s. The group received some financial support from West Germany. In 1985, its president, Elsbeth Seewald, tried to persuade members of Congress to support President Ronald Reagan's controversial visit to the Bitburg military cemetery, where members of the Nazi Waffen-SS were buried.

In 1987 DANK was involved in the adoption of October 6 as German-American Day, observed nationally.

It launched its website, dank.org, in the late 1990s.

As of 2013, it had 800 members in the United States, according to Multicultural America.

== German-American Journal ==
The German-American Journal is the official newsletter of DANK, published bimonthly. At the start of DANK in 1959 it was six pages, issued every three weeks, and written almost entirely in German. As of 2011, the paper was 16 pages and written primarily in English, with articles in German often accompanied by an English translation or summary. Recurring topics in the Journal include current events, food and entertainment, reviews, and organization news. Members of DANK receive the newspaper as part of membership, and non-members may purchase an annual subscription.

== Organizational structure ==
DANK is made up of chapters throughout the United States, which are divided into three regions: Regions One through Three. Along with its chapters, DANK has its national headquarters (DANK National) at the DANK Haus German American Cultural Center located in Lincoln Square, Chicago, Illinois. On the national and chapter level there are board-member positions which aid in keeping the organization running, and are responsible for organizing events and activities which aim to unite people of German-American descent.
