= Welles Park =

Park in Chicago, Illinois

Coordinates: 41°57′44″N 87°41′11″W

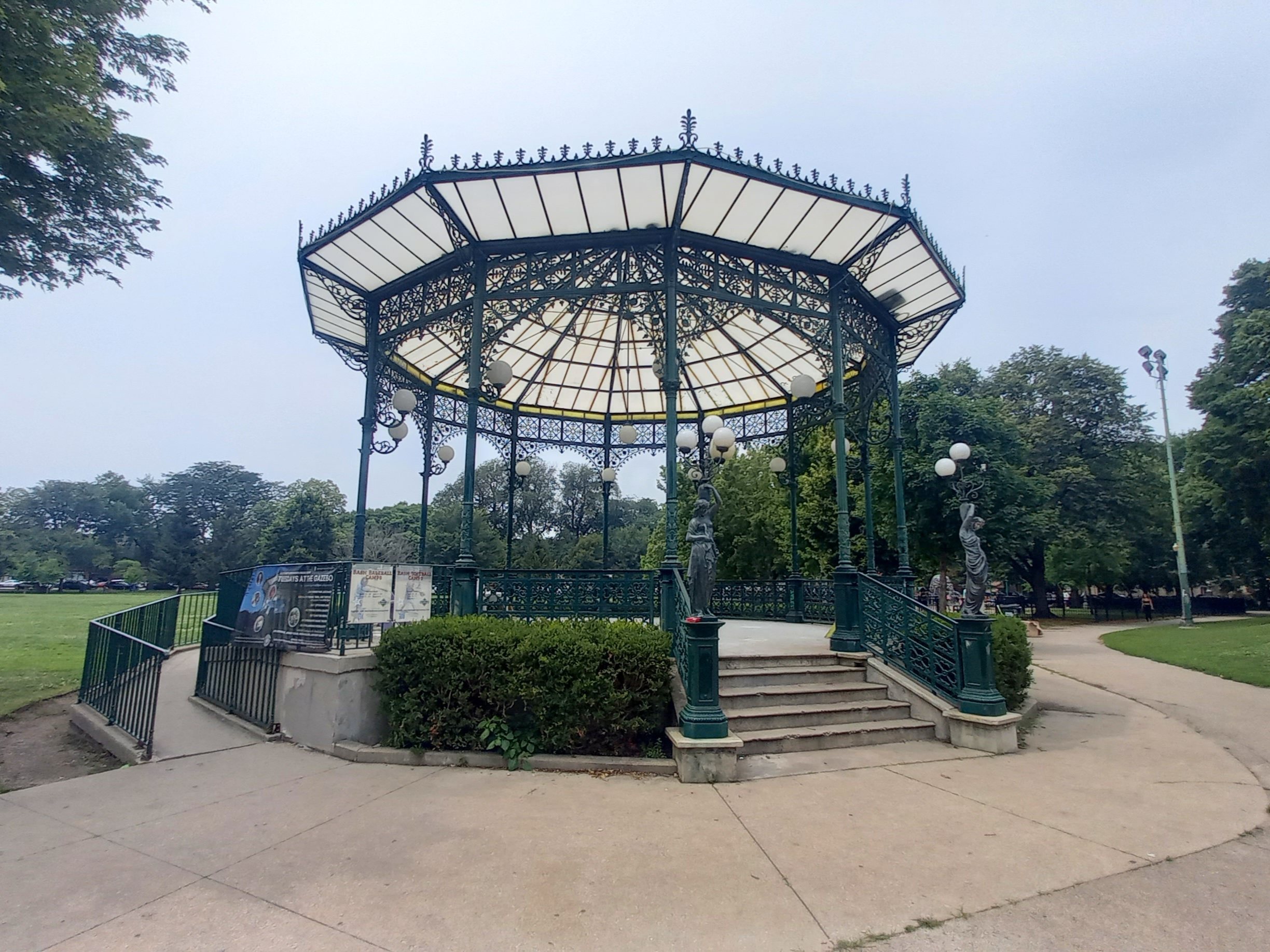
- Gazebo in Welles Park
- Interactive map of Welles Park
- Type: Urban Park
- Location: 2333 W. Sunnyside Avenue, Chicago, IL 60625
- Created: 1910
- Operator: Chicago Park District

Welles Park is a 15.84-acre community park located in the Lincoln Square neighborhood of Chicago, Illinois. The park is one of the five parks created by the Lincoln Park Commission and is named after Gideon Welles. It is part of the City's park system administered by the Chicago Park District, and serves as a prominent recreational, cultural, and historical space on the city's North Side. The Welles Park Advisory Council, a volunteer community organization, helps manage and support the park.

== Overview ==
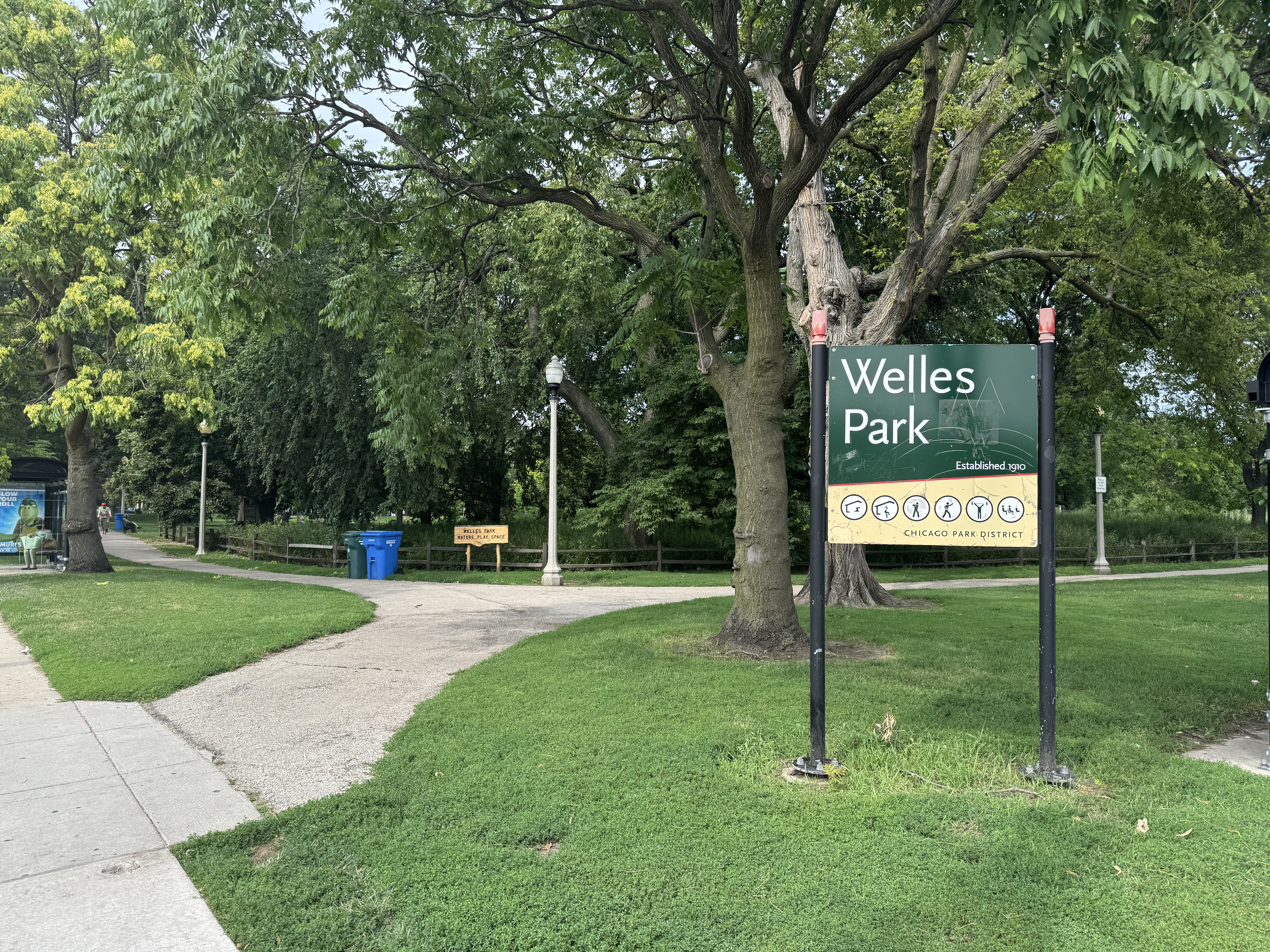
Entrance to Welles Park

Welles Park is situated at 2333 W. Sunnyside Avenue, Chicago, IL 60625, at the intersection of Lincoln Avenue and Montrose Avenue. Open daily from 6:00 am to 11:00 pm, the park offers a wide variety of indoor and outdoor recreational amenities and hosts programs for residents of all ages and abilities.

The Welles Park Fieldhouse, open daily from 7:00 am to 9:30 pm, houses an indoor swimming pool, fitness center, and multipurpose rooms used for youth programs, after-school arts and crafts, and community events.

== History ==
Welles Park was established in 1910 by the Lincoln Park Commission, one of five parks created under a broader initiative to bring neighborhood parks to the city's north side, modeled after recent developments on Chicago's south and west sides. It is named after Gideon Welles, who served as U.S. Secretary of the Navy under President Abraham Lincoln from 1861 to 1869.

Initially developed on an 8-acre site, the park expanded in the 1920s through leased land and various acquisitions. In 1934, with the consolidation of Chicago's 22 independent park commissions into the Chicago Park District, Welles Park became part of the unified city park system. Further land acquisitions occurred in 1942 and in 1957, the latter through the Chicago Park and the Chicago Park and City Exchange of Functions Act.

In the 1920s, Welles Park's original fieldhouse played a formative role in the early career of Abe Saperstein, the Chicago native who later founded the Harlem Globetrotters. Beginning as a basketball coach at Welles park, Saperstein went on to manage and promote the team nationally.

== Facilities and Programs ==
Welles Park provides a wide range of facilities and programming, including a public indoor heated pool, a fitness center, tennis and pickleball courts, baseball and softball fields, nature parks, open green space, and an ADA-accessible playground area. The park also has one of the eleven historical horseshoe pits in the city, established in 1930. The pickleball courts were added in 2024 to kickstart the Chicago Park District's "Pickleball Mania" funding and improvement plan, to capitalize on the current trends of pickleball popularity in America.

Community programs offered at the park include youth soccer, baseball and softball leagues, floor hockey, tumbling, arts and crafts, after-school programs, competitive swimming, aqua exercise classes, and therapeutic recreation programs for children and adults with disabilities. Weekly bird-watching walks are hosted by members of the Chicago Ornithological Society.

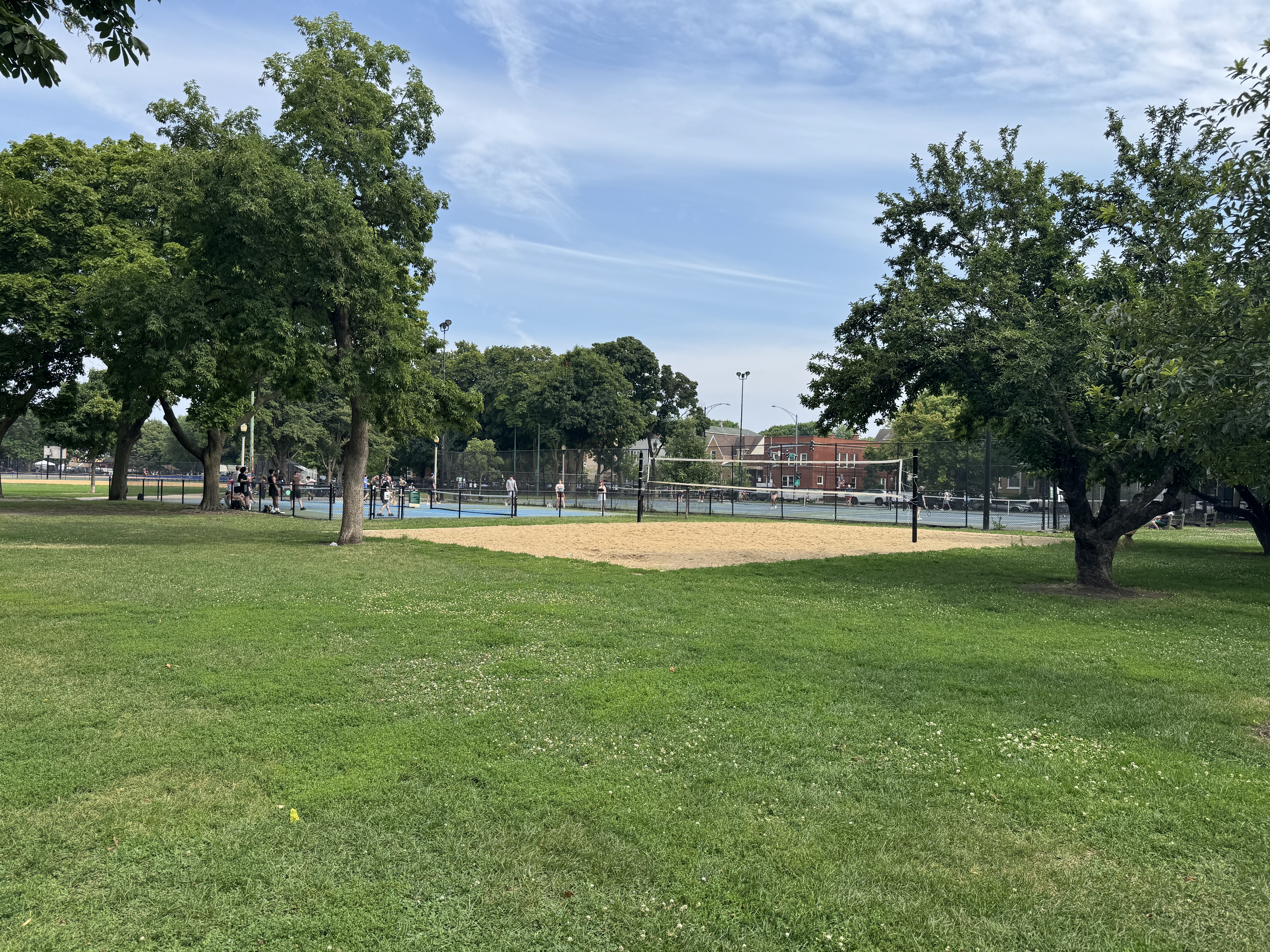
Volleyball, Pickleball, and Tennis Courts at Welles Park

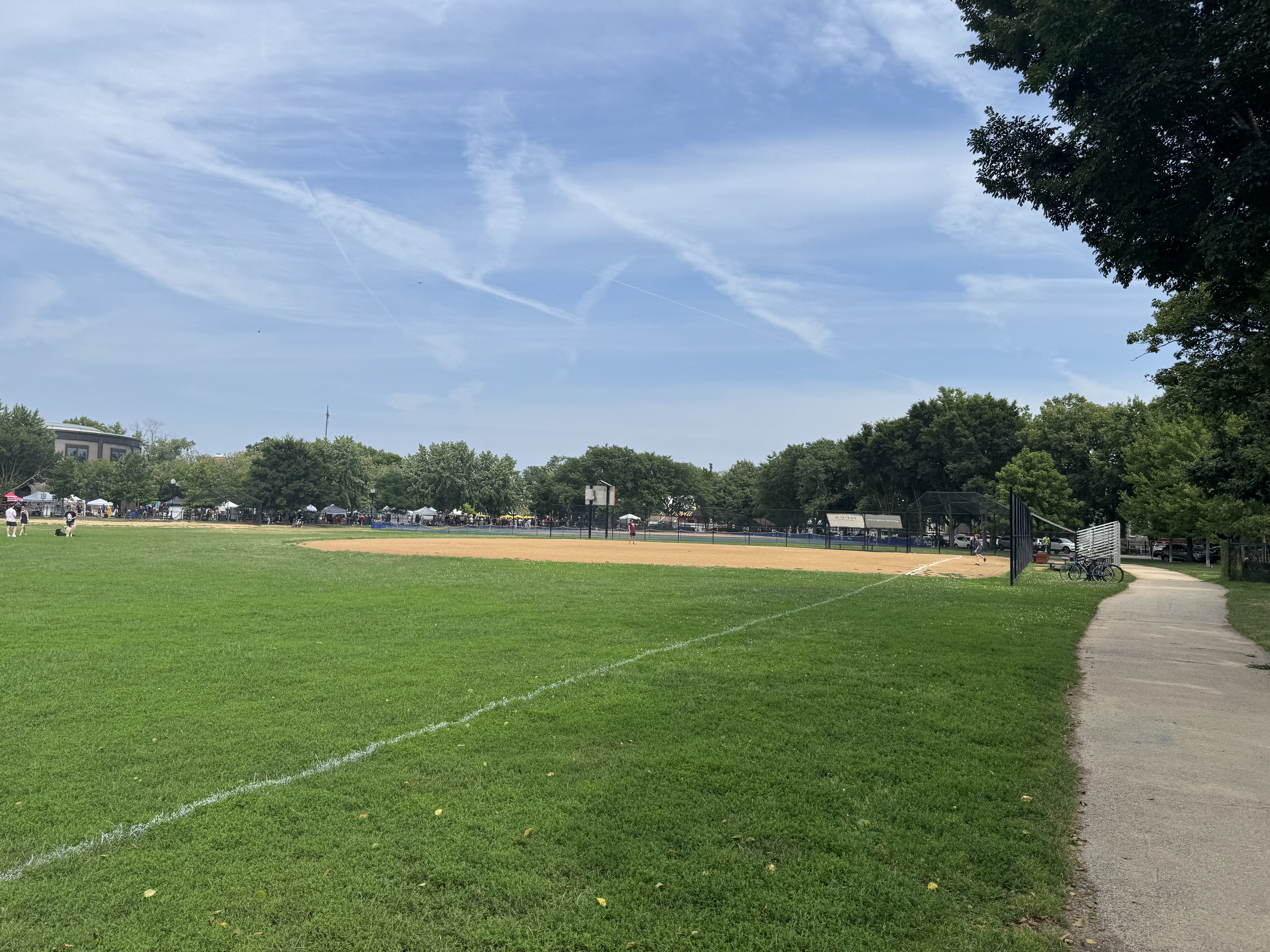
Baseball Field at Welles Park

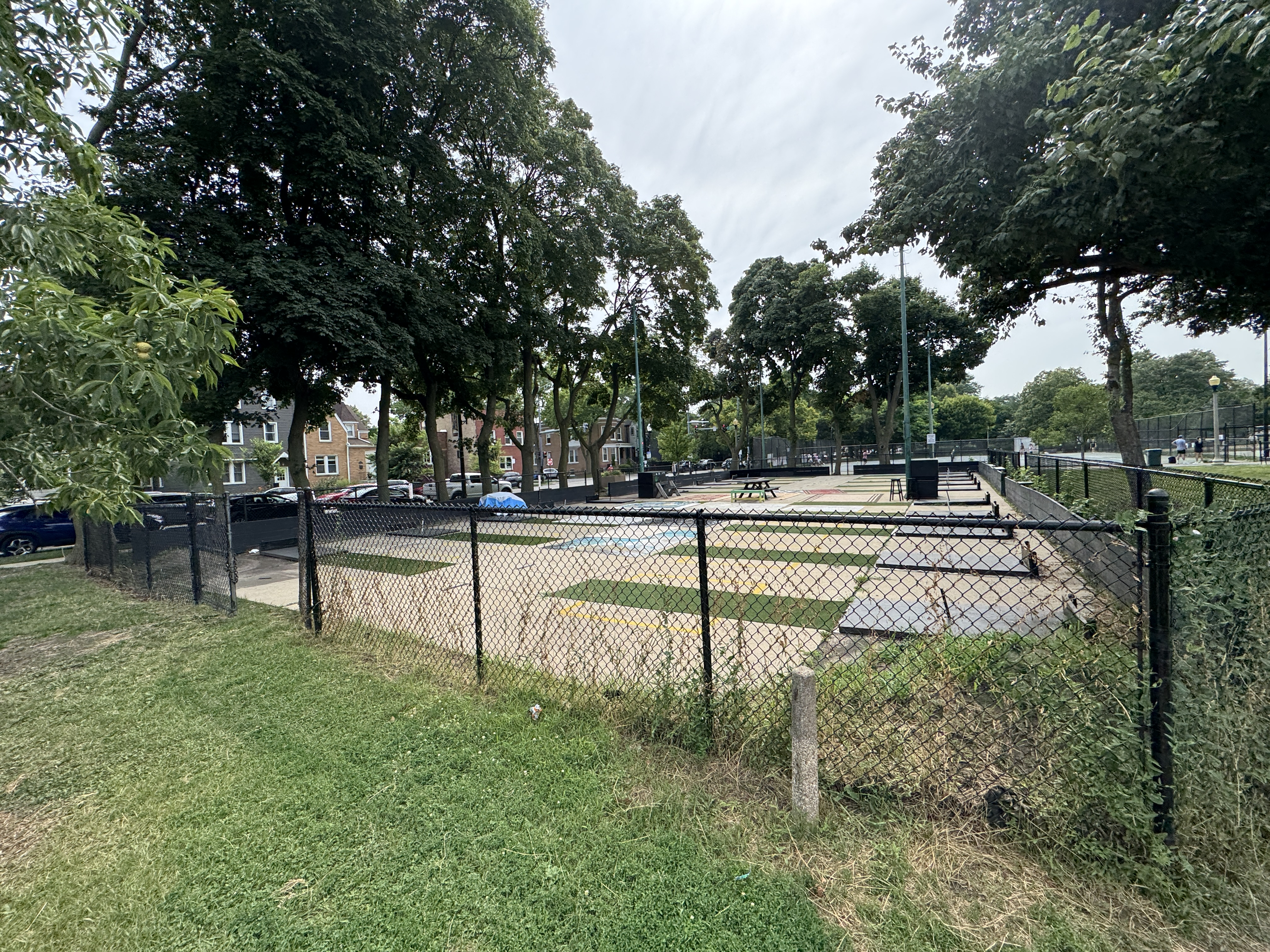
Horseshoe Pit at Welles Park

A prominent feature is the European-style wrought iron gazebo on the park’s west side, used as a performance venue for concerts and community gatherings. The structure is wired for electricity, supporting lighting and sound equipment, frequently used for the park's Tuesdays at the Gazebo concert series taking place annually since 1994.

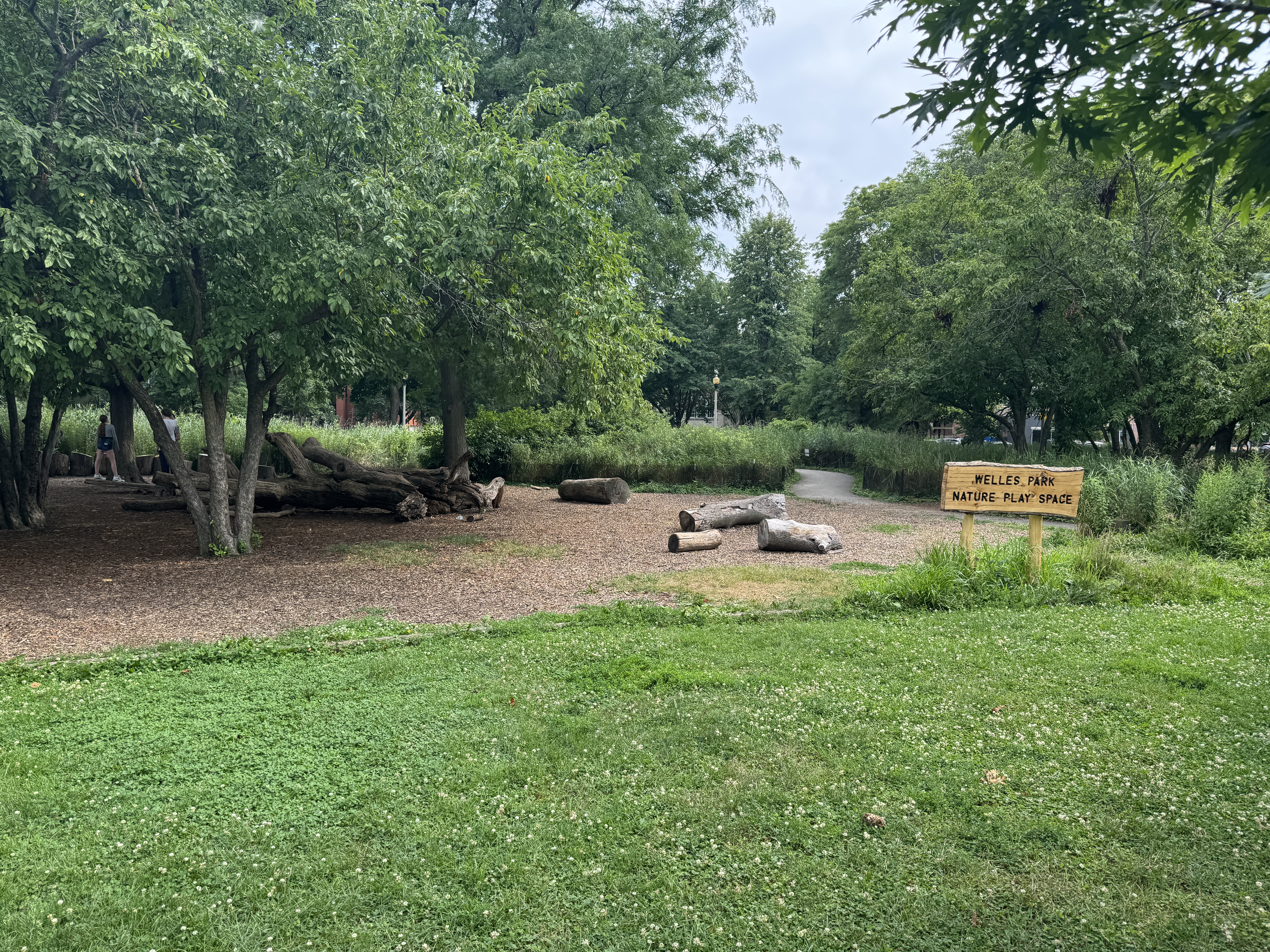
NaturePlace natural playground at Welles Park

The park includes a unique natural playground near the south entrance of the park, entitled the "NaturePlace". This 1-acre playground was a crowd-funded project to create a natural playground with sticks, rocks, logs, and other organic materials for children to discover and build with. The National Recreation and Park Association, in collaboration with the Walt Disney Company, awarded the NaturePlace the Meet Me at the Park 2017 Award, with a prize of $20,000.
