= Sharon Gamson Danks =

- Education: Princeton, BA 1993; Berkeley MA, 2000
- Occupation: City planner
- Years active: 16+
- Known for: Asphalt to Ecosystems
- Awards: ASLA 2012; Ashoka Fellow (2017)
- Website: www.greenschoolyards.org

Sharon Gamson Danks is an American environmental planner and landscape designer known for her advocacy of environmentally friendly schoolyards. In 2013, she founded the nonprofit Green Schoolyards America to promote ecologically healthy city schoolyards. She designed outdoor playgrounds with blooming gardens, shaded ponds and nature trails. Her book Asphalt to Ecosystems: Design Ideas for Schoolyard Transformation describes ways to transform the "traditional school ground’s slab of asphalt into edible gardens" and it received an American Society of Landscape Architects award in 2012.

In May 2020, during the COVID-19 pandemic, Danks, along with Green Schoolyards America and several other organizations, founded the National COVID-19 Outdoor Learning Initiative to help American K-12 schools move into fresh air spaces to reduce virus transmission. She helped create an online resource called the National Outdoor Learning Library to help educators plan their outdoor learning efforts. The online library features templates for constructing outdoor classroom spaces and lesson plans.

She is based in the San Francisco Bay Area.

== Publications ==
- Asphalt to Ecosystems: Design Ideas for Schoolyard Transformation, New Village Press (November 1, 2010)
