= National Register of Historic Places listings in Evanston, Illinois =

This is a list of the 62 National Register of Historic Places listings in Evanston, Illinois.

== Current listings ==
	Name on the Register	Image	Date listed	Location	City or town	Description
1	Andridge Apartments	Andridge Apartments	March 15, 1984 (#84000927)	1627–1645 Ridge Ave., 1124–1136 Church St. 42°02′54″N 87°41′19″W		
2	Building at 1101–1113 Maple Avenue	Building at 1101–1113 Maple Avenue	March 15, 1984 (#84000960)	1101–1113 Maple Ave. 42°02′17″N 87°41′06″W		
3	Building at 1209–1217 Maple Avenue	Building at 1209–1217 Maple Avenue	March 15, 1984 (#84000964)	1209–1217 Maple Ave. 42°02′24″N 87°41′06″W		
4	Building at 1301–1303 Judson Avenue	Building at 1301–1303 Judson Avenue	April 27, 1984 (#84000968)	1301–1303 Judson Ave. 42°02′29″N 87°40′36″W		
5	Building at 1305–1307 Judson Avenue	Building at 1305–1307 Judson Avenue	April 27, 1984 (#84000966)	1305–1307 Judson Ave. 42°02′30″N 87°40′37″W		
6	Building at 1316 Maple Avenue	Building at 1316 Maple Avenue	March 15, 1984 (#84000969)	1316 Maple Ave. 42°02′31″N 87°41′09″W		
7	Building at 1401–1407 Elmwood Avenue	Building at 1401–1407 Elmwood Avenue	March 15, 1984 (#84000973)	1401–1407 Elmwood Ave. 42°02′35″N 87°41′00″W		
8	Building at 1505–1509 Oak Avenue	Building at 1505–1509 Oak Avenue	March 15, 1984 (#84000976)	1505–1509 Oak Ave. 42°02′43″N 87°41′12″W		
9	Building at 1929–1931 Sherman Avenue	Building at 1929–1931 Sherman Avenue	March 15, 1984 (#84000978)	1929–1931 Sherman Ave. 42°03′12″N 87°40′54″W		
10	Building at 2517 Central Street	Building at 2517 Central Street	March 15, 1984 (#84000980)	2517 Central St. 42°03′53″N 87°42′31″W		
11	Building at 2519 Central Street	Building at 2519 Central Street	March 15, 1984 (#84000982)	2519 Central St. 42°03′53″N 87°42′33″W		
12	Building at 2523 Central Street	Building at 2523 Central Street	March 15, 1984 (#84000983)	2523 Central St. 42°03′53″N 87°42′35″W		
13	Building at 417–419 Lee Street	Building at 417–419 Lee Street	March 15, 1984 (#84000942)	417–419 Lee St. 42°02′10″N 87°40′39″W		
14	Building at 548–606 Michigan Avenue	Building at 548–606 Michigan Avenue	March 15, 1984 (#84000945)	548–606 Michigan Ave. 42°01′43″N 87°40′21″W		
15	Building at 813–815 Forest Avenue	Building at 813–815 Forest Avenue	March 15, 1984 (#84000950)	813–815 Forest Ave. 42°01′58″N 87°40′26″W		
16	Building at 923–925 Michigan Avenue	Building at 923–925 Michigan Avenue	March 15, 1984 (#84000953)	923–925 Michigan Ave. 42°02′05″N 87°40′23″W		
17	Building at 999 Michigan, 200 Lee	Building at 999 Michigan, 200 Lee	March 15, 1984 (#84000958)	999 Michigan Ave., 200 Lee St. 42°02′08″N 87°40′24″W		
18	Buildings at 1104–1110 Seward	Buildings at 1104–1110 Seward	September 2, 1986 (#86001743)	1104–1110 Seward; 42°01′44″N 87°41′16″W		
19	Buildings at 815–817 Brummel and 819–821 Brummel	Buildings at 815–817 Brummel and 819–821 Brummel	March 15, 1984 (#84000952)	815–817, and 819–821 Brummel St. 42°01′17″N 87°41′04″W		
20	Frederick B. Carter, Jr. House	Frederick B. Carter, Jr. House	July 30, 1974 (#74000758)	1024 Judson Ave. 42°02′11″N 87°40′37″W		1910 Prairie School style house, designed by Walter Burley Griffin.
21	Castle Tower Apartments	Castle Tower Apartments	March 15, 1984 (#84000985)	2212-2226 Sherman Ave. 42°03′30″N 87°40′56″W		
22	Colonnade Court	Colonnade Court	March 15, 1984 (#84000987)	501-507 Main St., 904-908 Hinman Ave. 42°02′06″N 87°40′43″W		
23	Charles Gates Dawes House	Charles Gates Dawes House	December 8, 1976 (#76000706)	225 Greenwood St. 42°02′35″N 87°40′25″W		Home of the Evanston History Center
24	George B. Dryden House	George B. Dryden House	December 18, 1978 (#78001135)	1314 Ridge Ave. 42°02′30″N 87°41′21″W		
25	Evanston Lakeshore Historic District	Evanston Lakeshore Historic District	September 29, 1980 (#80001353)	Roughly bounded by Northwestern University, Lake Michigan, Calvary Cemetery, and Chicago Ave. 42°02′15″N 87°40′30″W		
26	Evanston Ridge Historic District	Evanston Ridge Historic District	March 3, 1983 (#83000309)	Roughly bounded by Main, Asbury, Ashland, Emerson, Ridge Ave and Maple Ave. 42°02′35″N 87°41′21″W		
27	Evanston Towers	Evanston Towers	March 15, 1984 (#84000990)	554-602 Sheridan Sq. 42°01′43″N 87°40′10″W		
28	The Forest and Annex	The Forest and Annex	March 15, 1984 (#84000991)	901-905 Forest Ave. 42°02′02″N 87°40′27″W		
29	Fountain Plaza Apartments	Fountain Plaza Apartments	March 15, 1984 (#84000992)	830-856 Hinman Ave. 42°02′00″N 87°40′42″W		
30	The Greenwood	The Greenwood	March 15, 1984 (#84000993)	425 Greenwood St. 42°02′35″N 87°40′44″W		
31	Grosse Point Light Station	Grosse Point Light Station	September 8, 1976 (#76000707)	2601 Sheridan Rd. 42°03′50″N 87°40′34″W		
32	Hillcrest Apartment	Hillcrest Apartment	March 15, 1984 (#84000994)	1509-1515 Hinman Ave. 42°02′42″N 87°40′41″W		
33	Hinman Apartments	Hinman Apartments	March 15, 1984 (#84000995)	1629-1631 Hinman Ave. 42°02′48″N 87°40′39″W		
34	The Homestead	The Homestead	February 1, 2006 (#05001607)	1625 Hinman Ave. 42°02′48″N 87°40′38″W		
35	James B. Irving House		February 5, 2021 (#100006102)	2771 Crawford Ave. 42°04′08″N 87°43′50″W		
36	The Judson	The Judson	March 15, 1984 (#84000998)	1243-1249 Judson Ave. 42°02′27″N 87°40′35″W		
37	Lake Shore Apartments	Lake Shore Apartments	March 15, 1984 (#84001000)	470-498 Sheridan Rd. 42°01′37″N 87°40′07″W		
38	Maple Court Apartments	Maple Court Apartments	March 15, 1984 (#84001013)	1115-1133 Maple Ave. 42°02′20″N 87°41′06″W		
39	Marywood Academy	Marywood Academy	February 9, 2006 (#06000007)	2100 Ridge Ave. 42°03′24″N 87°41′14″W		A former Catholic girls school which is now home to the Evanston Civic Center
40	Melwood Apartments	Melwood Apartments	March 15, 1984 (#84001016)	1201-1213 Michigan Ave. and 205-207 Hamilton St. 42°02′22″N 87°40′24″W		
41	Michigan-Lee Apartments	Michigan-Lee Apartments	March 15, 1984 (#84001018)	940-950 Michigan Ave. 42°02′07″N 87°40′26″W		
42	Northeast Evanston Historic District	Northeast Evanston Historic District	August 12, 1999 (#99000979)	Roughly bounded by Emerson St., Sherman Ave., Sheridan Pl., Lake Michigan, Sheridan Rd., and Orrington Ave. 42°03′40″N 87°40′47″W		
43	Oak Ridge Apartments	Oak Ridge Apartments	March 15, 1984 (#84001025)	1615-1625 Ridge Ave. 42°02′51″N 87°41′19″W		
44	Oakton Gables	Oakton Gables	March 15, 1984 (#84001024)	900-910 Oakton St. and 439-445 Ridge Ave. 42°01′35″N 87°41′07″W		
45	Oakton Historic District	Oakton Historic District	May 23, 2005 (#05000106)	Roughly bounded by Oakton St., Howard St., Ridge Ave., and Asbury Ave. 42°01′31″N 87°41′15″W		
46	Dwight Perkins House	Dwight Perkins House	August 29, 1985 (#85001908)	2319 Lincoln St. 42°03′44″N 87°42′47″W		
47	Raymond Park Apartments	Raymond Park Apartments	April 12, 2002 (#85003581)	1501 Hinman Ave. and 425 Grove St. 42°02′41″N 87°40′42″W		
48	Ridge Boulevard Apartments	Ridge Boulevard Apartments	March 15, 1984 (#84001028)	843-849 Ridge Ave. and 1014-1020 Main St. 42°02′02″N 87°41′12″W		
49	Ridge Grove	Ridge Grove	March 15, 1984 (#84001030)	1112 Grove St. 42°02′43″N 87°41′16″W		
50	Ridge Manor	Ridge Manor	March 15, 1984 (#84001034)	1603-1611 Ridge Ave. and 1125 Davis St. 42°02′51″N 87°41′19″W		
51	Ridgewood	Ridgewood	October 4, 1978 (#78001136)	1703-1713 Ridge Ave. 42°02′56″N 87°41′18″W		
52	Rookwood Apartments	Rookwood Apartments	March 15, 1984 (#84001043)	718-734 Noyes St. 42°03′30″N 87°40′53″W		
53	Roycemore School	Roycemore School	August 3, 1987 (#87001256)	640 Lincoln St. 42°03′41″N 87°40′44″W		
54	Shakespeare Garden	Shakespeare Garden	November 16, 1988 (#88002234)	Northwestern University campus 42°03′24″N 87°40′34″W		
55	Sheridan Square Apartments	Sheridan Square Apartments	March 15, 1984 (#84001050)	620-638 Sheridan Sq. 42°01′44″N 87°40′11″W		
56	Stoneleigh Manor	Stoneleigh Manor	March 15, 1984 (#84001057)	904-906 Michigan Ave. and 227-229 Main St. 42°02′02″N 87°40′25″W		
57	Tudor Manor	Tudor Manor	March 15, 1984 (#84001058)	524 Sheridan Sq. 42°01′39″N 87°40′09″W		
58	Edward Kirk Warren House and Garage	Edward Kirk Warren House and Garage	January 30, 1986 (#86000136)	2829 and 2831 Sheridan Pl. 42°04′10″N 87°40′46″W		
59	Westminster	Westminster	March 15, 1984 (#84001061)	632-640 Hinman Ave. 42°01′47″N 87°40′39″W		
60	Frances Willard House	Frances Willard House	October 15, 1966 (#66000318)	1730 Chicago Ave. 42°02′54″N 87°40′45″W		
61	Woman's Christian Temperance Union Administration Building	Woman's Christian Temperance Union Administration Building	August 13, 2002 (#02000849)	1730R Chicago Ave. 42°02′56″N 87°40′45″W		
62	Woman's Club of Evanston	Woman's Club of Evanston	November 9, 2006 (#06001020)	1702 Chicago Ave. 42°02′53″N 87°40′45″W		
