= Building at 1316 Maple Avenue =

- U.S. National Register of Historic Places
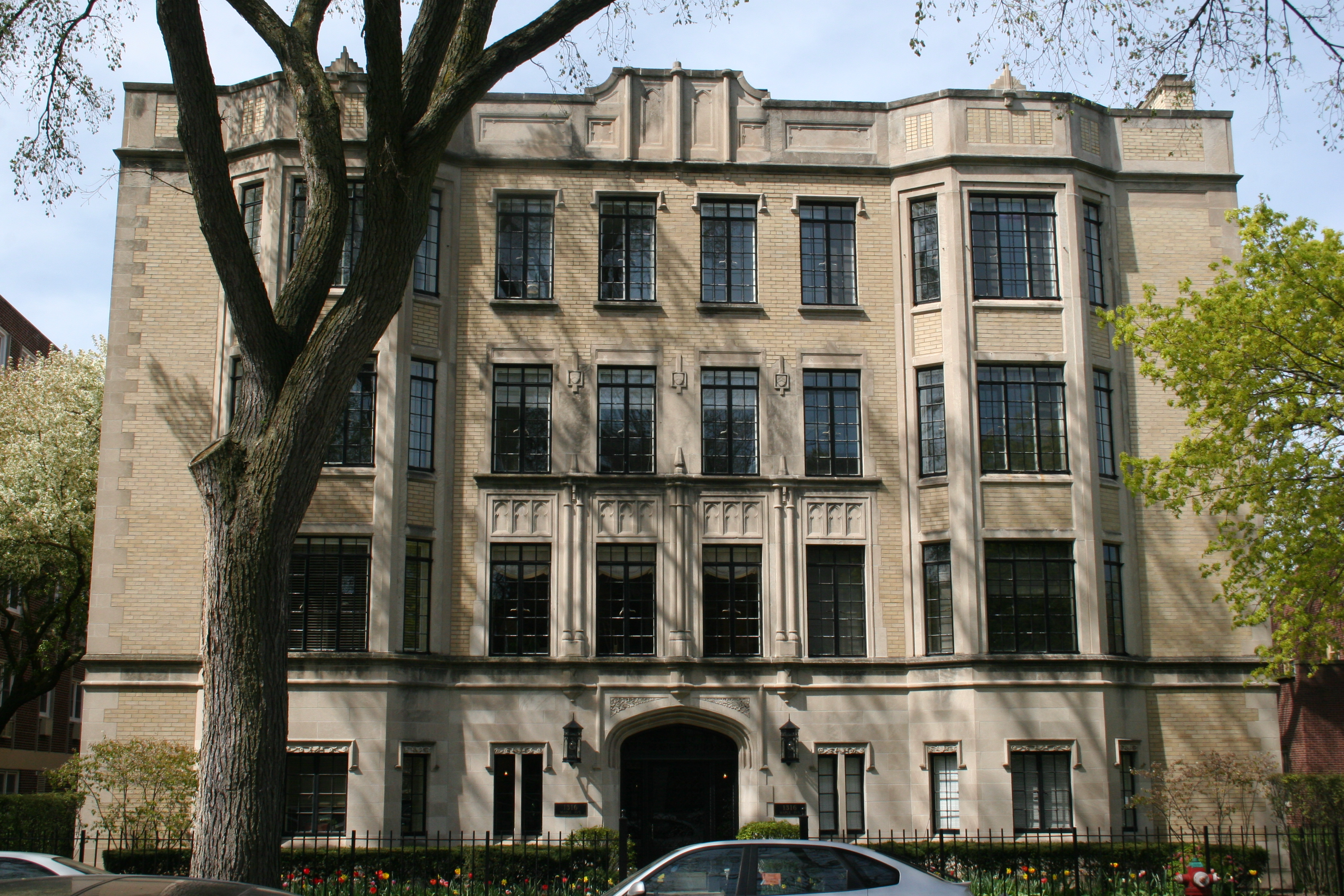
- Building at 1316 Maple Ave. in 2012

- Location within Chicago metropolitan area Location within Illinois Location within the United States
- Location: 1316 Maple Ave., Evanston, Illinois
- Coordinates: 42°02′31″N 87°41′09″W
- Area: 0.5 acres (0.20 ha)
- Built: 1928
- Architect: Edward M. Sieja
- Architectural style: Tudor Revival
- MPS: Suburban Apartment Buildings in Evanston TR
- NRHP reference No.: 84000969
- Added to NRHP: March 15, 1984

The Building at 1316 Maple Avenue is a historic apartment building at 1316 Maple Avenue in Evanston, Illinois. The three-story cream brick building was built in 1928. Architect Edward M. Sieja designed the building in the Tudor Revival style. The building's design includes limestone quoins, projecting bays, casement windows, and a parapet at the roof. The building's lobby features wooden ceiling beams and a mosaic tile floor, giving it the appearance of a castle's great hall.

The building was added to the National Register of Historic Places on March 15, 1984.
