= Building at 1101–1113 Maple Avenue =

- U.S. National Register of Historic Places
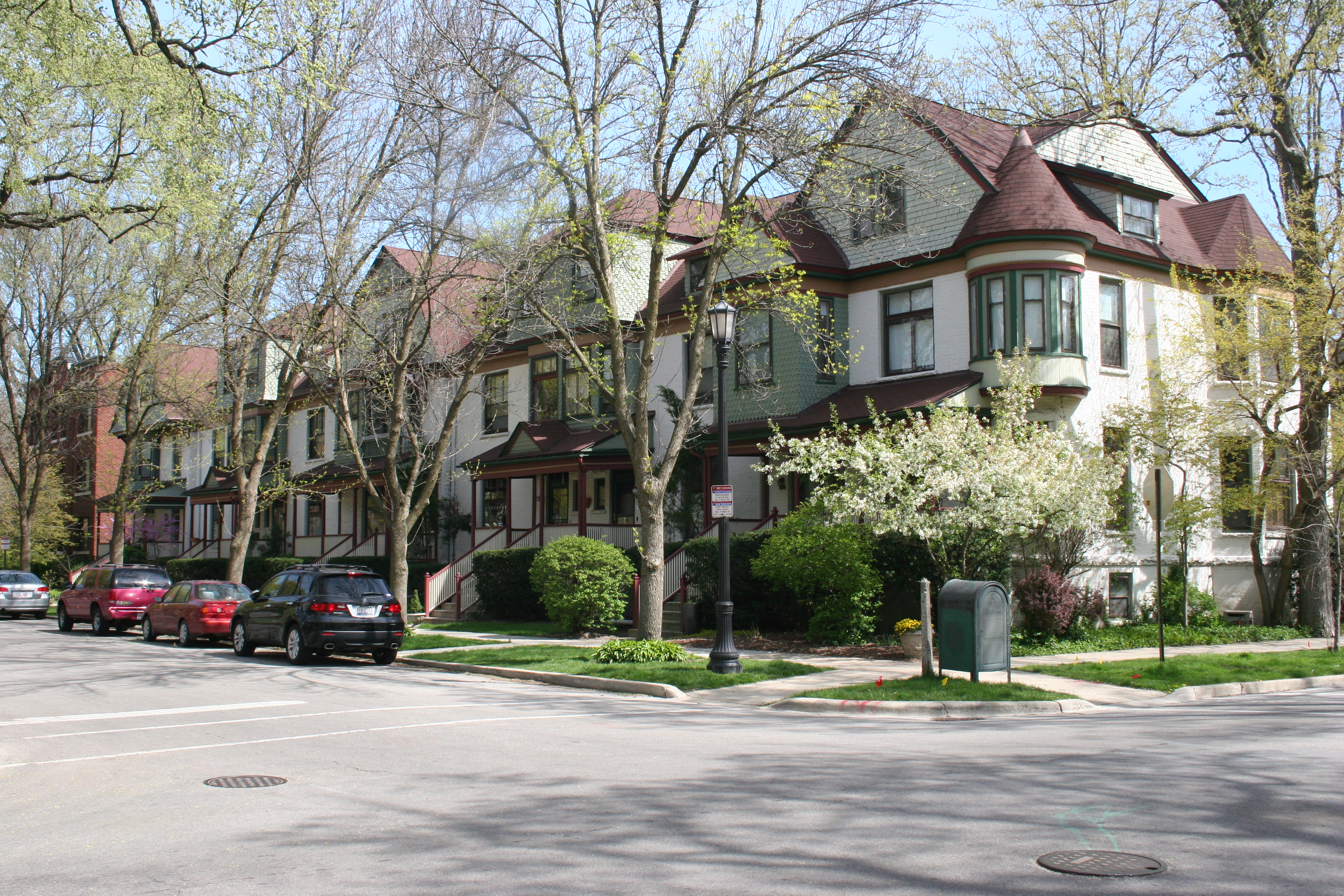

- Location within Chicago metropolitan area Location within Illinois Location within the United States
- Location: 1101–1113 Maple Ave., Evanston, Illinois
- Coordinates: 42°02′17″N 87°41′06″W
- Area: 0.4 acres (0.16 ha)
- Built: 1892
- Architect: S.H. Warner
- Architectural style: Queen Anne
- MPS: Suburban Apartment Buildings in Evanston TR
- NRHP reference No.: 84000960
- Added to NRHP: March 15, 1984

The Building at 1101–1113 Maple Avenue is a historic rowhouse building in Evanston, Illinois. Built in 1892, the three-story building includes seven attached rowhouses. Late nineteenth century rowhouses such as this were precursors to Evanston's suburban apartment buildings of the early twentieth century, which also offered house-like living in a multi-family setting. Architect S.H. Warner designed the building in the Queen Anne style. The building's design includes gambrel porch roofs, projecting bays, patterned shingle siding, and a corner turret.

The building was added to the National Register of Historic Places on March 15, 1984.
