= Oakton Historic District =

Historic district in Illinois, US

- U.S. National Register of Historic Places
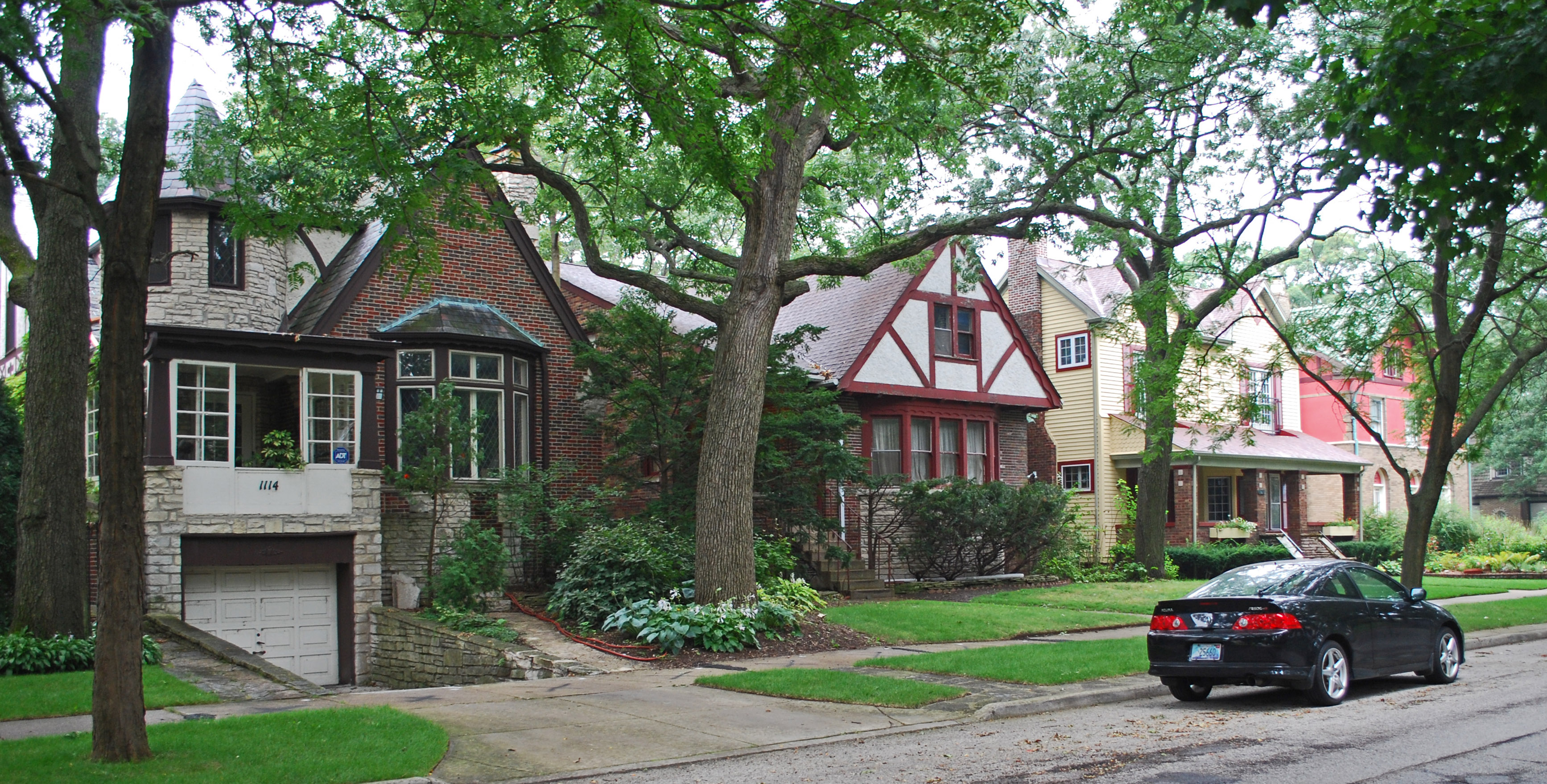

- Location within Chicago metropolitan area Location within Illinois Location within the United States
- Location: Roughly bounded by Oakton St., Howard St., Ridge Ave., and Asbury Ave., Evanston, Illinois
- Coordinates: 42°01′31″N 87°41′15″W
- Area: 55.6 acres (22.5 ha)
- NRHP reference No.: 05000106
- Added to NRHP: May 23, 2005

The Oakton Historic District is a residential historic district in south central Evanston, Illinois. The district includes 203 contributing buildings, most of which were developed between 1913 and 1940. Development on Evanston's lakeshore began in the mid-nineteenth century, but the land that became the district was part of a large farm owned by the Mulford family at the time; once the family had sold most of its land, the area was platted in 1890. Most of the residences in the district are single-family houses, a product of Evanston's early zoning laws. The houses reflect the popular architectural trends of the early twentieth century; the Tudor Revival, Colonial Revival, and American Craftsman styles are most common.

The district was added to the National Register of Historic Places on May 23, 2005.
