= Building at 813–815 Forest Avenue =

- U.S. National Register of Historic Places
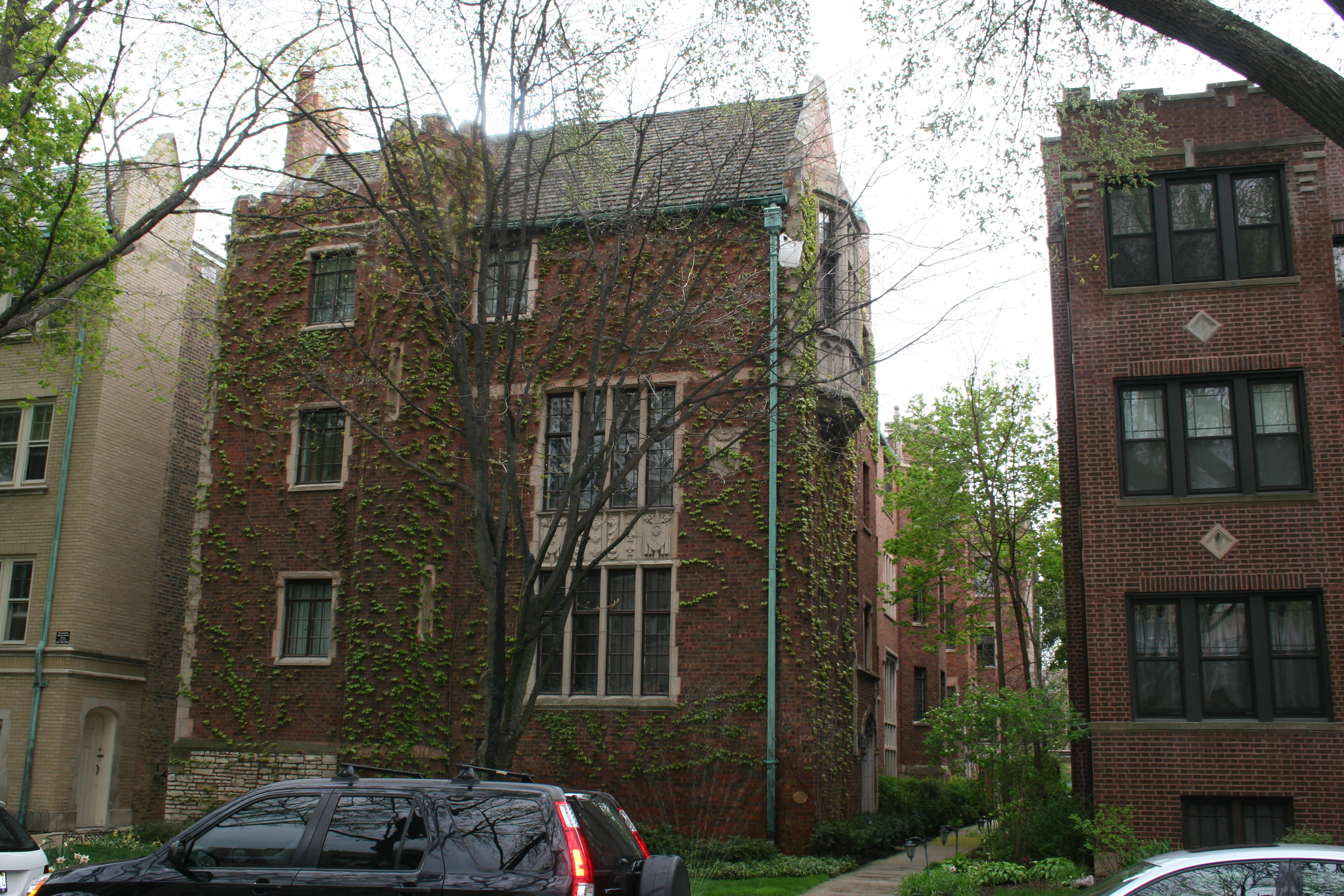
- Building at 813–815 Forest Ave. in 2012

- Location within Chicago metropolitan area Location within Illinois Location within the United States
- Location: 813–815 Forest Ave., Evanston, Illinois
- Coordinates: 42°01′58″N 87°40′26″W
- Area: 0.2 acres (0.081 ha)
- Built: 1929
- Architect: Jens J. Jensen
- Architectural style: Tudor Revival
- MPS: Suburban Apartment Buildings in Evanston TR
- NRHP reference No.: 84000950
- Added to NRHP: March 15, 1984

The Building at 813–815 Forest Avenue is a historic apartment building in Evanston, Illinois. The three-story brick building was built in 1929. The building has an L-shaped layout with a half courtyard, a relatively common pattern among Evanston's apartments. Architect Jens J. Jensen designed the building in the Tudor Revival style, a popular choice for the time. The building's design includes Tudor arched entrances, lancet windows, projecting bays, and a crenellated tower.

The building was added to the National Register of Historic Places on March 15, 1984.
