= Ridge Boulevard Apartments =

- U.S. National Register of Historic Places
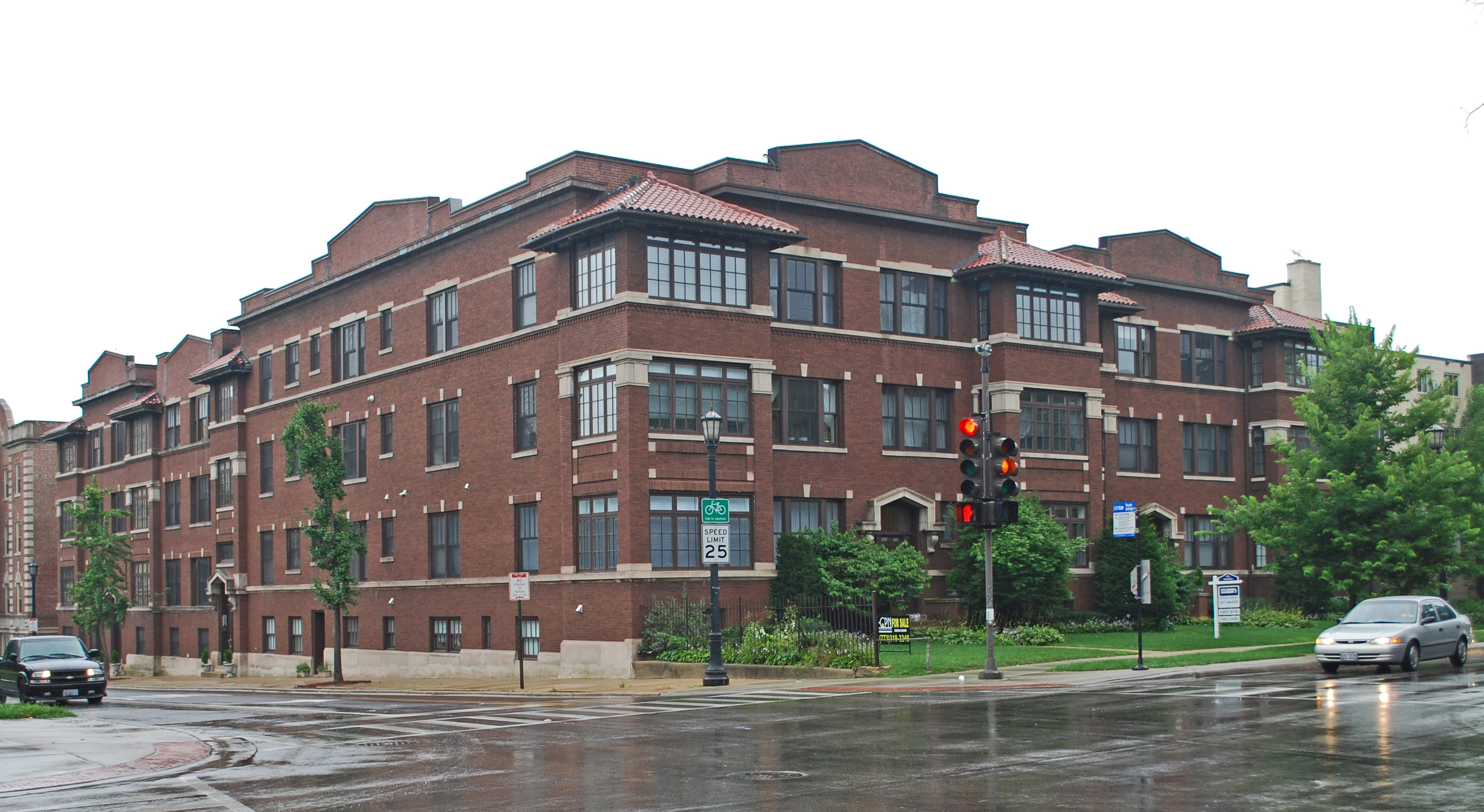
- Ridge Boulevard Apartments in 2010

- Location within Chicago metropolitan area Location within Illinois Location within the United States
- Location: 843-849 Ridge Ave. and 1014-1020 Main St., Evanston, Illinois
- Coordinates: 42°02′02″N 87°41′12″W
- Area: 0.5 acres (0.20 ha)
- Built: 1913
- Architect: Thomas McCall
- MPS: Suburban Apartment Buildings in Evanston TR
- NRHP reference No.: 84001028
- Added to NRHP: March 15, 1984

Ridge Boulevard Apartments is a historic apartment building at the southeast corner of Ridge Avenue and Main Street in Evanston, Illinois. The three-story brick building was built in 1913. Owner Thomas McCall, who was also an architect, designed the building. McCall's design included miter arched entrances, bay windows, stone banding, and a rear courtyard. The twenty-one apartments in the building featured amenities such as sun porches, servants' rooms, and fireplaces in the larger units.

The building was added to the National Register of Historic Places on March 15, 1984.
