= Ridge Grove =

- U.S. National Register of Historic Places
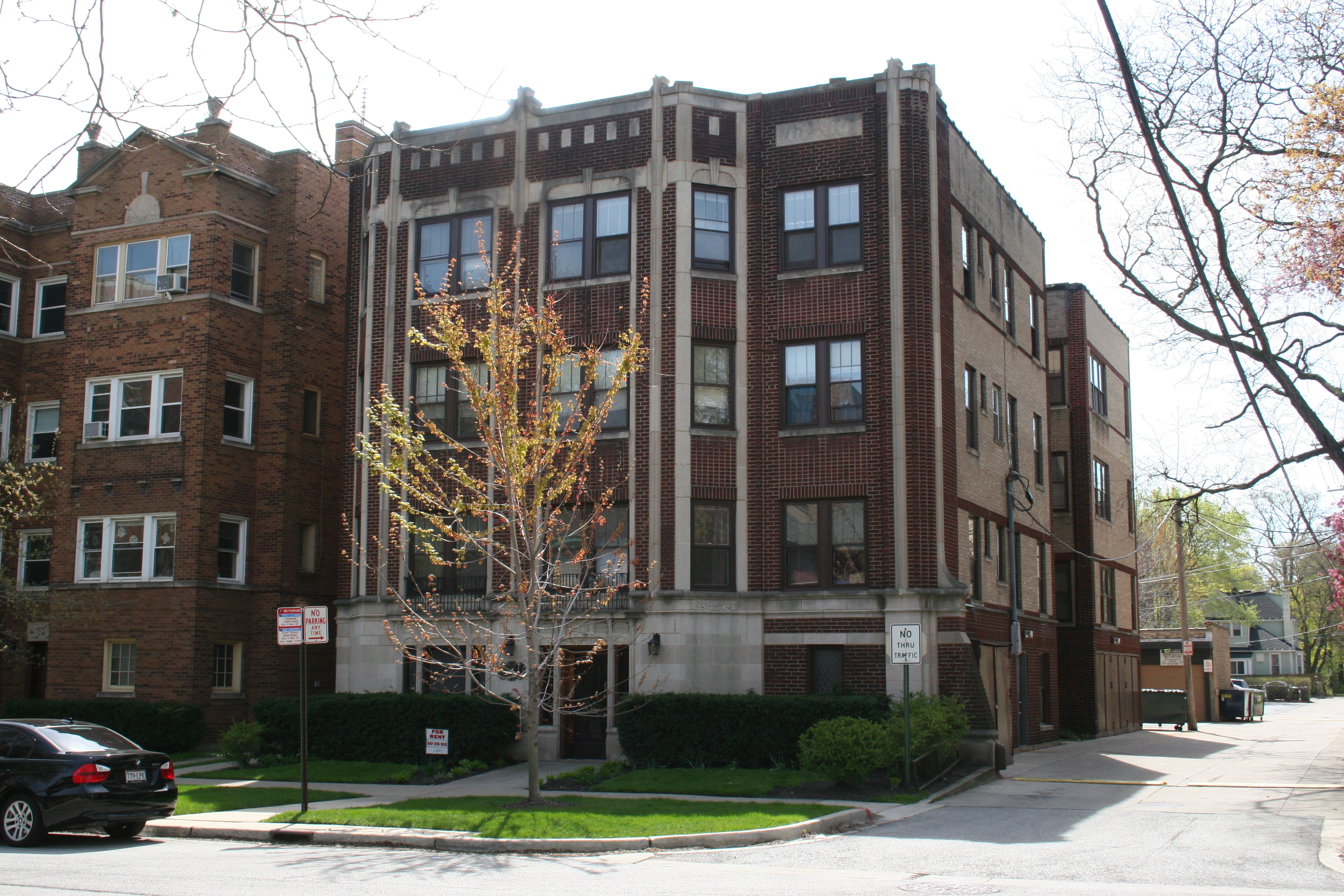
- Ridge Grove apartments in 2012

- Location within Chicago metropolitan area Location within Illinois Location within the United States
- Location: 1112 Grove St., Evanston, Illinois
- Coordinates: 42°02′43″N 87°41′16″W
- Area: 0.1 acres (0.040 ha)
- Built: 1928
- Architect: Edward M. Sieja
- MPS: Suburban Apartment Buildings in Evanston TR
- NRHP reference No.: 84001030
- Added to NRHP: March 15, 1984

Ridge Grove is a historic apartment building at 1112 Grove Street in Evanston, Illinois. The three-story brick building was built in 1928. Architect Edward M. Sieja designed the building, which incorporates geometric and Neoclassical elements. The building features a projecting section across most of its front facade, sidelights and a fan around the entrance, limestone trim, and piers at its corners. The lobby includes a mock fireplace to resemble the foyer of a house.

The building was added to the National Register of Historic Places on March 15, 1984.
