= Building at 548–606 Michigan Avenue =

- U.S. National Register of Historic Places
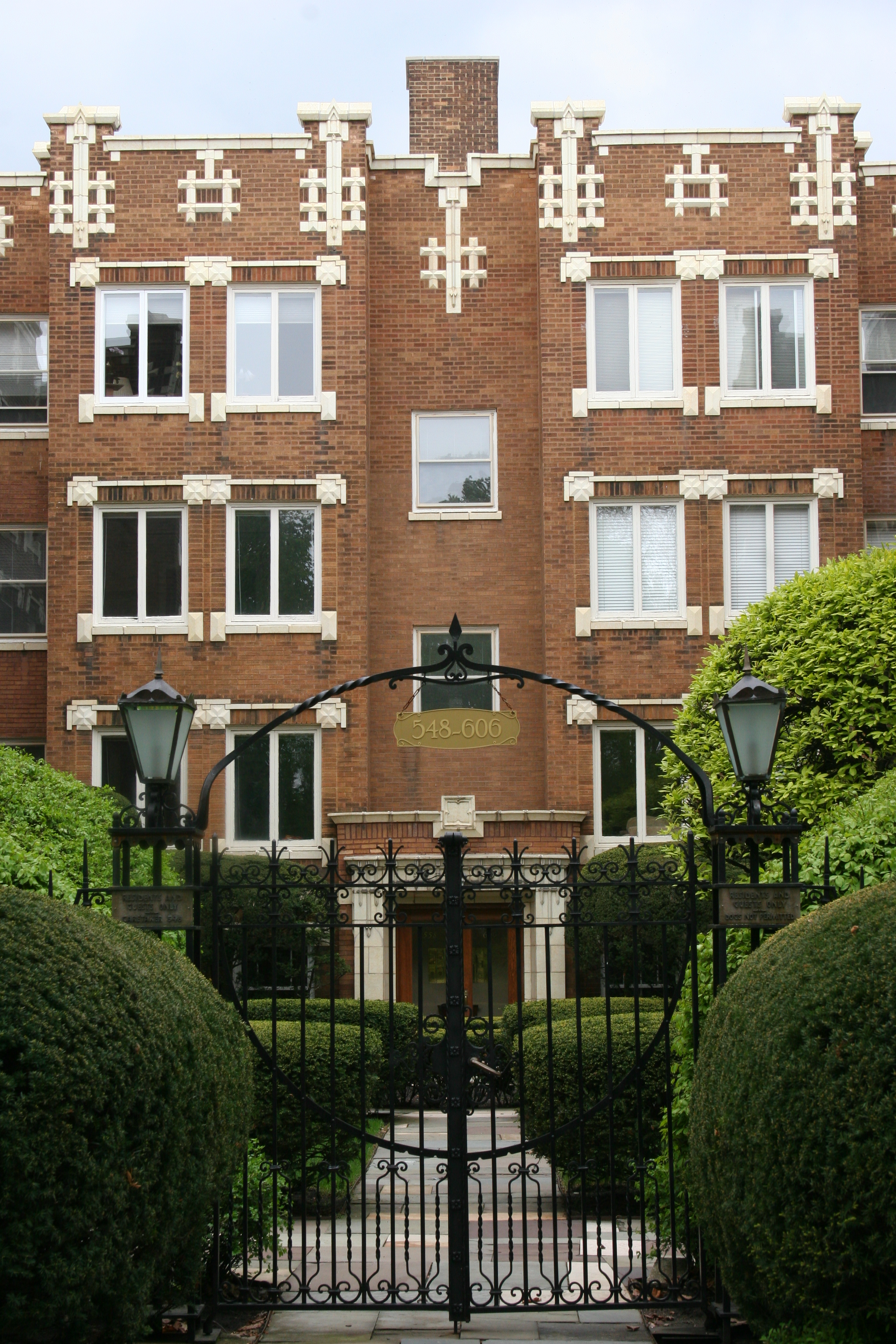
- Building at 548–606 Michigan Ave. in 2012

- Location within Chicago metropolitan area Location within Illinois Location within the United States
- Location: 548–606 Michigan Ave., Evanston, Illinois
- Coordinates: 42°01′43″N 87°40′21″W
- Area: 0.6 acres (0.24 ha)
- Built: 1924
- Architect: N. Hilton Smith
- MPS: Suburban Apartment Buildings in Evanston TR
- NRHP reference No.: 84000945
- Added to NRHP: March 15, 1984

The Building at 548–606 Michigan Avenue is a historic building in Evanston, Illinois. The three-story brown brick building was built in 1924. Architect N. Hilton Smith designed the building, which incorporates elements of Gothic and Prairie School architecture. The building's design features geometric themes, projecting bays, terra cotta detailing, and a brick parapet. The building encircles a recessed courtyard with a wrought iron gate and multicolored stone paths.

The building was added to the National Register of Historic Places on March 15, 1984.
