= Maple Court Apartments =

- U.S. National Register of Historic Places
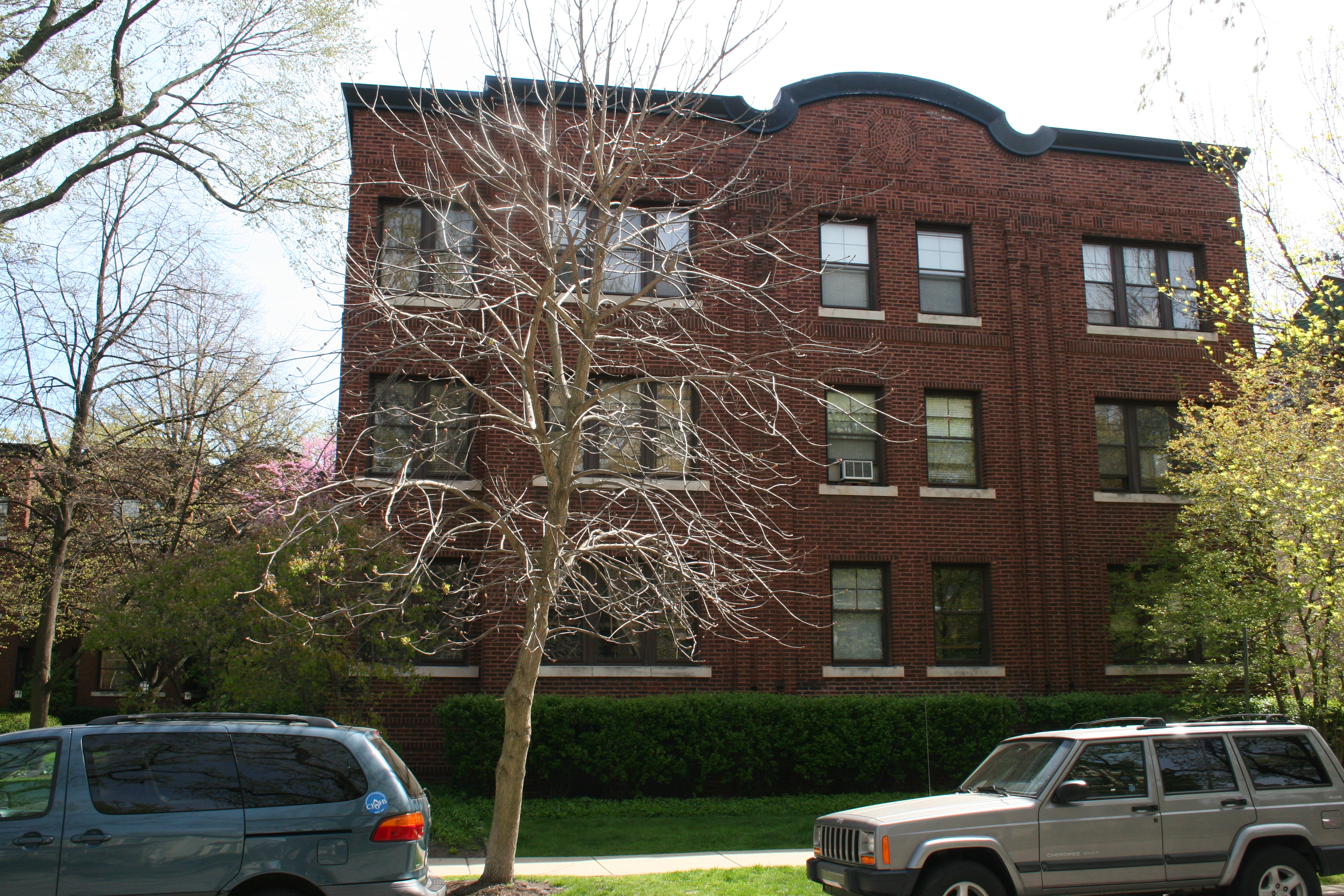
- Maple Court Apartments in 2012

- Location within Chicago metropolitan area Location within Illinois Location within the United States
- Location: 1115-1133 Maple Ave., Evanston, Illinois
- Coordinates: 42°02′20″N 87°41′06″W
- Area: 0.8 acres (0.32 ha)
- Built: 1915
- Architect: George S. Kingsley
- MPS: Suburban Apartment Buildings in Evanston TR
- NRHP reference No.: 84001013
- Added to NRHP: March 15, 1984

Maple Court Apartments is a historic apartment building at 1115-1133 Maple Avenue in Evanston, Illinois. The three-story brick building was built in 1915. Architect George S. Kingsley gave the building a geometrical design similar to those used in Prairie School buildings, though the building is not itself Prairie School. The building's design includes patterned brickwork, limestone arches and windowsills, and parapets with decorative sunbursts. The U-shaped building surrounds an open courtyard, a common feature of Evanston's apartment buildings.

The building was added to the National Register of Historic Places on March 15, 1984.
