= Tudor Manor =

- U.S. National Register of Historic Places
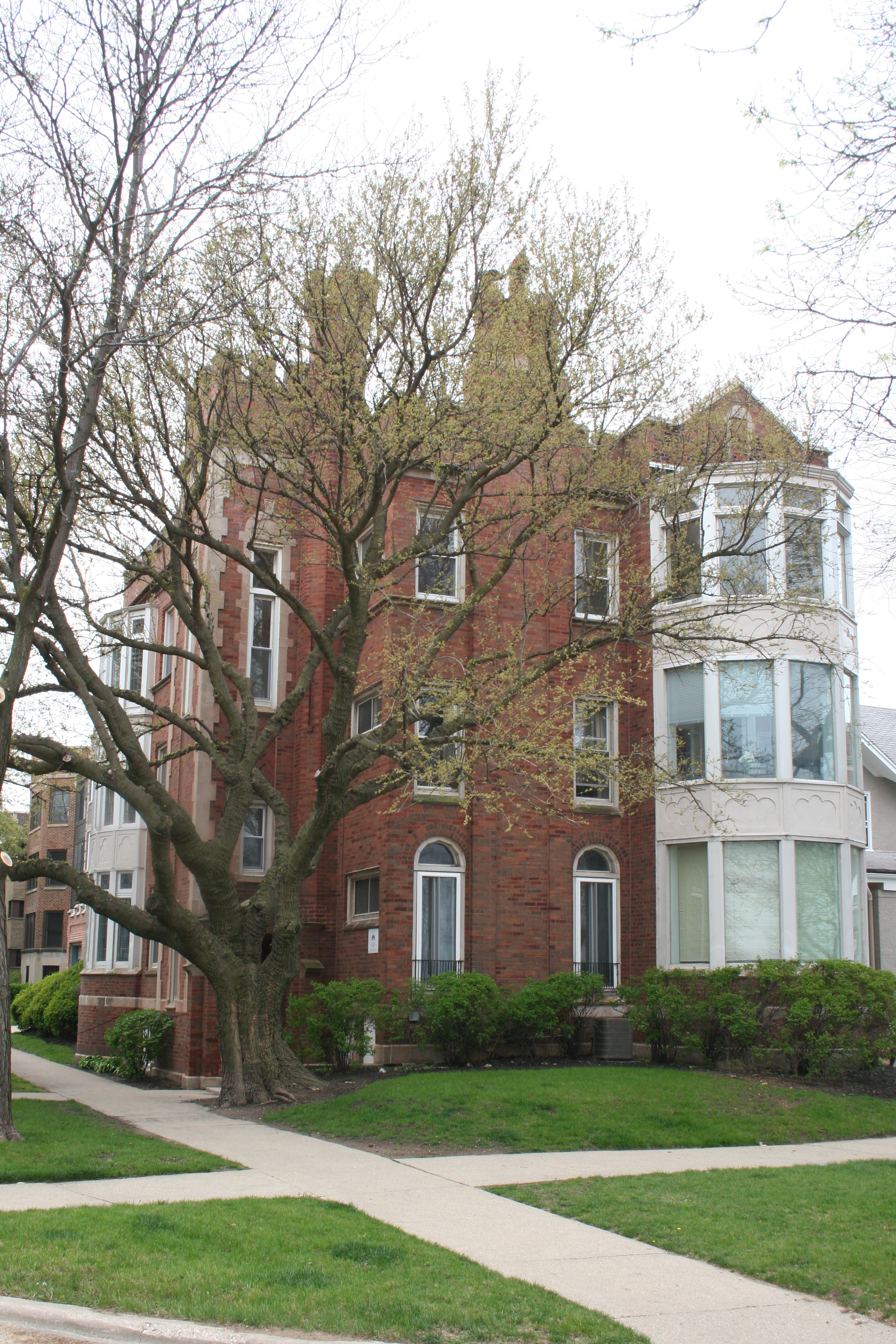
- Tudor Manor in 2012

- Location within Chicago metropolitan area Location within Illinois Location within the United States
- Location: 524 Sheridan Sq., Evanston, Illinois
- Coordinates: 42°01′39″N 87°40′09″W
- Area: 0.1 acres (0.040 ha)
- Built: 1916
- Architect: Louis C. Bouchard
- Architectural style: Tudor Revival
- MPS: Suburban Apartment Buildings in Evanston TR
- NRHP reference No.: 84001058
- Added to NRHP: March 15, 1984

Tudor Manor is a historic apartment building at 524 Sheridan Square in Evanston, Illinois. The brick three-flat was built in 1916. Architect Louis C. Bouchard designed the building in the Tudor Revival style. The building's design includes multiple large bay windows, an arched entrance, a crenellated roofline, and multiple ornate chimneys. Each apartment originally included amenities such as a sunroom, a library, a maid's room, a fireplace, mahogany detailing, and a vacuum cleaning system.

The building was added to the National Register of Historic Places on March 15, 1984.
