= Buildings at 815–817 Brummel and 819–821 Brummel =

- U.S. National Register of Historic Places
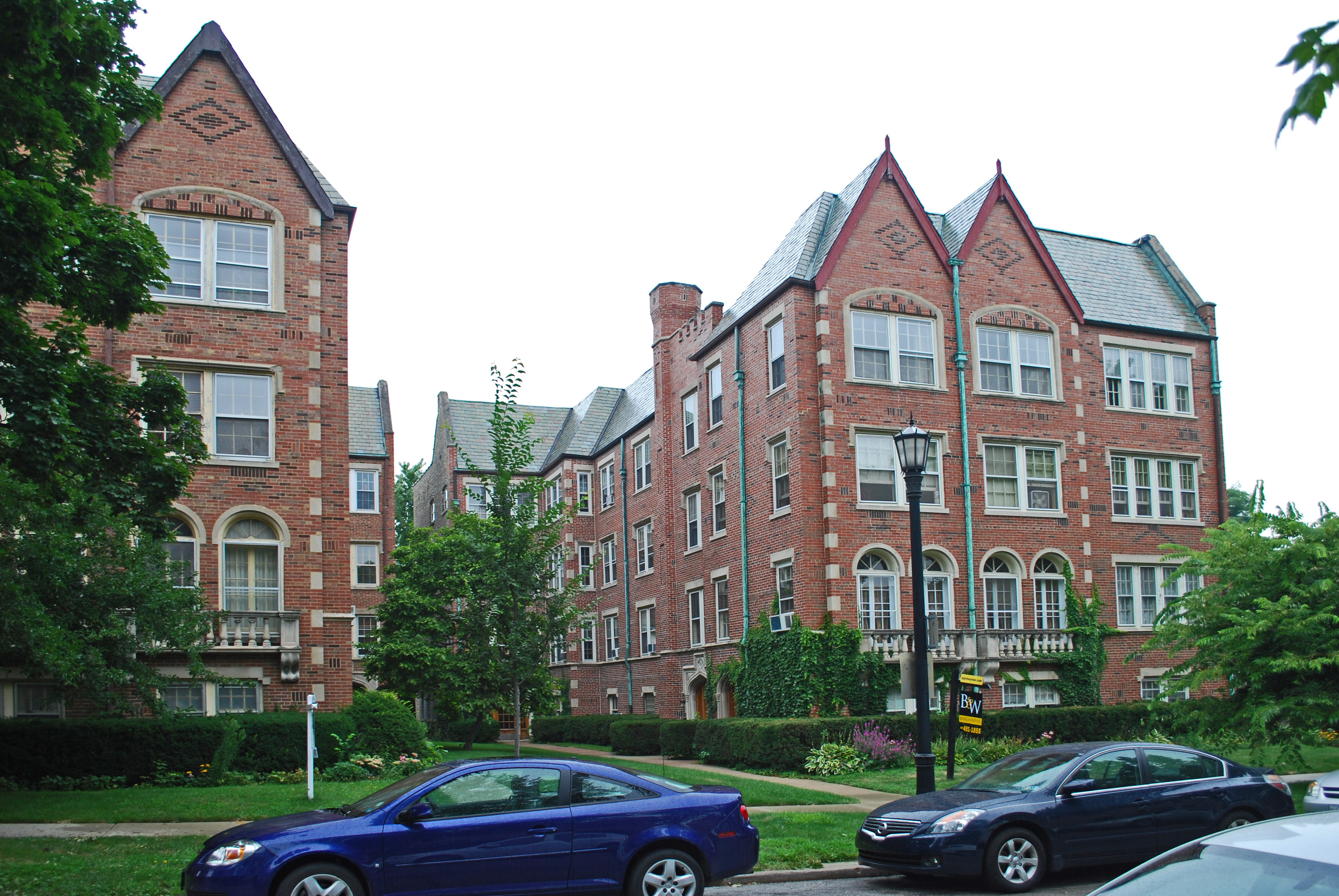
- Buildings in 2010

- Location within Chicago metropolitan area Location within Illinois Location within the United States
- Location: 815–821 Brummel, Evanston, Illinois
- Coordinates: 42°01′17″N 87°41′04″W
- Area: 0.4 acres (0.16 ha)
- Built: 1927, 1928
- Architect: E.L. Kline; Kocher & Larson
- Architectural style: Tudor Revival
- MPS: Suburban Apartment Buildings in Evanston TR
- NRHP reference No.: 84000952
- Added to NRHP: March 15, 1984

The Buildings at 815–817 Brummel and 819–821 Brummel are two historic apartment buildings in Evanston, Illinois. Built in 1928 and 1927 respectively, the two three-story buildings have identical, mirrored Tudor Revival designs. Despite being identical, the buildings were designed by two different architects; 815–817 was designed by E.L. Kline, while 819–821 was designed by Kocher & Larson. Each building features a brick exterior with limestone detailing, Tudor arched entrances, double gables with a diamond pattern facing the street, and crenellation and a small tower on the courtyard-facing side. The two buildings encircle a shared open courtyard, causing them to resemble a single U-shaped courtyard apartment building; while such courtyard apartments are common in Evanston, the buildings are the only multi-building example of the design.

The buildings were added to the National Register of Historic Places on March 15, 1984.
