= Ridge Manor (Evanston, Illinois) =

- U.S. National Register of Historic Places
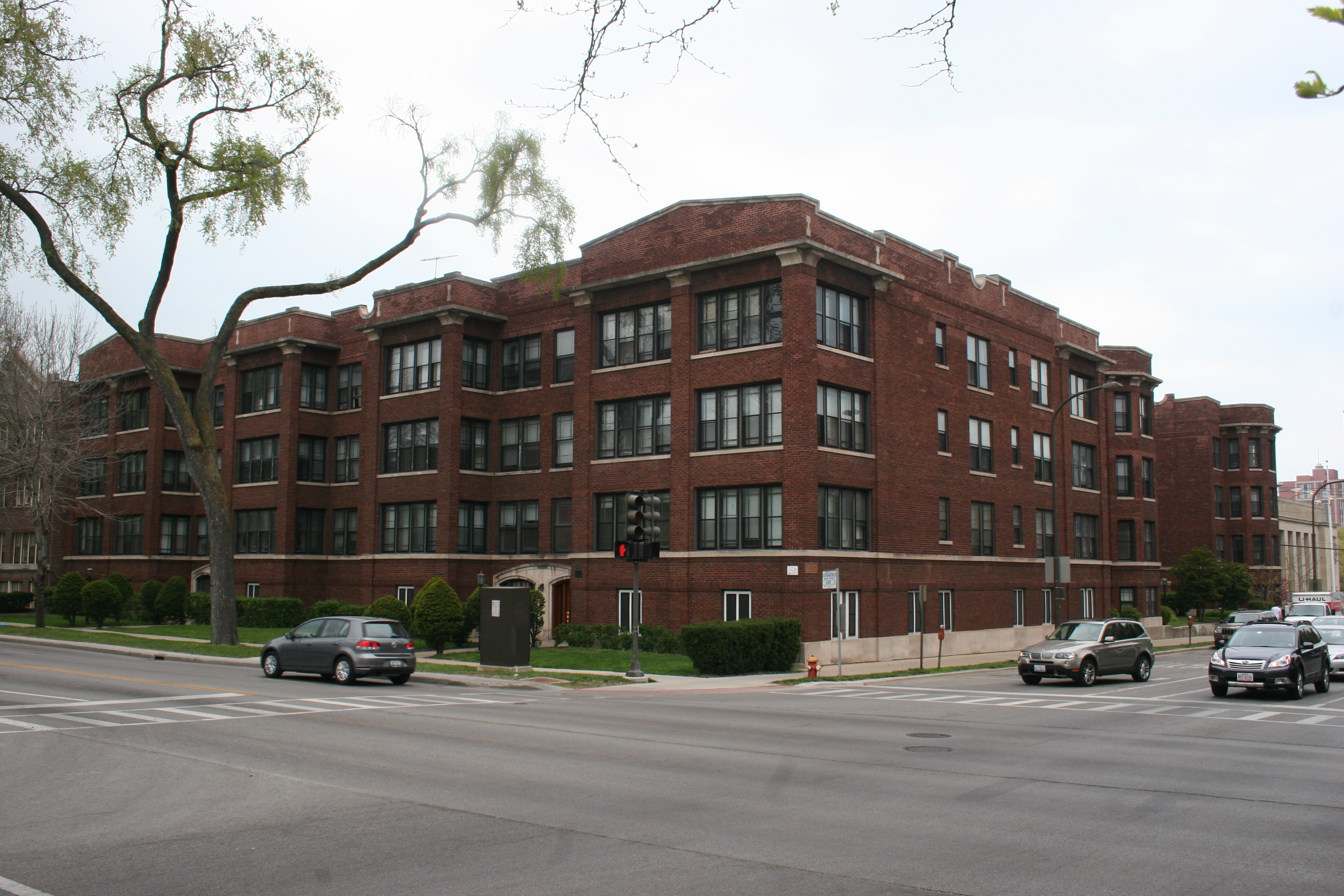
- Ridge Manor in 2012

- Location within Chicago metropolitan area Location within Illinois Location within the United States
- Location: 1603-1611 Ridge Ave. and 1125 Davis St., Evanston, Illinois
- Coordinates: 42°02′51″N 87°41′19″W
- Area: 0.7 acres (0.28 ha)
- Built: 1916
- Architect: William H. Pruyn, Jr.
- MPS: Suburban Apartment Buildings in Evanston TR
- NRHP reference No.: 84001034
- Added to NRHP: March 15, 1984

Ridge Manor is a historic apartment building at the northeast corner of Ridge Avenue and Davis Street in Evanston, Illinois. The three-story brick building was built in 1916. The building consists of two sections: the section facing Ridge Avenue contains the building's larger apartments, while the U-shaped section facing Davis Street contains smaller apartments and includes an open courtyard. Architect William H. Pruyn, Jr., designed the building. The building's design features limestone detailing, protruding bays, and a cornice and parapet at the roof line.

The building was added to the National Register of Historic Places on March 15, 1984.
