= Evanston Towers =

- U.S. National Register of Historic Places
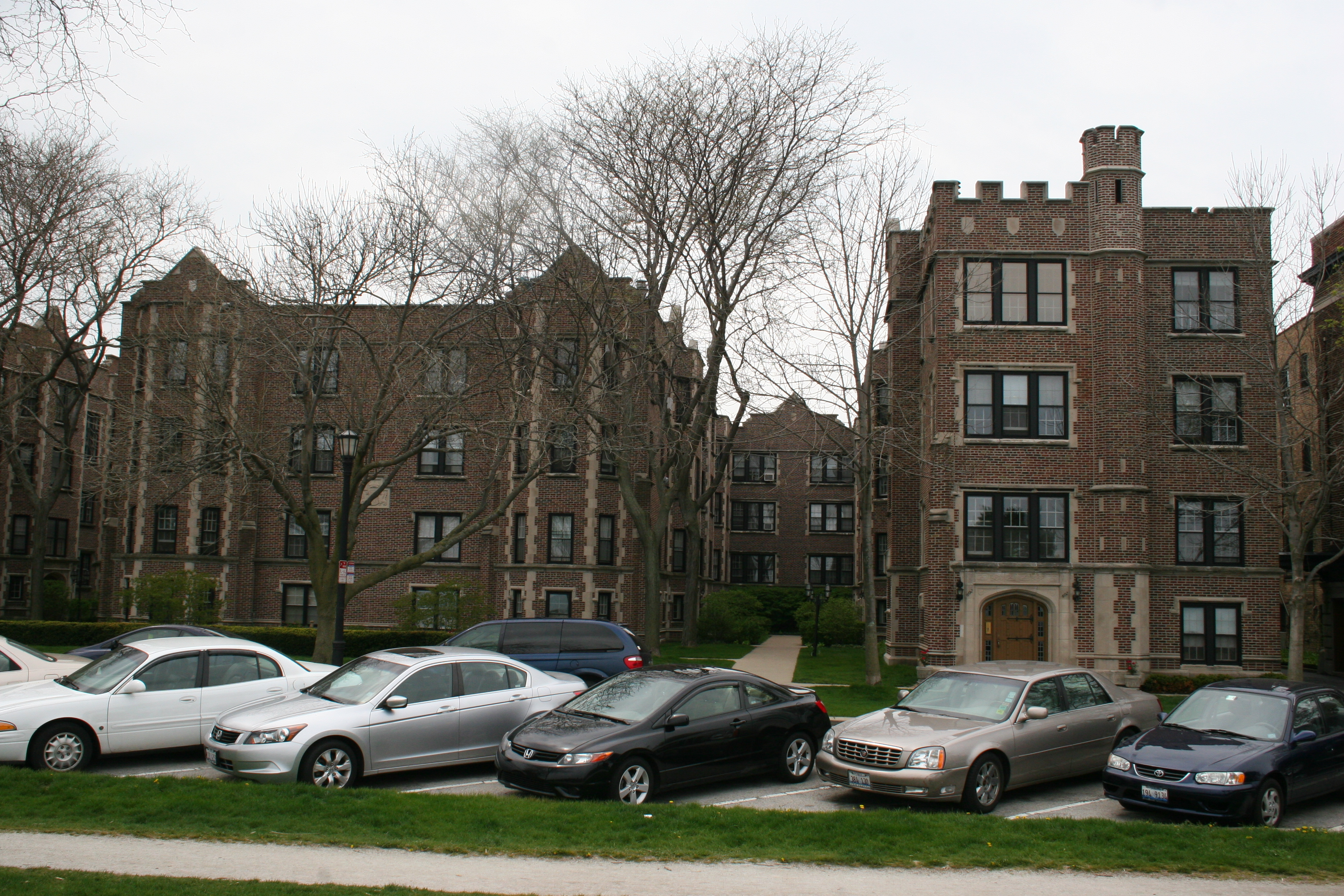

- Location within Illinois Location within the United States
- Location: 554-602 Sheridan Sq., Evanston, Illinois
- Coordinates: 42°1′43″N 87°40′10″W
- Area: 0.8 acres (0.32 ha)
- Built: 1924
- Architect: Quitsow, Anthony
- Architectural style: Tudor Revival
- MPS: Suburban Apartment Buildings in Evanston TR
- NRHP reference No.: 84000990
- Added to NRHP: March 15, 1984

The Evanston Towers are a historic apartment building located at 554–602 Sheridan Square in Evanston, Illinois. It was built in 1924 and designed by Anthony H. Quitsow. The E-shaped building was designed in the Tudor Revival style and has two courtyards, a crenelated tower on the north side, entrances with Tudor arches, and limestone decorations. Early advertising for the apartments billed them as "among the finest in Evanston" due to the building's design, amenities, and views of Lake Michigan.

The building was added to the National Register of Historic Places on March 15, 1984.
