= Melwood Apartments =

- U.S. National Register of Historic Places
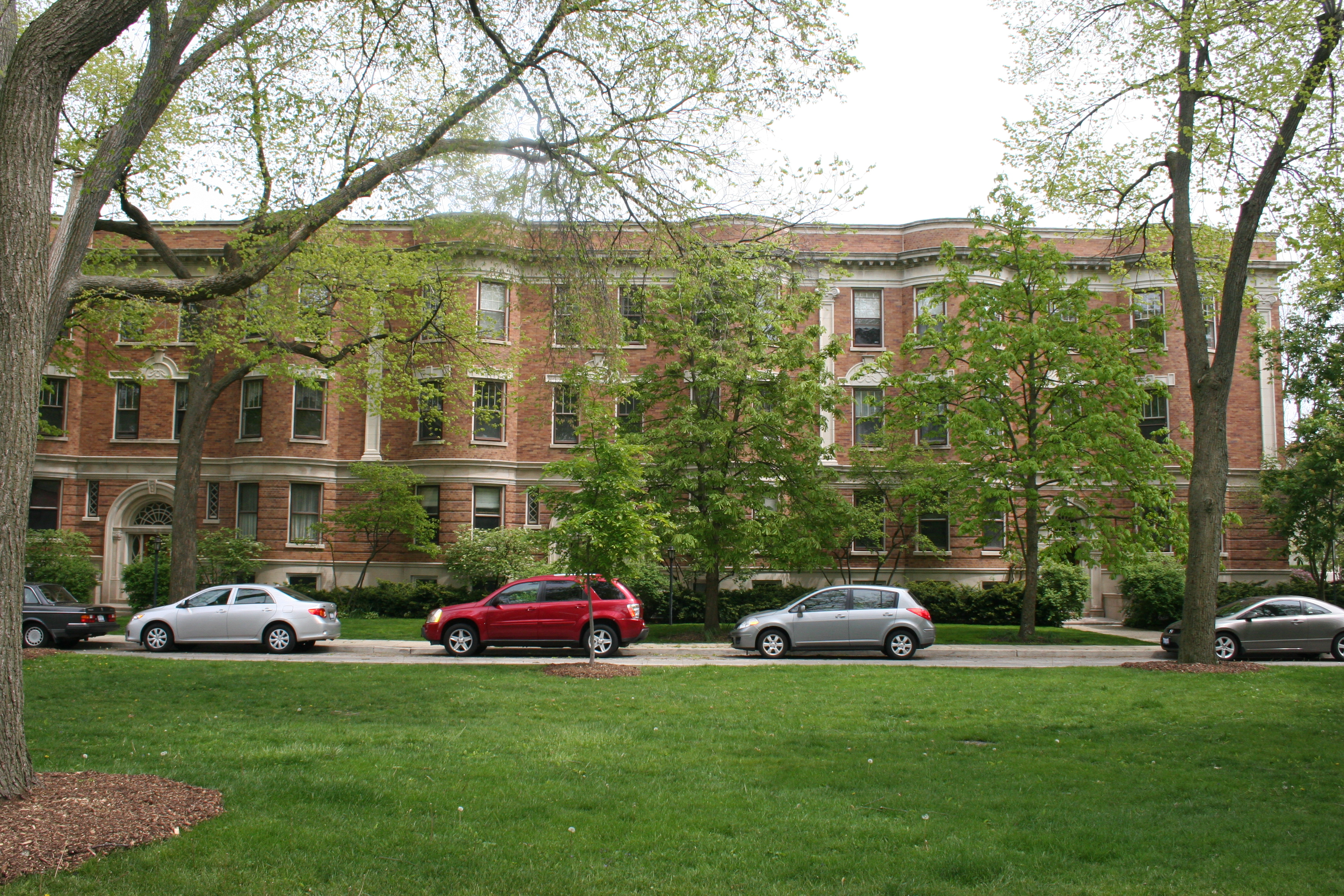
- Melwood Apartments in 2012

- Location within Chicago metropolitan area Location within Illinois Location within the United States
- Location: 1201-1213 Michigan Ave. and 205-207 Hamilton St., Evanston, Illinois
- Coordinates: 42°02′22″N 87°40′24″W
- Area: 0.4 acres (0.16 ha)
- Built: 1901
- Architect: Wilmore Alloway
- MPS: Suburban Apartment Buildings in Evanston TR
- NRHP reference No.: 84001016
- Added to NRHP: March 15, 1984

Melwood Apartments is a historic apartment building at the northeast corner of Michigan Avenue and Hamilton Street in Evanston, Illinois. Built in 1901, the three-story building was one of the first apartment buildings in Evanston. Its construction sparked an outcry in the surrounding neighborhood, which had consisted entirely of single-family houses; the controversy was a precursor to further fights over zoning in Evanston, which ultimately led to the city passing the state's first zoning law in 1921. Architect Wilmore Alloway designed the building with elements of various popular architectural styles of the period. The building features Colonial Revival entrances, Richardsonian Romanesque columns, and Neoclassical ornamentation.

The building was added to the National Register of Historic Places on March 15, 1984.
