= Colonnade Court =

- U.S. National Register of Historic Places
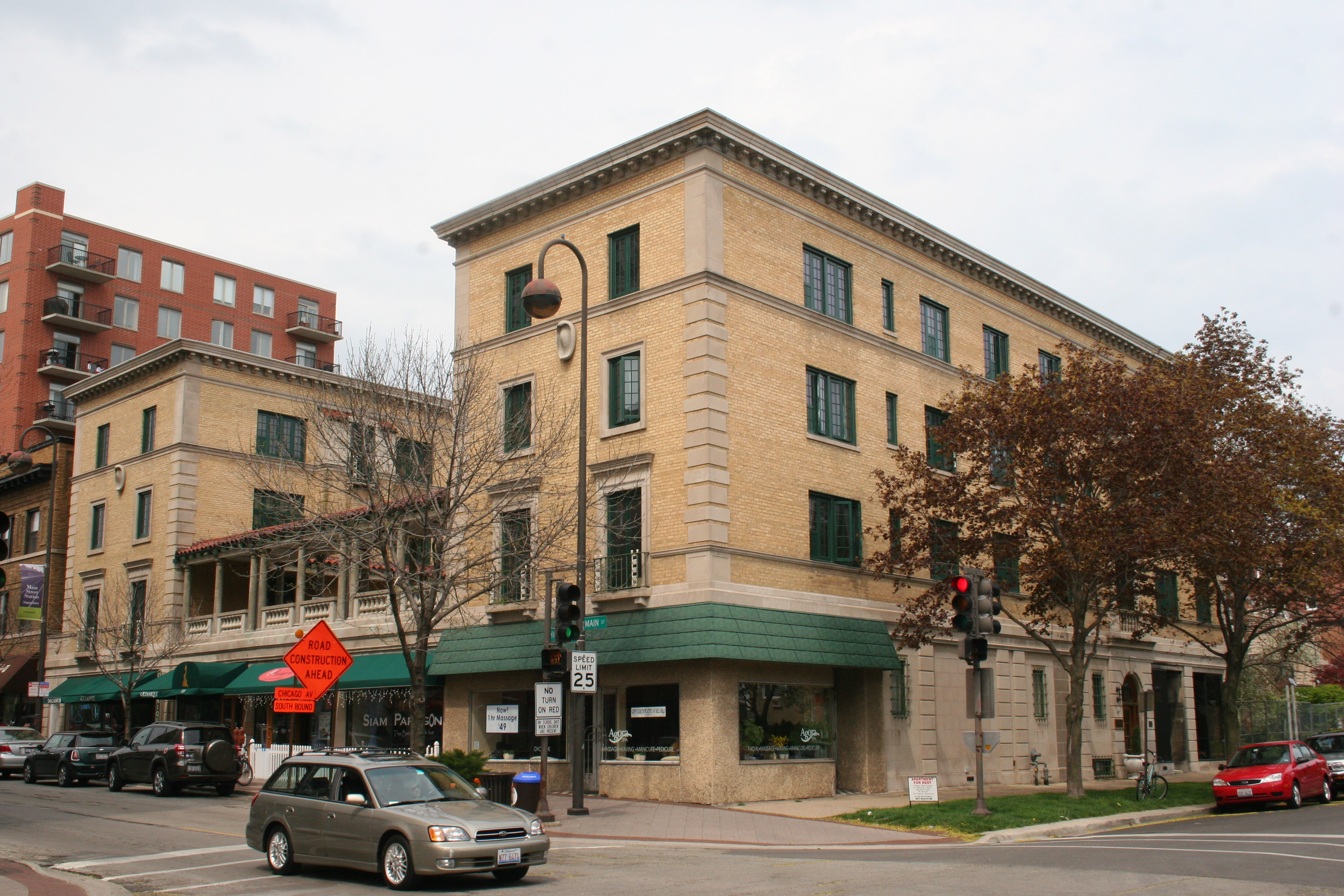
- Colonnade Court in 2012

- Location within Chicago metropolitan area Location within Illinois Location within the United States
- Location: 501-507 Main St., 904-908 Hinman Ave., Evanston, Illinois
- Coordinates: 42°02′06″N 87°40′43″W
- Area: 0.3 acres (0.12 ha)
- Built: 1928-29
- Architect: Thielbar & Fugard
- Architectural style: Italian Renaissance
- MPS: Suburban Apartment Buildings in Evanston TR
- NRHP reference No.: 84000987
- Added to NRHP: March 15, 1984

Colonnade Court is a historic apartment building at the northwest corner of Main Street and Hinman Avenue in Evanston, Illinois. The four-story building was built in 1928–29. The building's first floor is used as commercial space, while the other three floors house apartments. Like many of Evanston's apartment buildings, the building has a "U" shape with a central courtyard; however, the courtyard is on the second floor to separate it from the commercial space. Architects Thielbar & Fugard designed the building to imitate an Italian Renaissance villa. The building's design includes a colonnade concealing its courtyard from the street, arched entrances, and a bracketed cornice.

The building was added to the National Register of Historic Places on March 15, 1984.
