= Andridge Apartments =

- U.S. National Register of Historic Places
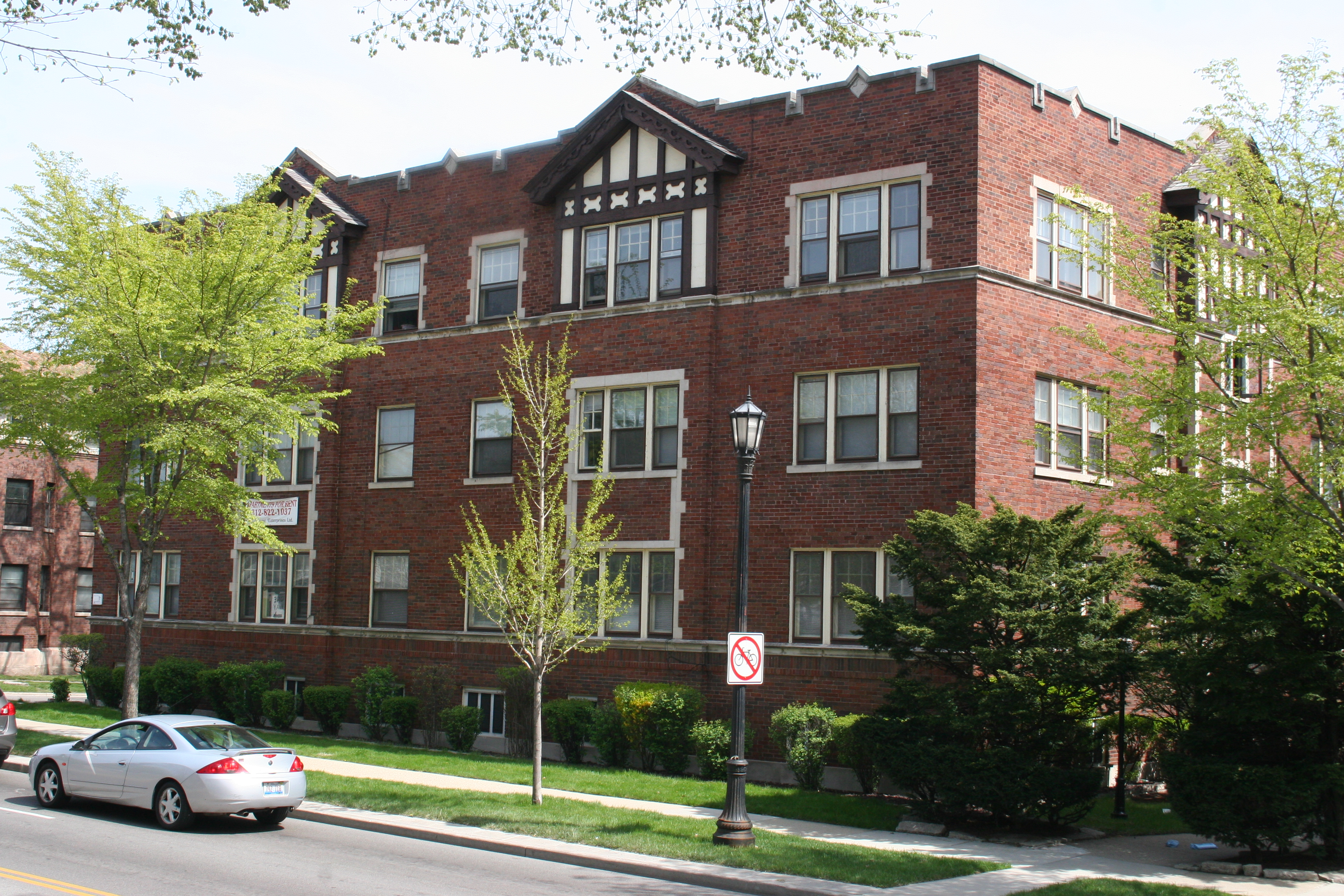

- Location within Illinois Location within the United States
- Location: 1627-1645 Ridge Ave., 1124-1136 Church St., Evanston, Illinois
- Coordinates: 42°2′54″N 87°41′19″W
- Area: 0.7 acres (0.28 ha)
- Built: 1923
- Architect: Ostergren, Robert C.
- Architectural style: Tudor Revival
- MPS: Suburban Apartment Buildings in Evanston TR
- NRHP reference No.: 84000927
- Added to NRHP: March 15, 1984

The Andridge Apartments is a historic apartment building located at the intersection of Ridge Avenue and Church Street in Evanston, Illinois. The building was built in 1923 and designed by Robert C. Ostergren. The S-shaped building has two courtyards, a front courtyard facing Ridge Avenue and a rear courtyard for units on Church Street. The building was designed in the Tudor Revival style and features regularly spaced bays with gables, limestone trim, and Tudor arches around its entrances. On March 15, 1984, the building was added to the National Register of Historic Places.
