= Building at 1505–1509 Oak Avenue =

- U.S. National Register of Historic Places
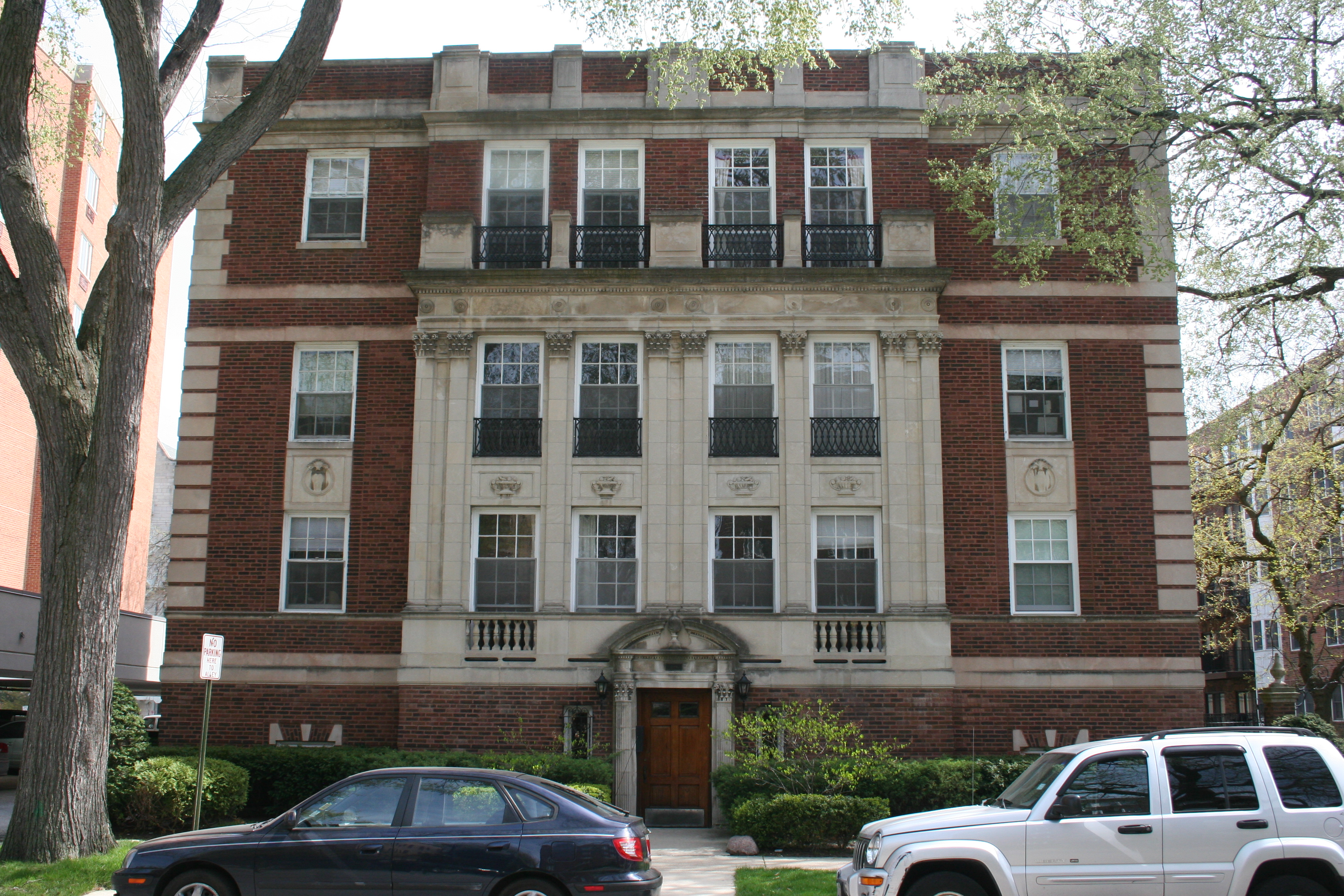
- Building at 1505-1509 Oak in 2012

- Location within Chicago metropolitan area Location within Illinois Location within the United States
- Location: 1505–1509 Oak Ave., Evanston, Illinois
- Coordinates: 42°02′43″N 87°41′12″W
- Area: 0.3 acres (0.12 ha)
- Built: 1925
- Architect: Samuel N. Crowen
- MPS: Suburban Apartment Buildings in Evanston TR
- NRHP reference No.: 84000976
- Added to NRHP: March 15, 1984

The Building at 1505–1509 Oak Avenue is a historic apartment building in Evanston, Illinois. The three-story brick building was built in 1925. The building is L-shaped with a half courtyard, a relatively common apartment layout in Evanston. Samuel N. Crowen, who also designed 1450-56 Oak Avenue and the Abbey Garth Building at 400 Lee Street, was the architect of the building. The building's design features limestone pilasters separating its windows, limestone quoins, pilasters and a pediment around the entrance, and a brick parapet.

The building was added to the National Register of Historic Places on March 15, 1984.
