= Rookwood Apartments =

- U.S. National Register of Historic Places
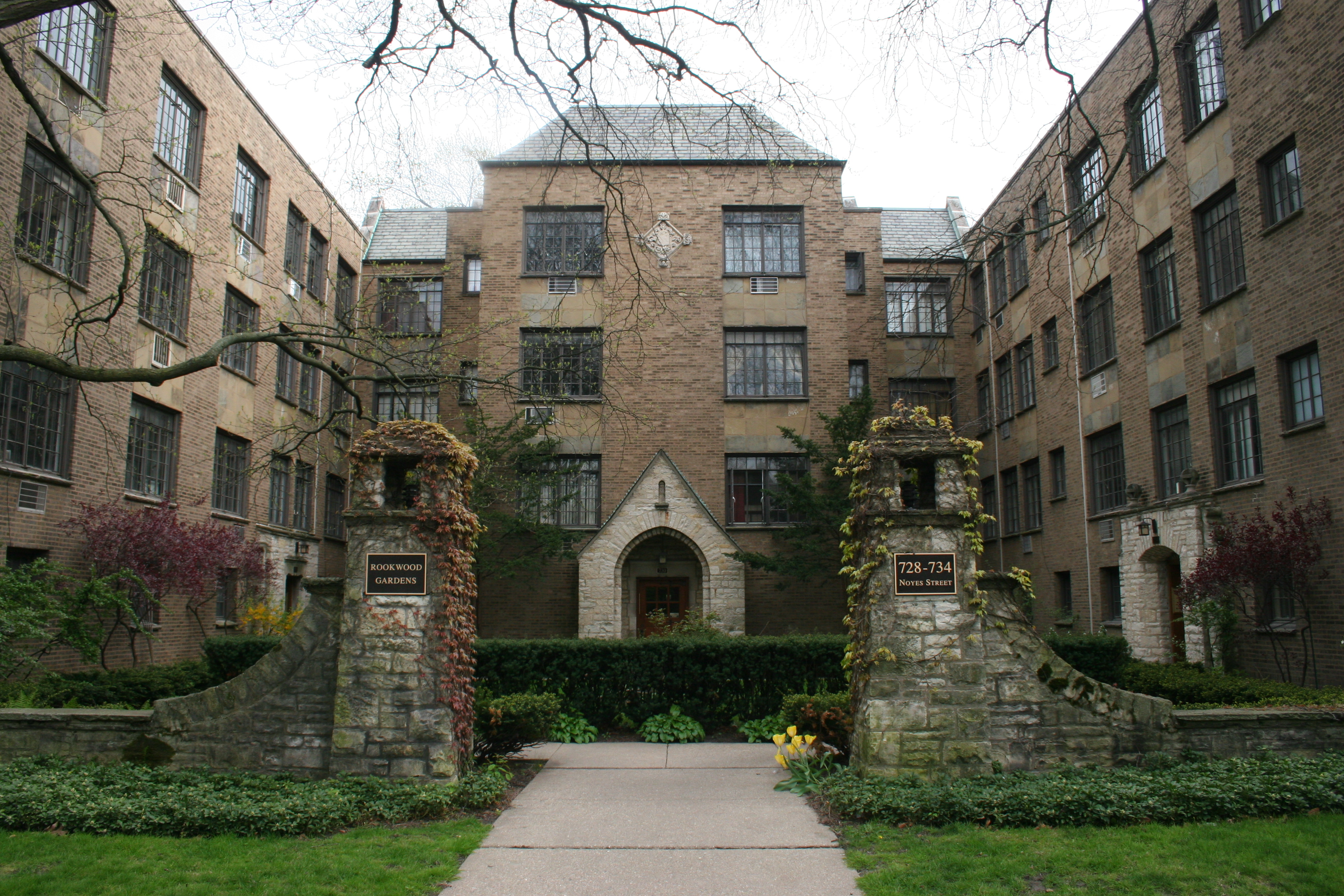
- Rookwood Apartments in 2012

- Location within Chicago metropolitan area Location within Illinois Location within the United States
- Location: 718–734 Noyes St., Evanston, Illinois
- Coordinates: 42°03′30″N 87°40′53″W
- Area: 0.7 acres (0.28 ha)
- Built: 1927
- Architect: Conner & O'Connor
- Architectural style: Tudor Revival
- MPS: Suburban Apartment Buildings in Evanston TR
- NRHP reference No.: 84001043
- Added to NRHP: March 15, 1984

Rookwood Apartments is a historic apartment building at 718–734 Noyes Street in Evanston, Illinois. The three-story brick building was built in 1927. Architects Conner & O'Connor designed the building in the Tudor Revival style. The building's design includes limestone trim, large square blocks of stone separating the casement windows, and ashlar stone entrances and courtyard walls. The building is noteworthy among Evanston's apartments for its two courtyards; one is open and faces the street, while the second is more private and to the side of the building.

The building was added to the National Register of Historic Places on March 15, 1984.
