= Buildings at 1301–1303 and 1305–1307 Judson Avenue =

- U.S. National Register of Historic Places
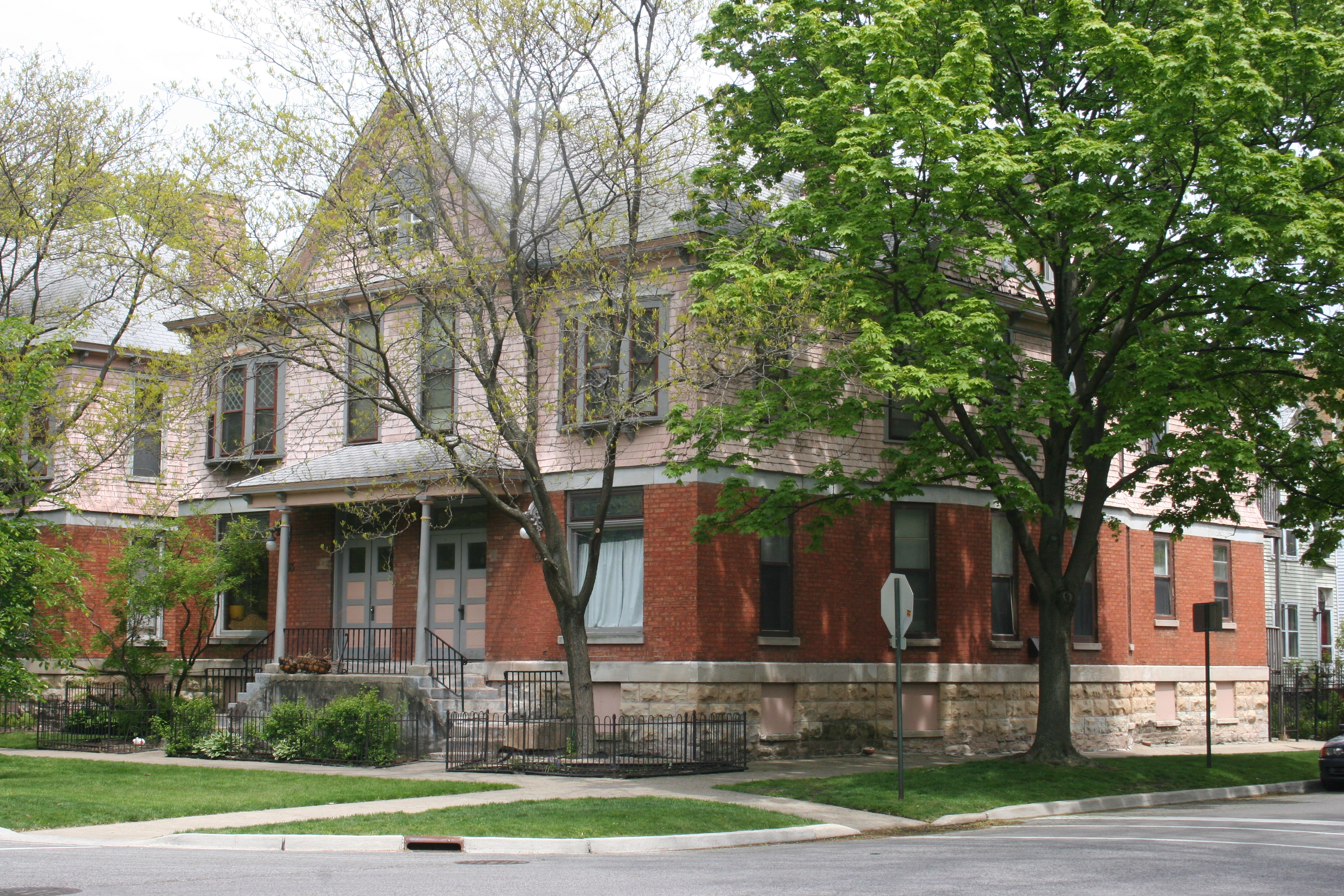
- 1301–1303 Judson Avenue

- Location within Chicago metropolitan area Location within Illinois Location within the United States
- Location: 1301–1307 Judson Ave., Evanston, Illinois
- Coordinates: 42°02′29″N 87°40′36″W
- Built: 1894
- Architect: Sidney Smith
- Architectural style: Queen Anne
- MPS: Suburban Apartment Buildings in Evanston TR
- NRHP reference No.: 84000966, 84000968
- Added to NRHP: April 27, 1984

The Buildings at 1301–03 and 1305–07 Judson Avenue are two identical apartment buildings in Evanston, Illinois. Built in 1894, the buildings were among Evanston's first multi-unit apartments. Each building has four units which form a "U" shape. Architect Sidney Smith designed the buildings in the Queen Anne style, which was popular in the late nineteenth century and used in many houses in the vicinity of the apartments. The buildings each feature a brick first floor and shingled second floor, a single porch with two entrances, bay windows, and a bracketed cornice.

The buildings were added to the National Register of Historic Places on April 27, 1984. Despite being identical, the buildings are listed separately.

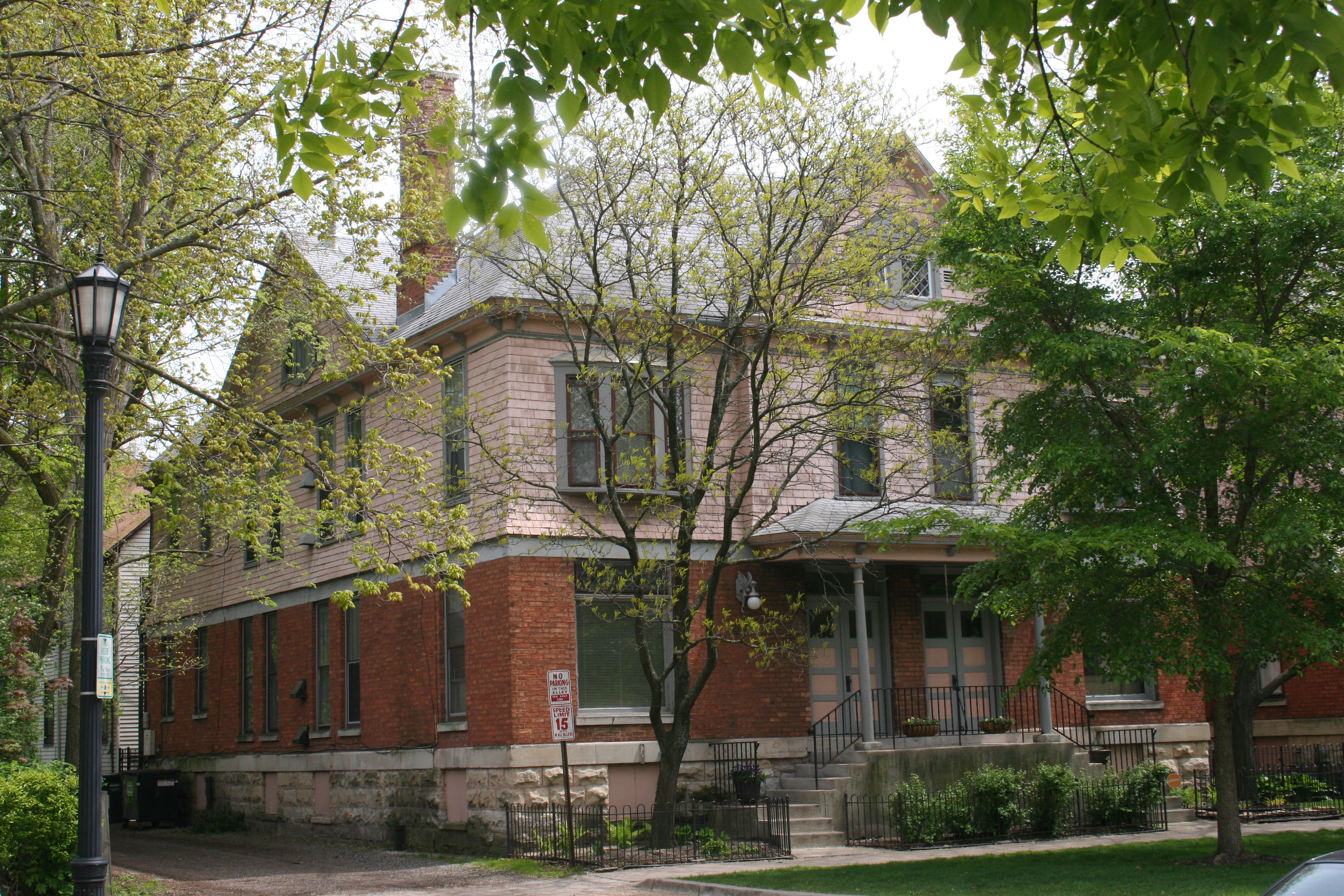
1305–1307 Judson Avenue
