= Buildings at 2517, 2519, and 2523 Central Street =

- Building at 2517 Central Street
- U.S. National Register of Historic Places
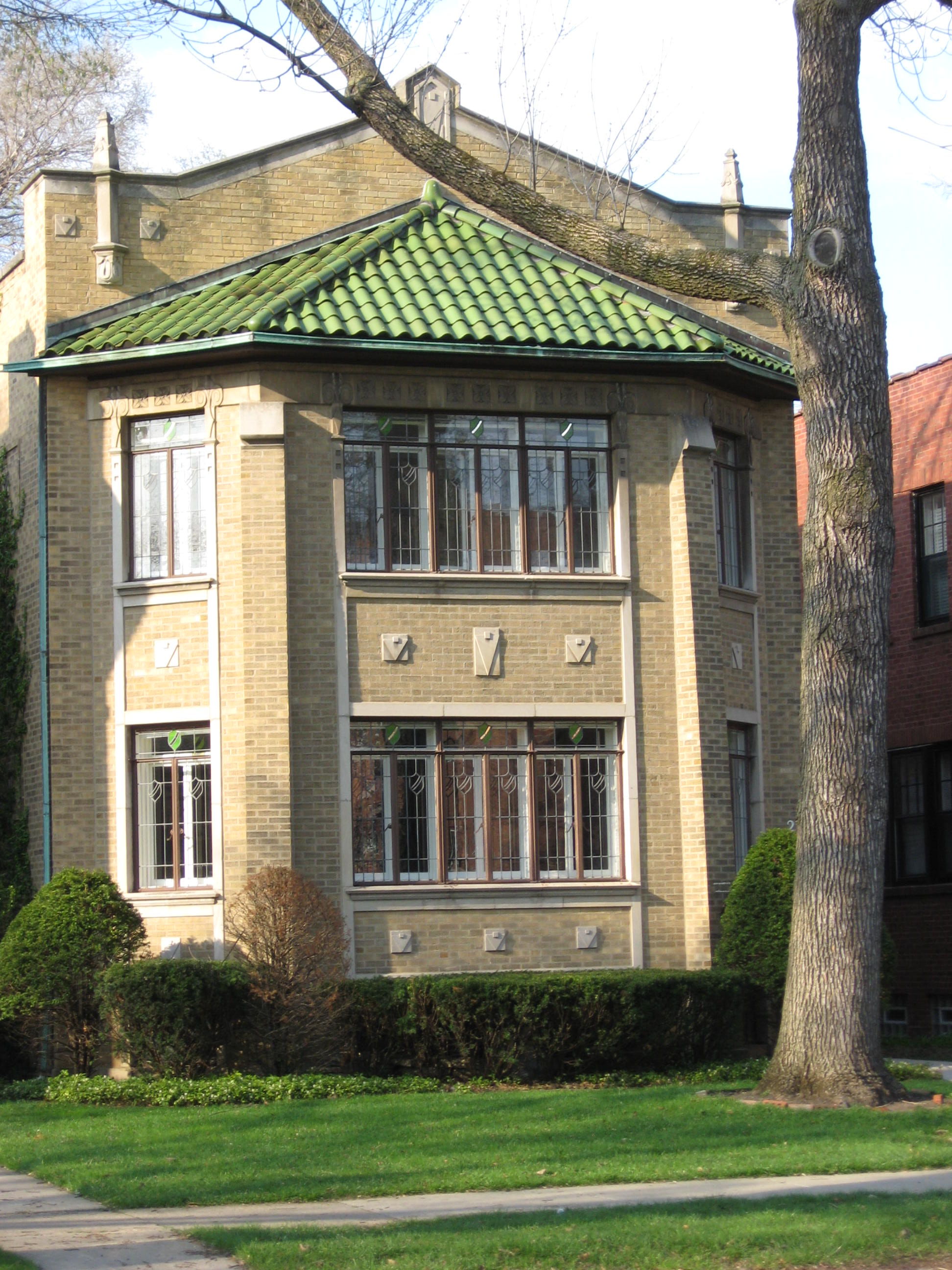
- 2517 Central Street

- Location within Chicago metropolitan area Location within Illinois Location within the United States
- Location: 2517, 2519, and 2523 Central St., Evanston, Illinois
- Coordinates: 42°03′53″N 87°42′31″W
- Built: 1927
- Architect: Arthur Jacobs
- MPS: Suburban Apartment Buildings in Evanston TR
- NRHP reference No.: 84000980, 84000982, 84000983
- Added to NRHP: March 15, 1984

The Buildings at 2517, 2519, and 2523 Central Street are three related apartment buildings at 2517, 2519, and 2523 Central Street in Evanston, Illinois. The three two-flats were built as part of one development project in 1927. Architect Arthur Jacobs designed all three buildings using a consistent theme, so that the three buildings would have different designs but appear as parts of a complex. Common features of each building include a light-colored brick exterior, a projecting front facade, stone trim, and green tile roofs. All three buildings have a vertical emphasis, which is created by either buttresses or piers. Each building has an ornate roof line; 2517 has a parapet crested by pinnacles, 2519 has brick piers capped by urns which extend above the roof, and 2523 has a parapet with limestone coping and pinnacles.

The buildings were added individually to the National Register of Historic Places on March 15, 1984.

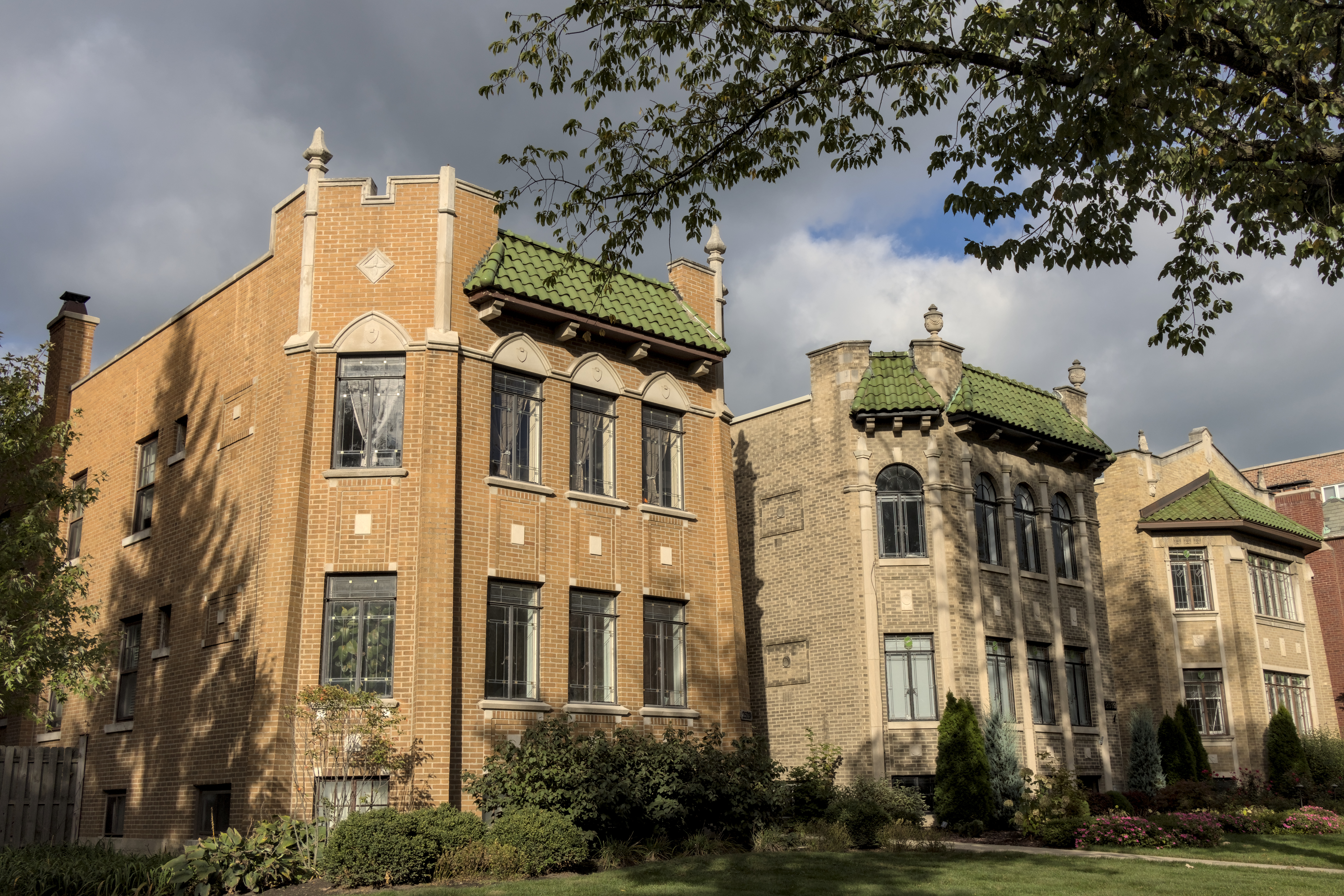
All three buildings with 2523 on the left.

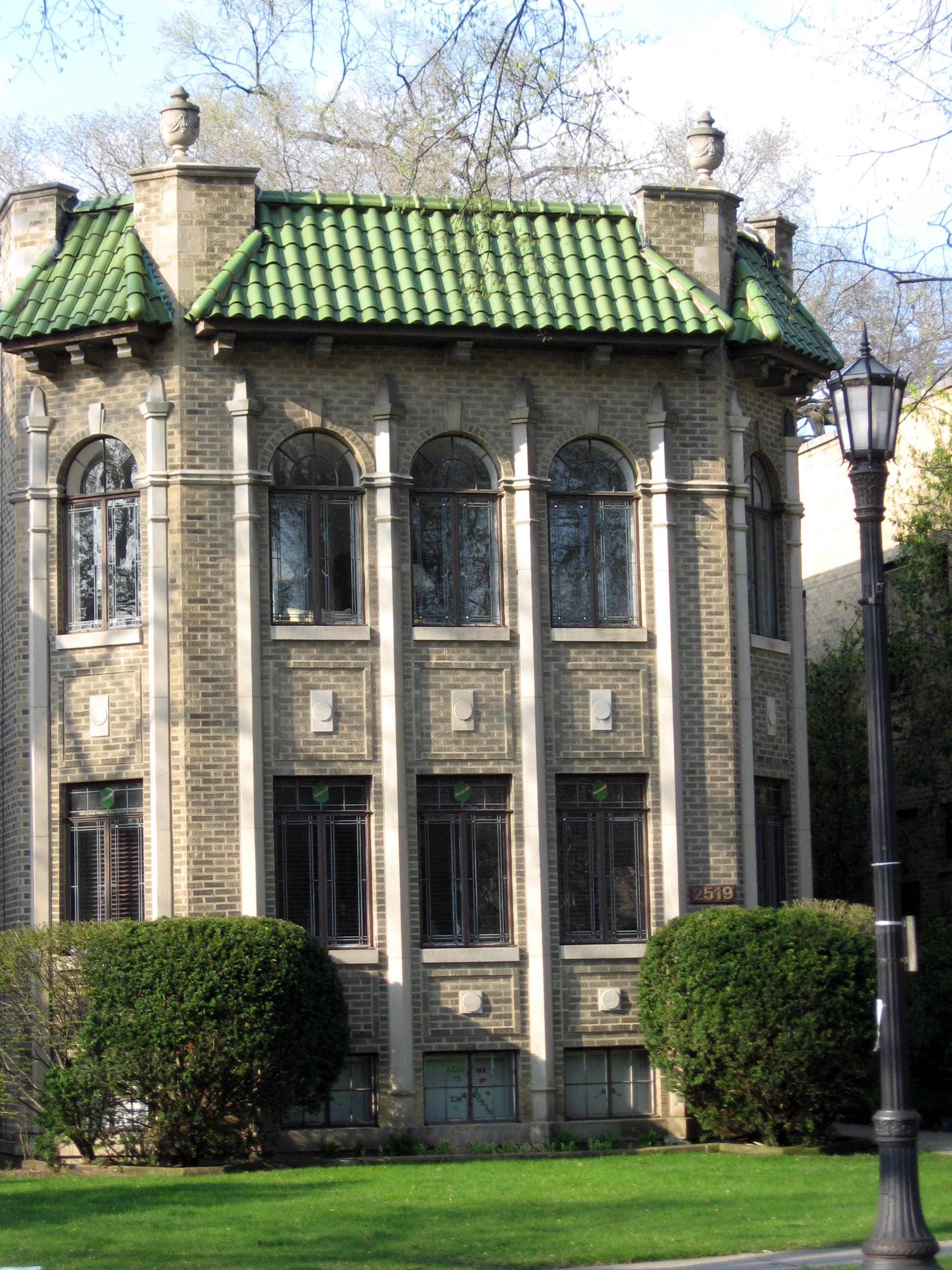
2519 Central Street

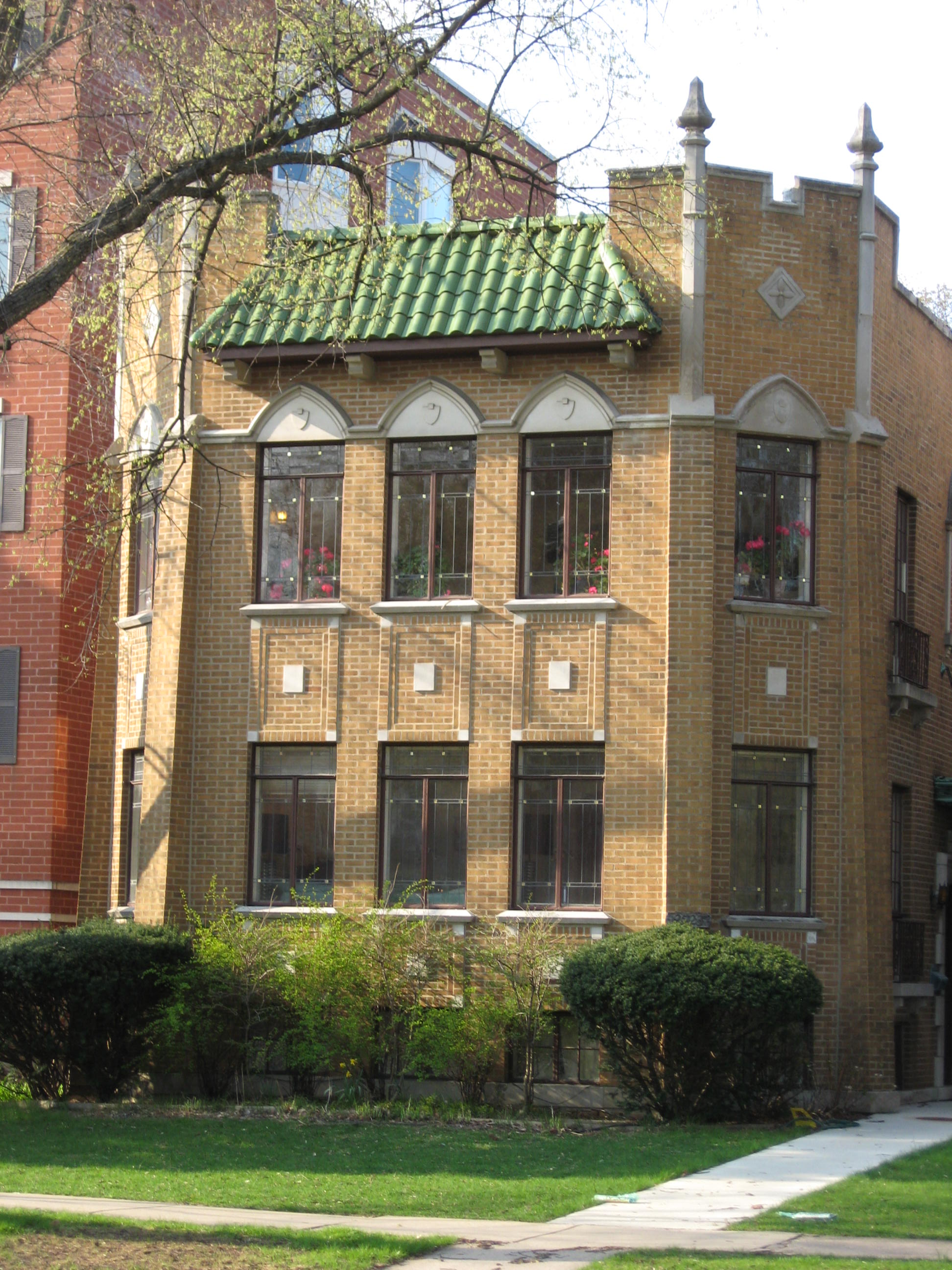
2523 Central Street
