= Evanston Lakeshore Historic District =

Historic district in Illinois, United States

- U.S. National Register of Historic Places
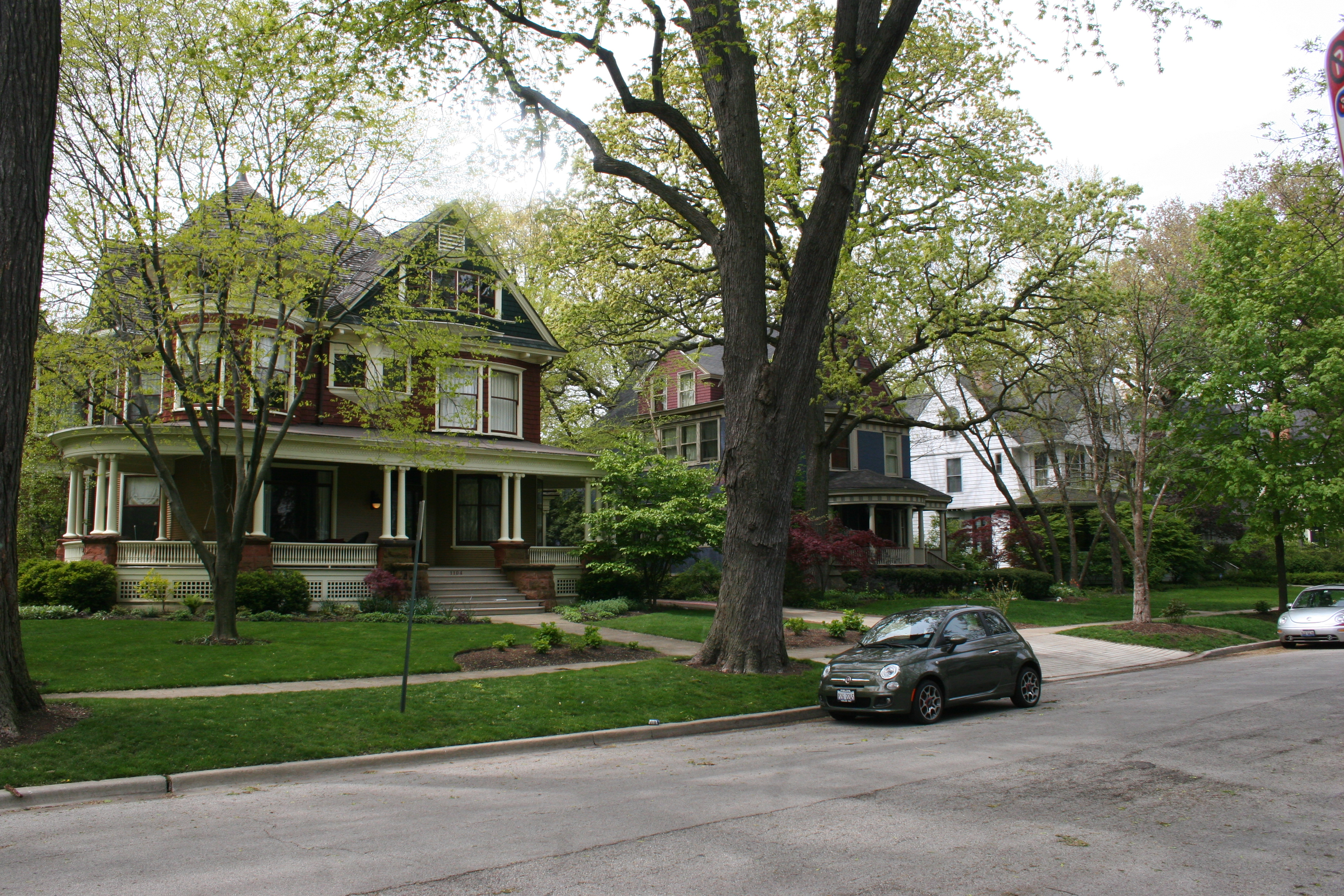

- Location within Chicago metropolitan area Location within Illinois Location within the United States
- Location: Roughly bounded by Northwestern University, Lake Michigan, Calvary Cemetery, and Chicago Ave., Evanston, Illinois
- Coordinates: 42°02′15″N 87°40′30″W
- Area: 360 acres (150 ha)
- NRHP reference No.: 80001353
- Added to NRHP: September 29, 1980

The Evanston Lakeshore Historic District is a residential historic district in Evanston, Illinois. The district encompasses a section of southeast Evanston that was developed in the late nineteenth and early twentieth centuries. As Chicago expanded in the late nineteenth century, its residential development surged past its northern border and into Evanston, causing the suburb to grow considerably. Early laws, including the first municipal zoning law in 1921, restricted development in southeast Evanston to single-family houses. The expense of such houses and the popularity of the location led to the neighborhood becoming dominated by the relatively wealthy. Prominent architectural styles within the district include Italianate, Queen Anne, Tudor Revival, and Georgian Revival.

The district was added to the National Register of Historic Places on September 29, 1980.
