= Building at 923–925 Michigan Avenue =

- U.S. National Register of Historic Places
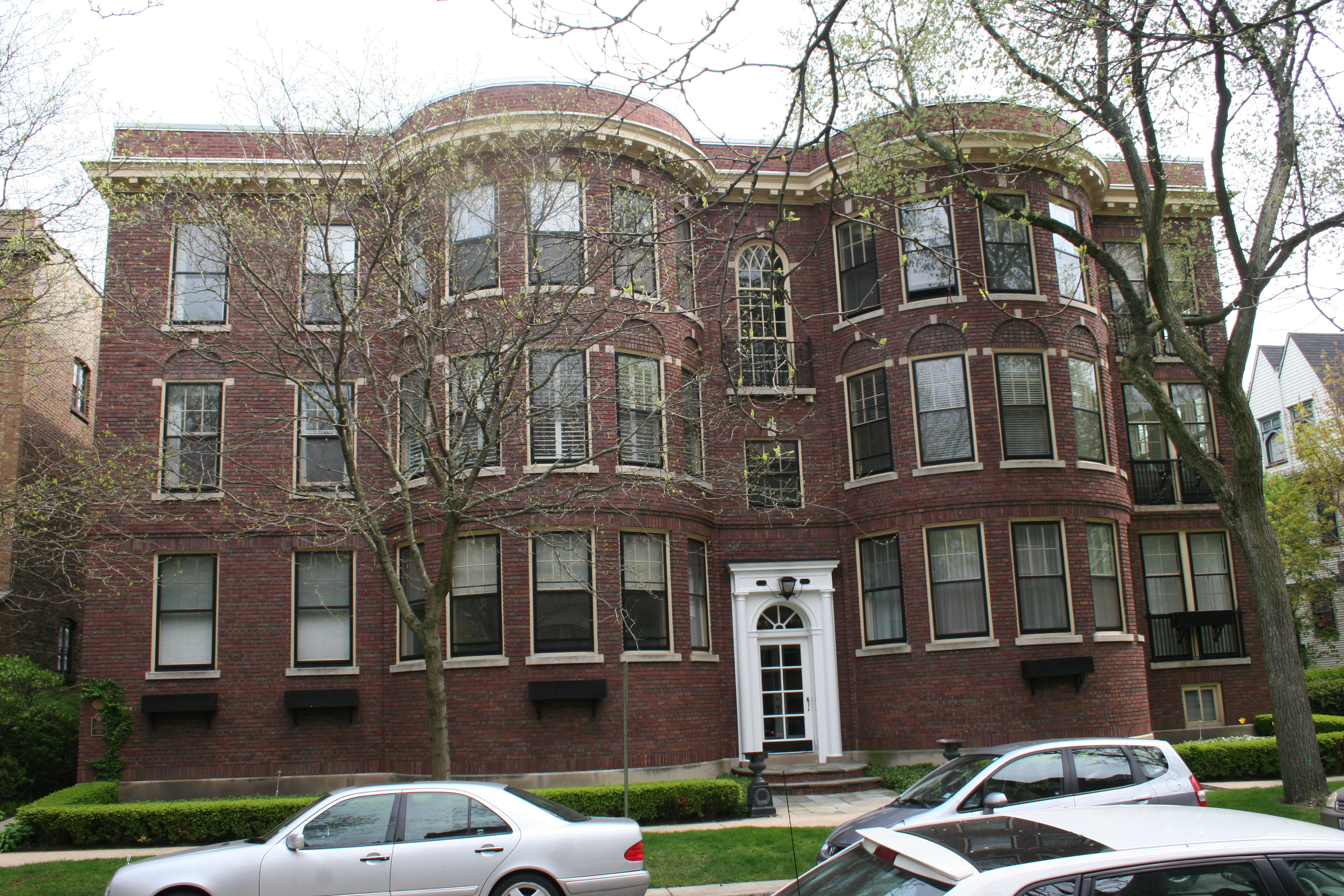
- Building at 923–925 Michigan Ave. in 2012

- Location within Chicago metropolitan area Location within Illinois Location within the United States
- Location: 923–925 Michigan Ave., Evanston, Illinois
- Coordinates: 42°02′05″N 87°40′23″W
- Area: 0.5 acres (0.20 ha)
- Built: 1916
- Architect: Robert De Golyer
- Architectural style: Federal Revival
- MPS: Suburban Apartment Buildings in Evanston TR
- NRHP reference No.: 84000953
- Added to NRHP: March 15, 1984

The Building at 923–925 Michigan Avenue is a historic apartment building in Evanston, Illinois. The three-story brick building was built in 1916. Architect Robert De Golyer, the architect for several other apartment buildings in Evanston and Chicago, designed the building, moving in once it was complete. The building features bow windows, pilasters and a fanlight around the entrance, and a dentillated cornice. Each of the building's six apartments included living rooms with fireplaces, sun porches, maids' rooms, vacuum systems, and access to heated garages.

The building was added to the National Register of Historic Places on March 15, 1984.
