= Castle Tower Apartments =

- U.S. National Register of Historic Places
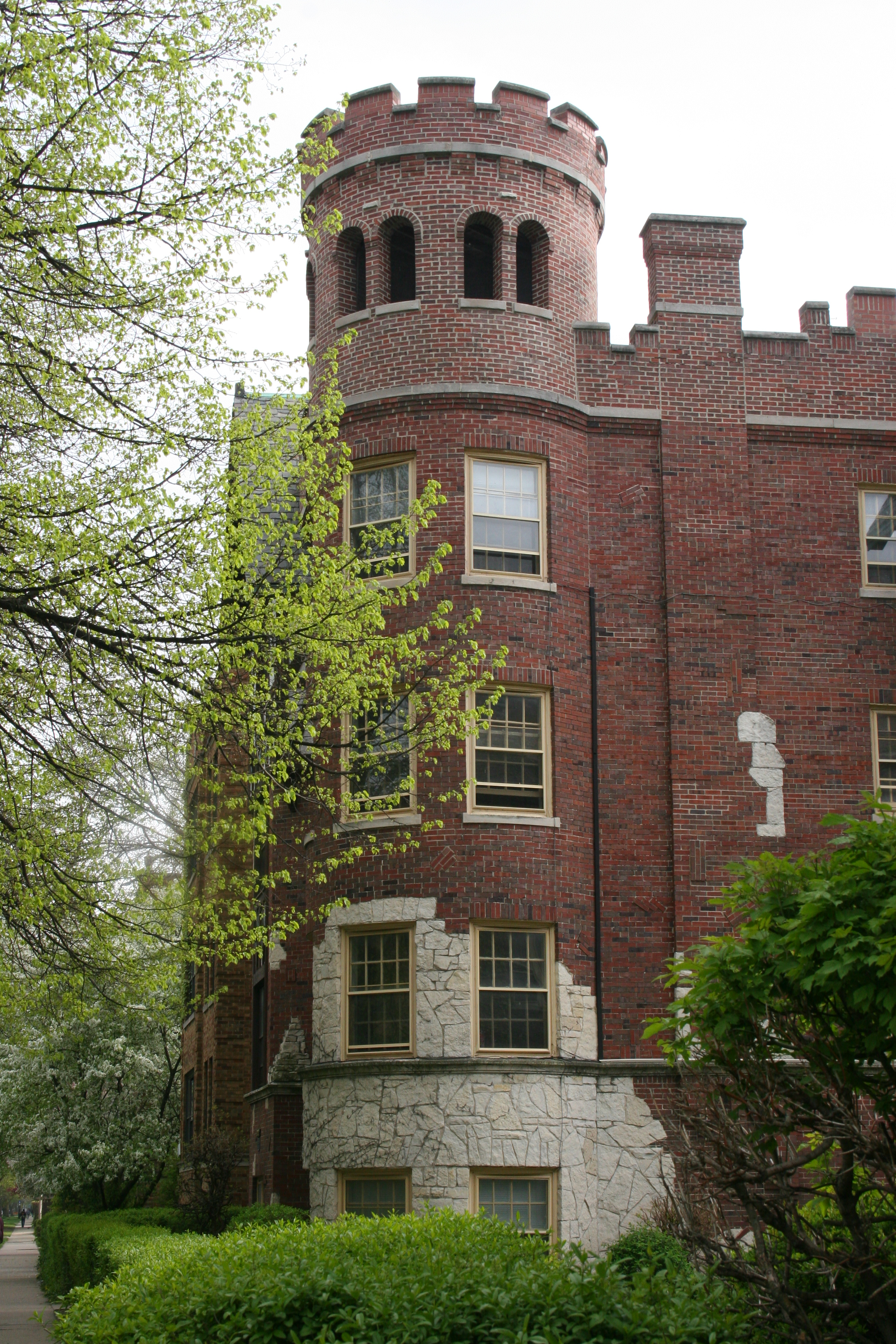
- Castle Tower Apartments in 2012

- Location within Chicago metropolitan area Location within Illinois Location within the United States
- Location: 2212-2226 Sherman Ave., Evanston, Illinois
- Coordinates: 42°03′30″N 87°40′56″W
- Area: 0.7 acres (0.28 ha)
- Built: 1928
- Architect: Cable & Spitz
- Architectural style: Tudor Revival
- MPS: Suburban Apartment Buildings in Evanston TR
- NRHP reference No.: 84000985
- Added to NRHP: March 15, 1984

Castle Tower Apartments is a historic apartment building at 2212-2226 Sherman Avenue in Evanston, Illinois. The three-story building was built in 1928. The building has a "U" shape, a common form for apartment buildings in Evanston, with a large courtyard in the middle. Architects Cable & Spitz designed the building in the Tudor Revival style. Their design includes several rounded and square towers along the sides of the building, crenellation on the towers and roofline, sections of half-timbering, and patches of limestone on the otherwise brick exterior.

The building was added to the National Register of Historic Places on March 15, 1984.
