= Building at 1401–1407 Elmwood Avenue =

- U.S. National Register of Historic Places
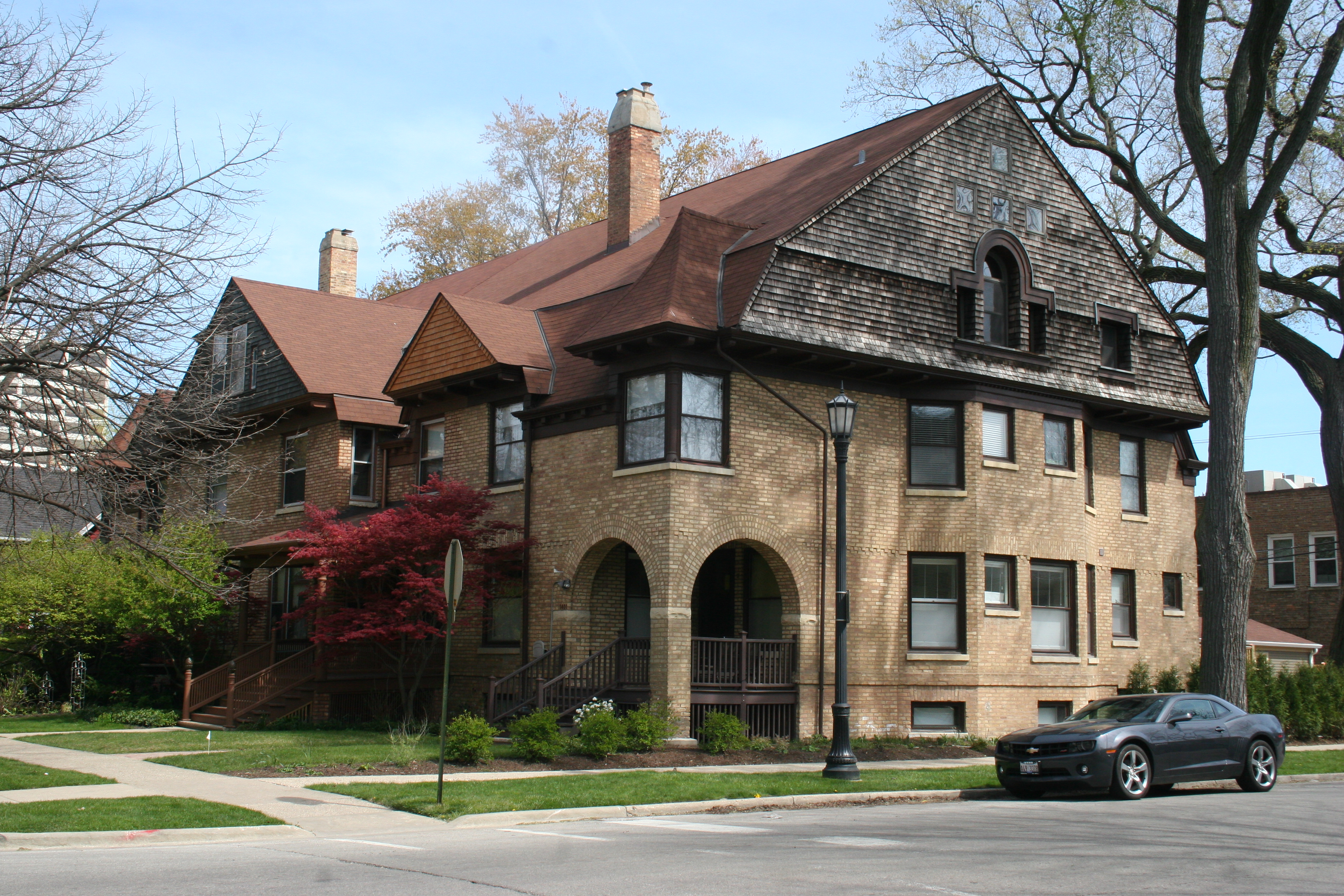

- Location within Chicago metropolitan area Location within Illinois Location within the United States
- Location: 1401–1407 Elmwood Ave., Evanston, Illinois
- Coordinates: 42°02′35″N 87°41′00″W
- Area: 0.3 acres (0.12 ha)
- Built: 1890
- Architect: Stephen A. Jennings
- MPS: Suburban Apartment Buildings in Evanston TR
- NRHP reference No.: 84000973
- Added to NRHP: March 15, 1984

The Building at 1401–1407 Elmwood Avenue is a historic rowhouse building at 1401–1407 Elmwood Avenue in Evanston, Illinois. Built in 1890, the three-story building includes four rowhouse units. It was one of several rowhouses built in the late nineteenth century in Evanston; these rowhouses were a precursor to Evanston's many suburban apartments, which also offered house-like living in a multi-unit setting. Architect Stephen A. Jennings, a prominent Evanston architect who designed several of Evanston's large single-family homes, designed the building. The building's design includes a large central gable, enclosed porches supported by arches on the corner units, porches with shed roofs on the central units, and a bracketed wooden cornice.

The building was added to the National Register of Historic Places on March 15, 1984.
