= The Greenwood =

- U.S. National Register of Historic Places
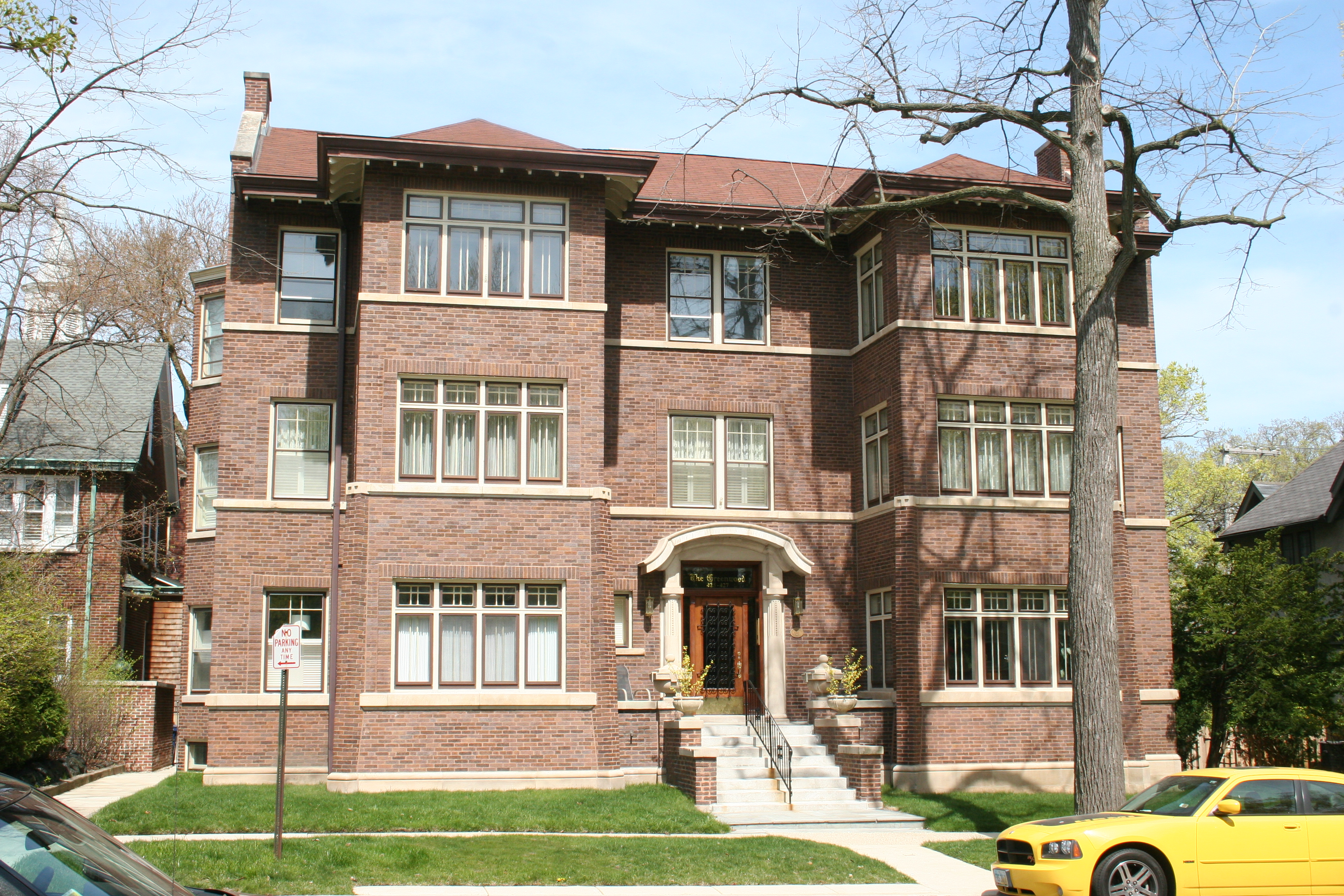
- The Greenwood in 2012

- Location within Chicago metropolitan area Location within Illinois Location within the United States
- Location: 425 Greenwood St., Evanston, Illinois
- Coordinates: 42°02′35″N 87°40′44″W
- Area: 0.2 acres (0.081 ha)
- Built: 1912
- Architect: Thomas McCall
- Architectural style: Prairie School
- MPS: Suburban Apartment Buildings in Evanston TR
- NRHP reference No.: 84000993
- Added to NRHP: March 15, 1984

The Greenwood is a historic apartment building at 425-427 Greenwood Street in Evanston, Illinois. Built in 1912, the three-story building is set in a neighborhood of single-family houses. Architect Thomas McCall designed the building in the Prairie School style. The building features an overall horizontal emphasis, casement and bay windows, stained glass, and overhanging eaves. Its six apartments have a railroad plan, in which rooms are organized along a narrow central hallway.

The building was added to the National Register of Historic Places on March 15, 1984.
