= Building at 999 Michigan, 200 Lee =

- U.S. National Register of Historic Places
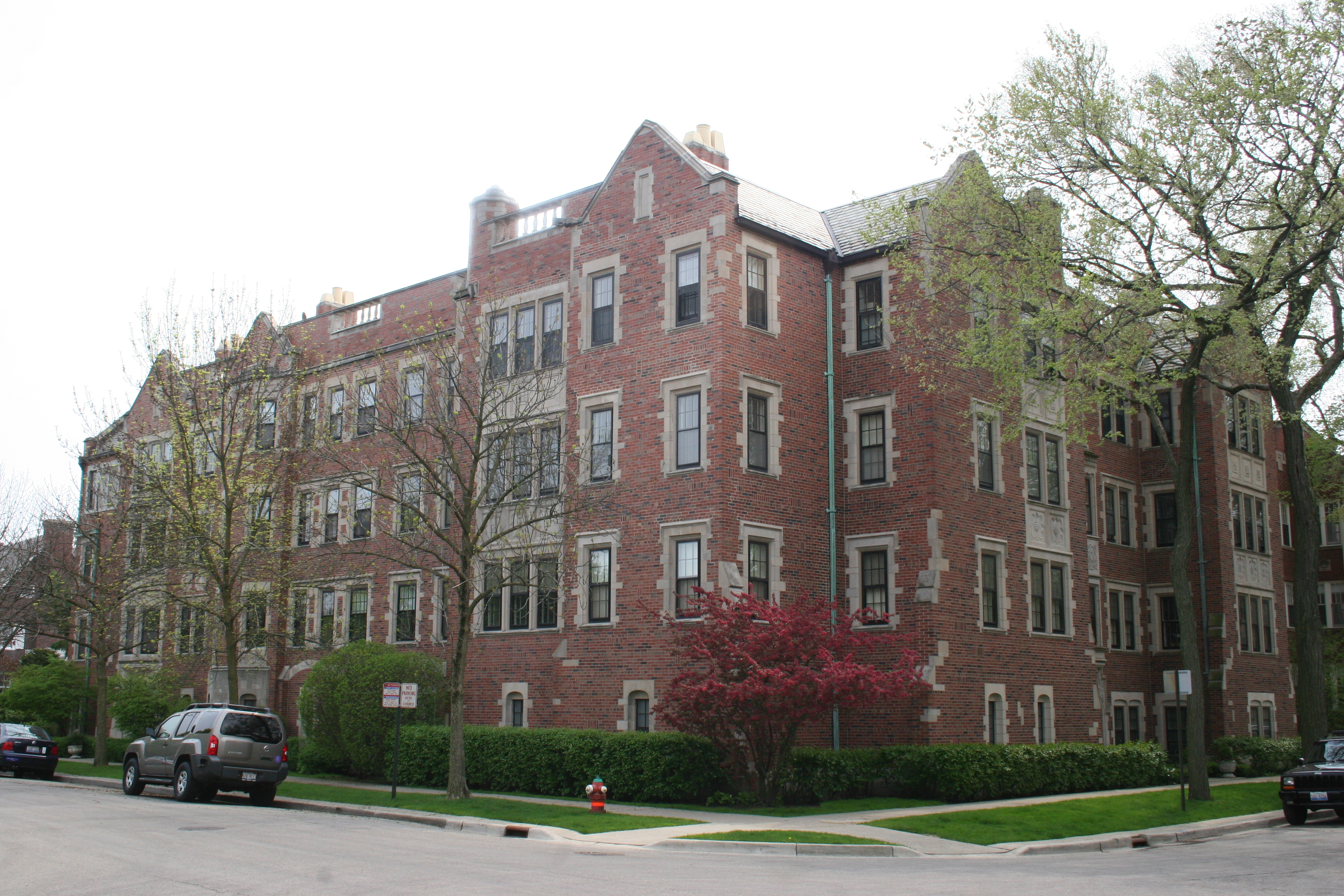
- Building in 2012

- Location within Chicago metropolitan area Location within Illinois Location within the United States
- Location: 999 Michigan Ave., 200 Lee St., Evanston, Illinois
- Coordinates: 42°02′08″N 87°40′24″W
- Area: 0.3 acres (0.12 ha)
- Built: 1927
- Architect: McNally & Quinn
- Architectural style: Tudor Revival
- MPS: Suburban Apartment Buildings in Evanston TR
- NRHP reference No.: 84000958
- Added to NRHP: March 15, 1984

The Building at 999 Michigan, 200 Lee is a historic apartment building at the southeast corner of Michigan Avenue and Lee Street in Evanston, Illinois. The three-story brick building was built in 1927. Architects McNally and Quinn designed the Tudor Revival building. The building's design features arched entrances, projecting bays, limestone window moldings, decorative gargoyles, and a parapet with several gables. The Tudor design continues in the building's interior, which includes wood panels in its lobby, wrought iron balustrades on its staircases, and marble fireplaces in the apartments themselves.

The building was added to the National Register of Historic Places on March 15, 1984.

Some of the apartments contain three or four bedrooms; often a maid's room with an attached bath. This building was one of the first apartment buildings to follow the many single-family homes built to capitalize on the lakefront view.
