= Buildings at 1104–1110 Seward =

- U.S. National Register of Historic Places
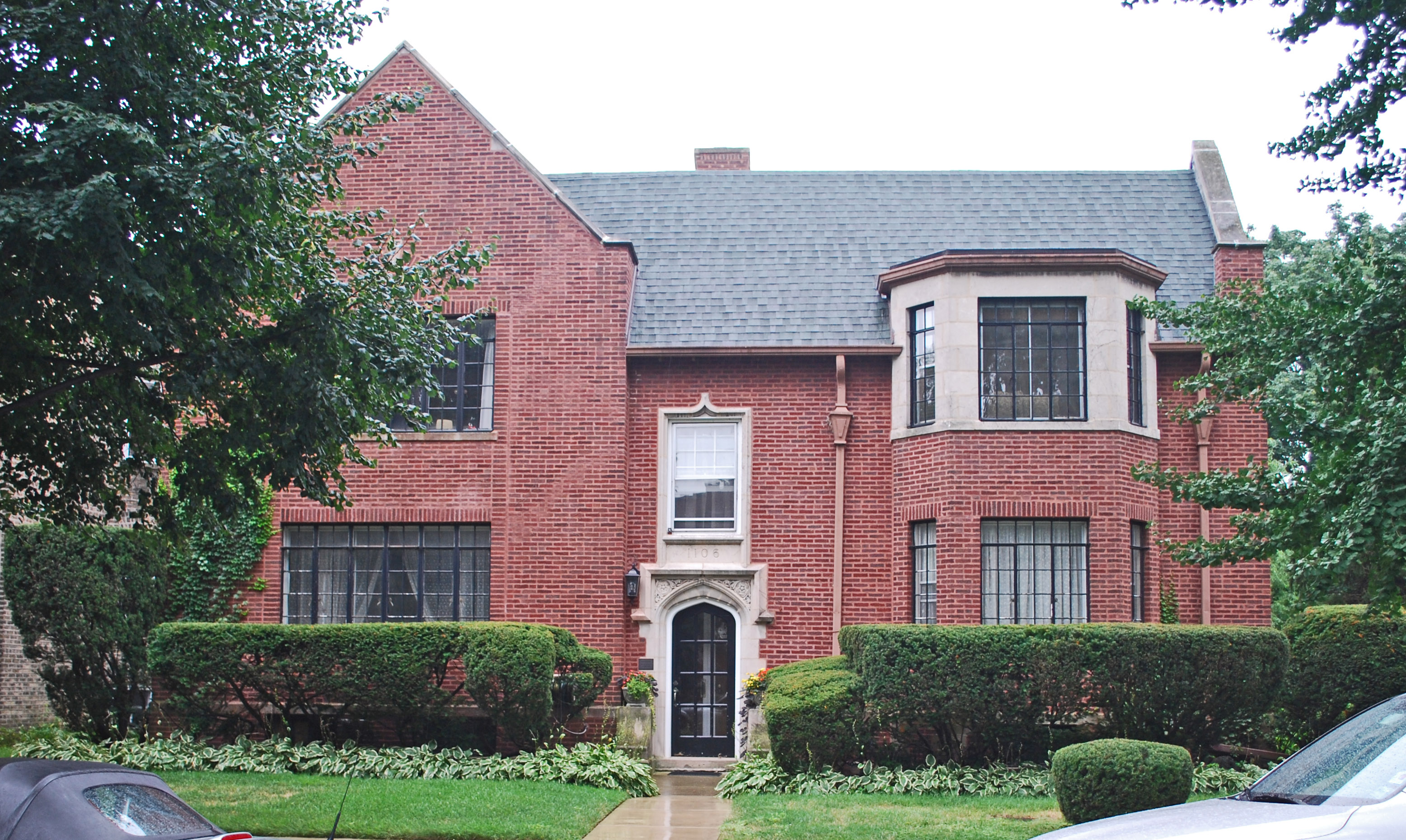
- 1104–1106 Seward

- Location within Chicago metropolitan area Location within Illinois Location within the United States
- Location: 1104–1110 Seward, Evanston, Illinois
- Coordinates: 42°01′44″N 87°41′16″W
- Area: less than one acre
- Built: 1927
- Architect: Van Gunten & Van Gunten
- Architectural style: Tudor Revival
- MPS: Suburban Apartment Buildings in Evanston TR
- NRHP reference No.: 86001743
- Added to NRHP: September 2, 1986

The Buildings at 1104–1110 Seward are two identical apartment buildings in Evanston, Illinois. Both buildings are four-unit apartments built in 1927. Architects Van Gunten & Van Gunten designed the buildings in the Tudor Revival style. The buildings' designs are meant to resemble large homes, an unusual form not seen in any of Evanston's other residential apartments. Each design features a brick exterior, a Tudor arched stone entrance, a two-story bay window, and a gable roof.

The buildings were added to the National Register of Historic Places on September 2, 1986.
