= South Bruny National Park =

National park in Tasmania, Australia

- IUCN category II (national park)
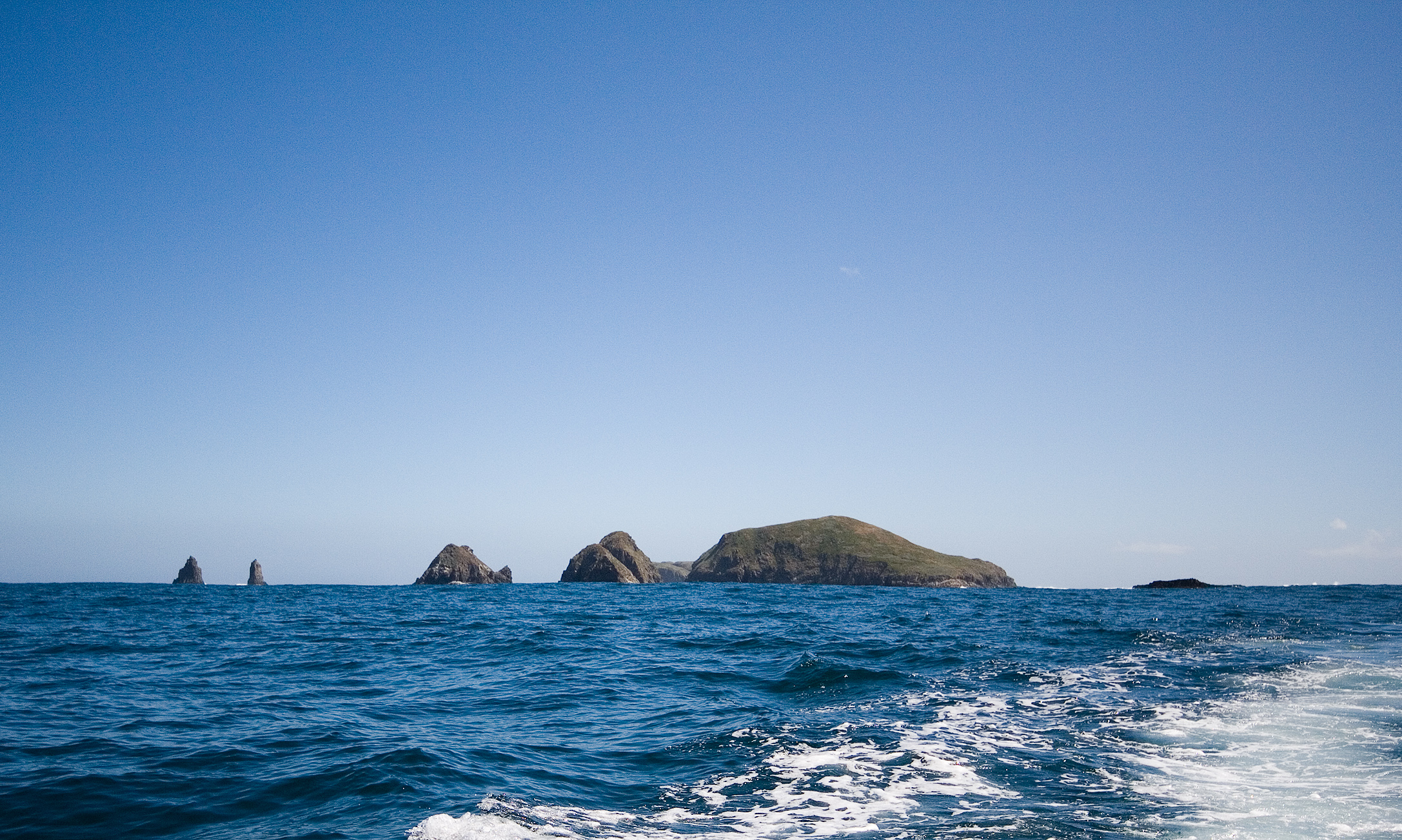
- The Friars

- Location within Tasmania
- Interactive map of South Bruny National Park
- Location: Tasmania
- Nearest city: Kingston
- Coordinates: 43°21′00″S 147°22′16″E
- Area: 50.59 km^{2} (19.53 sq mi)
- Established: 1997
- Visitors: 9200 (in 1997)
- Governing body: Tasmania Parks and Wildlife Service
- Website: Official website

The South Bruny National Park is a national park located on Bruny Island, Tasmania, Australia, about 50 kilometres (31 mi) south of Hobart. The park contains the Cape Bruny Lighthouse. The highest point of the park is Mount Bruny at 504 metres (1,654 ft).

== History ==
The park also embraces the Labillardiere Peninsula, named in honour of the French botanist Jacques Labillardière, author of the first general flora of Australia and a member of Bruni d'Entrecasteaux's expedition. The Nuenonne people once occupied South Bruny and there are several cultural sites around the national park, all of which are protected and some of which are publicized. Dolerite cliffs categorize part of the dramatic coastline, with continuous expanses of beaches from Fluted Cape to the southern tip, continuing around Cloudy Bay, and encompass the whole southern part of Great Taylors Bay. South Bruny was declared a National Park in 1997, mostly for its coastal scenery, as well as Aboriginal and historic heritage and to protect a number of threatened species endemic to the area. The park has become a popular tourist destination enhanced by its abundant birdlife and coastal heathlands. A number of smaller islands were also reserved for their ecological significance including Partridge Island, Green Island and The Friars.

== Flora ==
Plant communities in the park are of high conservation value due to the occurrence of geographically significant species endemic to the island and not protected by reserves or parks elsewhere in Tasmania. Much of the park's vegetation comprises dry sclerophyll communities such as eucalypt woodland as well as heathland and coastal communities. There are also small patches of wet eucalypt forest and temperate rainforest. Common coastal plants include she-oaks and casuarinas (Allocasuarina), which have a high tolerance to salt spray and wind. The national park contains several rare, endemic orchid species including the endangered chestnut leek orchid (Prasophyllum castaneum) and the pretty leek orchid (Prasophyllum pulchellum), both of which are of high ecological significance due to their rare occurrence. These species generally occur in heathland communities which are greatly diverse and are of high conservation significance. The pretty leek orchid thrives in damp heathland and is so rare that the largest of the five known populations consists of fifty individuals. Several other heath species are classified as rare and vulnerable including the juniper wattle (Acacia ulicifolia), variable smoke bush (Conospermum hookeri), and the yellow onion orchid (Microtis atrata).

Eucalyptus forests within the national park play an important role in creating habitat for many species of insects, birds and mammals. Common species are brown-top stringy bark (Eucalyptus obliqua) with pockets of white gum (Eucalyptus viminalis), blue gum (Eucalyptus globulus) and white peppermint (Eucalyptus pulchella). The eyebright (Euphrasia fragosa) is another species of particular note; the park is one of the few places the plant occurs with only three other known populations, and is the only place where it is protected in a national park or reserve. The eyebright is a small flowering perennial occurring in open woodland and is highly vulnerable to disturbance where it exists on vehicle tracks and grazing areas.

== Fauna ==
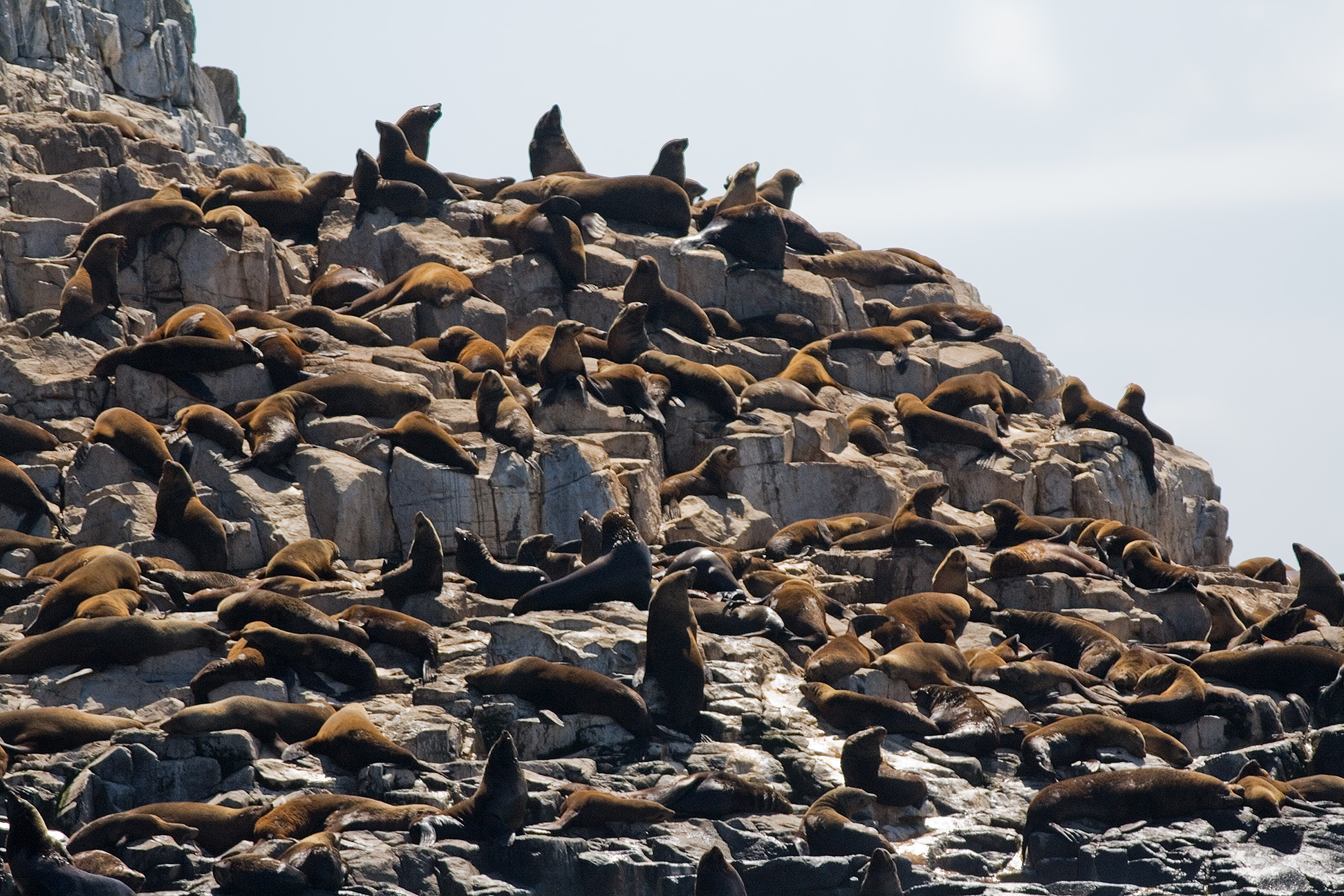
Australian fur seals in the park

Common mammals in the park include the Bennett's wallaby, common brushtail possum and Tasmanian pademelon. Bennett's wallaby is fairly common throughout Tasmania; however, the national park protects a small population of unusual white wallabies. The Bennett's wallaby, also referred to as the red-necked wallaby, can be found grazing on grasslands around the Fluted Cape area and are nocturnal. The eastern quoll has also been reported. Spotted-tail quolls, Tasmanian devils and common wombats have always been absent from the island. All twelve of Tasmania's endemic bird species are present, notably the forty-spotted pardalote for which the island is the main stronghold. Little penguins and hooded plovers breed along the coast. Reptiles recorded include the tiger snake, lowland copperhead and white-lipped snake. A colony of Australian fur seals occupy The Friars, rocks that form the most southerly part of the park that the seals use as haul-outs. The birdlife of the park is of particular significance due to the varied habitats suitable for a rich variety of species.

=== Bird life ===
Several birds of prey exist in South Bruny National Park, including the white-bellied sea eagle, the Tasmanian wedge-tailed eagle and the grey goshawk. The goshawk is endangered and very rare, and is found on Partridge Island, part of the national park. Partridge island also provides a secluded refuge and ideal habitat for a little penguin breeding colony. Nearby Green Island is an important breeding site for kelp gulls. The park also supports the ground parrot, which survives in the open heathland.

==== Forty-spotted pardalote ====
The forty-spotted pardalote is one of the rarest birds in Australia, and is classified as endangered. The distribution of the species has declined over the last century with the bird thought to no longer occupy many parts of Tasmania where it was once prevalent; two populations are now known on Bruny Island. The pardalote’s rely on the white gum (Eucalyptus viminalis) for survival and feed on small insects and manna (sap like sugary substance produced by white gums). The pardalote prefers old growth hollows and logs for breeding and nesting, sites of newer growth have shown to be unsuitable with the pardalote showing disinterest.

The numbers of forty-spotted pardalotes are still declining despite a number of rescue efforts. There are several factors preventing their abundance such as low dispersal, specialized diet and habitat, and competition with other birds that have established following land clearing. The primary threat to the species is clearing resulting in habitat loss; the clearing of dry sclerophyll forest and the key white gum trees along coastal areas has seen these specialists decline in numbers. Over the past ten years habitat destruction has been negligible, particularly with the declaration of the South Bruny National Park and other reserves on Bruny Island, however habitat fragmentation is a persisting issue, as is territory competition with other edge species. A challenge for future conservation of the species is maintaining habitat connectivity and ensuring the persistence of white gums as a core habitat tree. There have been two national recovery plans with the main management objectives being to reestablish white gums, assess more areas for protection, increase knowledge of the species through monitoring, and to educate the community and visitors.

==== Swift parrot ====
The swift parrot is another key species protected by the park; a migratory bird which travels between south-eastern mainland Australia and Tasmania. Adventure Bay and Cloudy Bay on South Bruny Island have been identified in research for the Tasmanian Department of Primary Industries, Water and Environment as key sites for the species. The bird nests primarily in blue gums (Eucalyptus globulus) relying on the trees flowers for its breeding success, with black gums (Eucalyptus ovata) also noted as an important food source. Swift parrots nest in tree hollows, usually on upper slopes and ridges in dry eucalypt forest within 10 kilometres (6.2 mi) of the coast, with the total population being estimated at approximately 1,000 pairs.

The decline of the species has been mainly attributed to habitat loss through clearing, resulting in fragmentation and the change in habitat structure. Another threat to the swift parrot is predation by sugar gliders on the mainland, hence why it is so important for the birds to seek refuge on offshore islands where they can breed safely. Some, but not all of the breeding and nesting sites are encompassed by the South Bruny Island National Park, with some land being privately owned and other land forestry owned- which operations are still active on Bruny Island. Approximately 80% of swift parrot habitat occurs outside of protected areas, which is detrimental in the protection of the bird due to its migratory nature, with habitat connectivity being key. The South Bruny National Park offers a vital sanctuary for the parrot by protecting one of its core breeding areas. Management plans have been developed and implemented in the recovery of the bird (the most recent released in 2011), proving successful in increasing the understanding of habitat requirements, improving forestry management, and has helped to establish community and volunteer networks.

== Environmental threats ==
Tourism of Bruny Island has been driven by a demand for natural experiences, which has had both positive and negative impacts on the island. The use of boats and four-wheel drives is popular, and the increased number of vehicles on beaches is having negative implications. A high number of vehicles travel along the Cloudy Bay beaches, which raises concerns for the success of breeding birds such as the hooded plover. Other associated problems with beach driving are loss of vegetation above the high tide mark, soil disturbance, impacts on other ground nesting birds, and the compaction of sand and soil which can have entire ecosystem implications. These dunal communities are also facing decline due to exotic species and legacy impacts of previous human use. Island locals have highlighted that the reason Bruny Island is so attractive is because of its unspoilt natural values, and increased numbers of tourists jeopardizes this, putting pressure on the island and its resources.

The park layout consists of a narrow coastal strip which is reduced to 50 m wide in parts, connecting three different areas which means the park cannot be managed in isolation from its context and wider environmental setting. This poses the threat of losing habitat connectivity as some important habitat areas are on adjacent private property. Collaboration with landowners on species management is therefore important, as is community education to encourage this.

Feral cats are thought to be the most significant predator on the island, with domestic cats and dogs also known to kill wildlife. Hooded plovers and terns that nest along Cloudy Bay’s beaches are particularly vulnerable to predation by cats. Approximately 80% of the feral cats on Bruny Island carry toxoplasmosis (a parasite which infects and kills many animals when bitten), of which marsupials are particularly susceptible. Competition with other invasive species is also of concern, for example the endangered Tasmanian masked owl (Tyto novaehollandiae castanops) is forced to compete with feral honeybees and starlings for nest hollows.

== Management ==
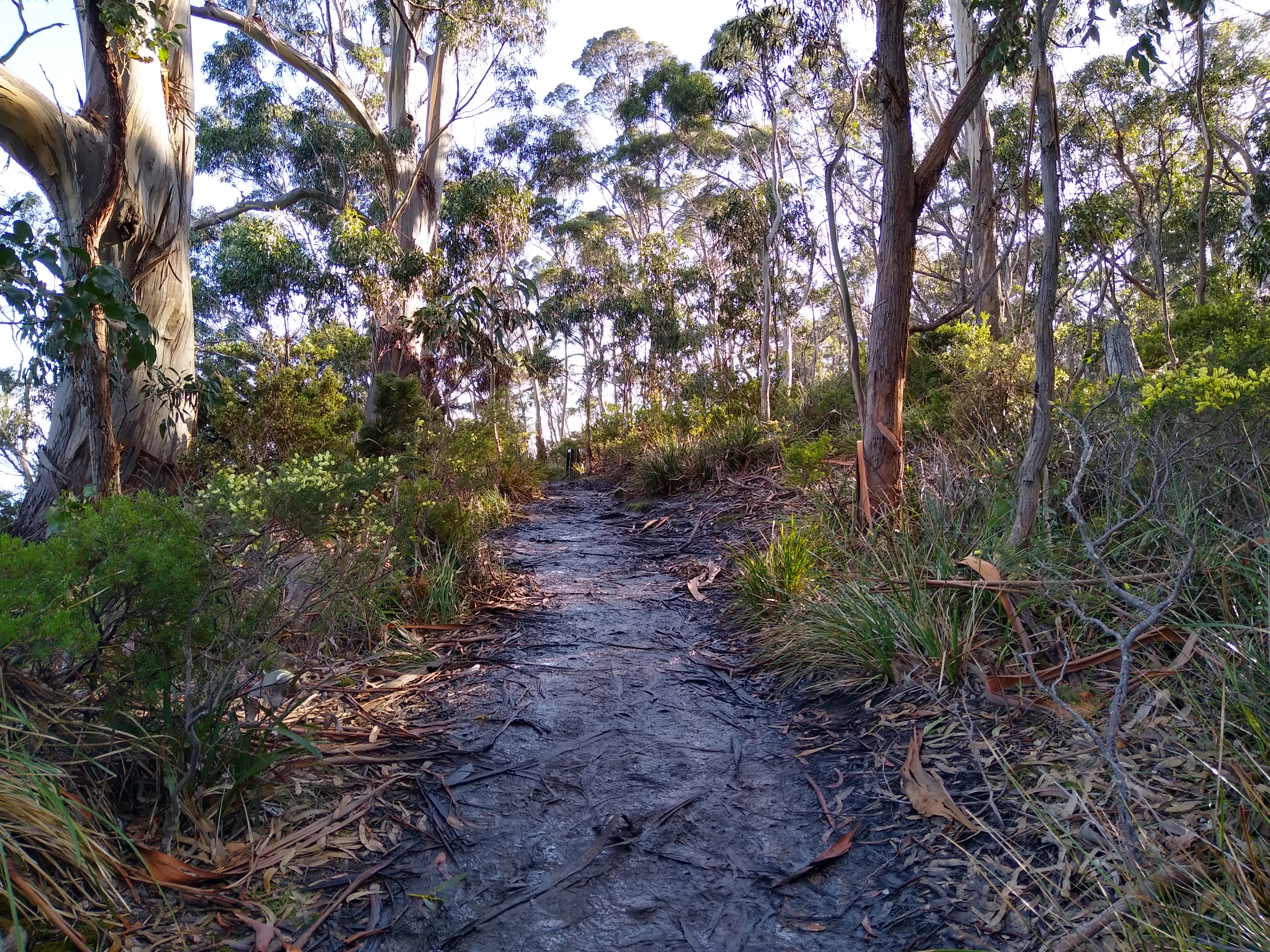
A trail in South Bruny National Park

The park offers pristine beaches, a scenic environment, and the opportunity for people to relax in the close proximity of wildlife. Visitors can appreciate the natural setting and learn about the parks different environments, with the aim of supporting South Bruny's conservation values. To continue to offer and achieve this, management objectives have been established, along with a management plan. Specific management actions have been outlined including erosion control and rehabilitation where vehicles access the beach at Cloudy Corner, as well as minimizing impacts of visitors in limiting numbers to those that are ecologically sustainable.

The Commonwealth Environment Protection and Biodiversity Conservation Act (1999) is at the heart of the federal government’s environmental legislation, providing the legal basis for management and protection of Australia’s threatened species and communities. The South Bruny National Park Management Plan implemented in 2000 aims to protect, maintain and monitor the natural flora and fauna diversity, particularly threatened species. Only species native to the park will be used in any rehabilitation works, and habitat areas for beach breeding birds are to be left undisturbed during breeding season. The parks priorities for flora conservation include sites of the eyebright, old growth forests and grassy forest that provide habitat to the swift parrot and forty-spotted pardalote. Species such as the eyebright and several flowering orchids rely on the disturbance of vegetation and thrive on regular burns which the park has been exposed to for thousands of years. Regular burns do occur in the park; between 2000 and 2010 most of South Bruny has undergone some form of burn off as part of the national park's burning regime. A management challenge is meeting the needs of these individual species, which often differ from one another. The Weed Management Act (1999) specifies the framework for Tasmania’s weed management, aiming for the control and eradication of declared weeds providing a sustainable approach to Tasmania’s weed management. Reducing the risk of introduction or reintroduction of weeds is also a priority, improving awareness and knowledge of weed issues throughout Bruny Island, with declared weeds carrying legally enforceable action plans for their control. Continued research and monitoring of environmental issues throughout Bruny Island and the National Park will provide the basis for appropriate future management.

== Features of South Bruny National Park ==
- Blanche Rock
- Cape Bruny Lighthouse
- Cloudy Bay
- Courts Island
- The Friars
- Partridge Island

== See also ==
- Protected areas of Tasmania
