= Actaeon Island =

Island in Tasmania, Australia

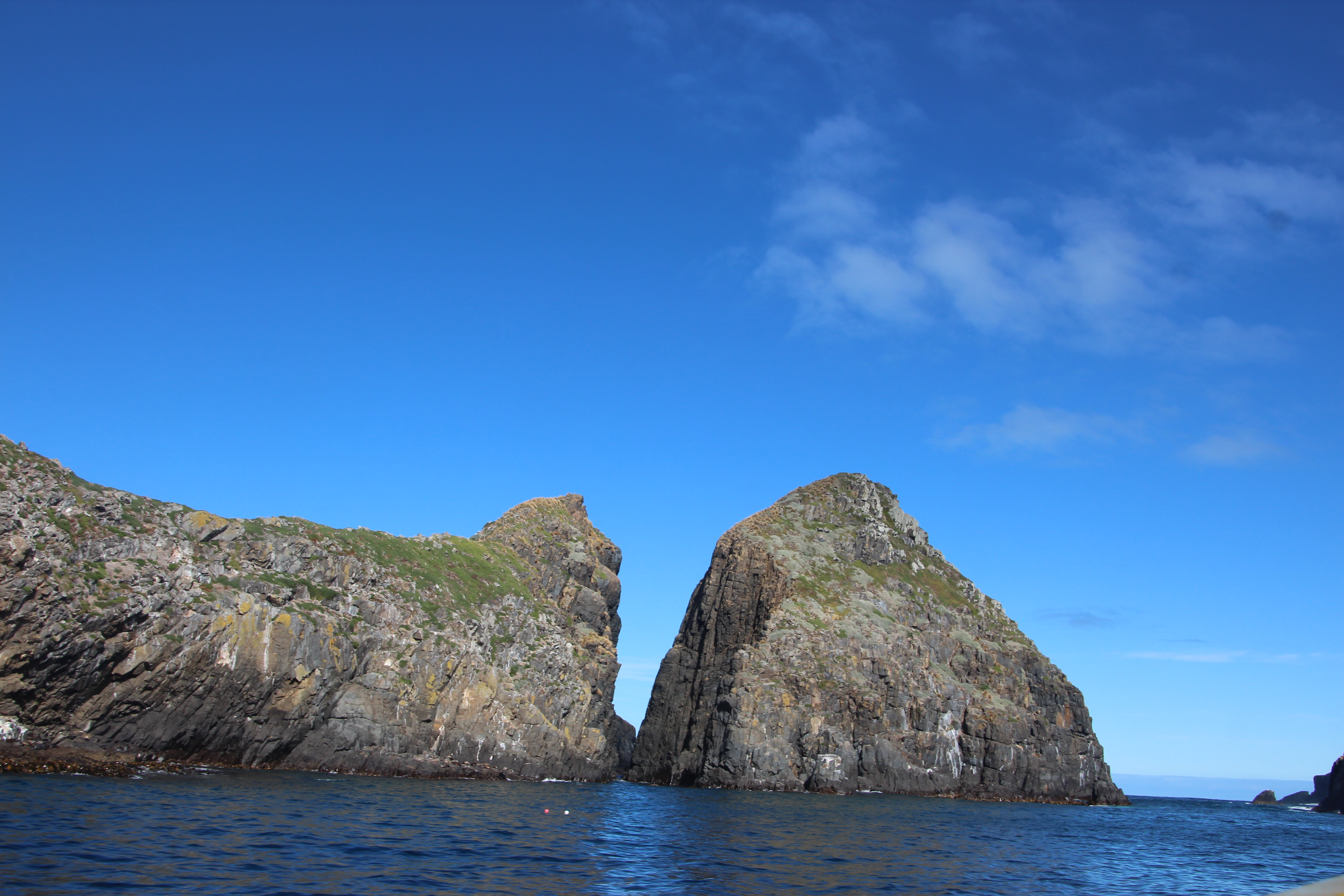
- The Friars are four steep dolerite rocks, part of the Actaeon Island Group, lying close to Bruny Island, at the southern entrance to the D'Entrecasteaux Channel. They form part of South Bruny National Park and host a male Australian fur seal colony.

- Location within Tasmania

Geography
- Location: D'Entrecasteaux Channel
- Coordinates: 43°31′S 146°59′E
- Archipelago: Actaeon Island Group
- Area: 15.65 ha (38.7 acres)
- Highest elevation: 14 m (46 ft)

Administration
- Australia
- State: Tasmania

Actaeon Island, part of the Actaeon Island Group, is a 15.65-hectare (38.7-acre) dolerite island and game reserve located at the southern entrance to the D'Entrecasteaux Channel between Bruny Island and the mainland, that lies close to the south-eastern coast of Tasmania, Australia. The island is named for the ship Actaeon, which wrecked there in 1822.

There is a navigation beacon on the highest point, 14 metres (46 ft) AHD.

== Actaeon Island Group ==
The Actaeon Island Group consists of:

- Actaeon Island
- Blanche Rock
- Courts Island
- Southport Island
- Sterile Island
- The Friars
- The Images

== Fauna ==
Recorded breeding seabird and wader species are the little penguin, short-tailed shearwater and sooty oystercatcher. European rabbits occur on the island and seals occasionally haul-out there. The metallic skink is present. The endangered orange-bellied parrot is historically from the Actaeon Island.

== See also ==
- List of islands of Tasmania
