= Friar (disambiguation) =

A friar is a term for a member of a religious order. Friar or Friars may also refer to:

- The Friars (club), American student club
- The Friars (Tasmania), Tasmanian island group
- Aylesford Priory, Kent, England, also known as The Friars
- Providence Friars, Division I sports teams of Providence College
- Amauris, genus of nymphalid butterflies sometimes referred to as friars
- Ken Friar (1934–2026), British football executive

== See also ==
- San Diego Padres, baseball team sometimes referred to as the Friars
- Friars Club (disambiguation)
