= Australian fur seal =

Australian fur seal may refer to:

- Arctocephalus pusillus doriferus, subspecies of Arctocephalus pusillus, found in southeastern Australia and Tasmania
- Arctocephalus forsteri, also known as the New Zealand fur seal, found in southwestern Australia, Tasmania and New Zealand
