= Cape Bruny Lighthouse =

Lighthouse in Tasmania, Australia

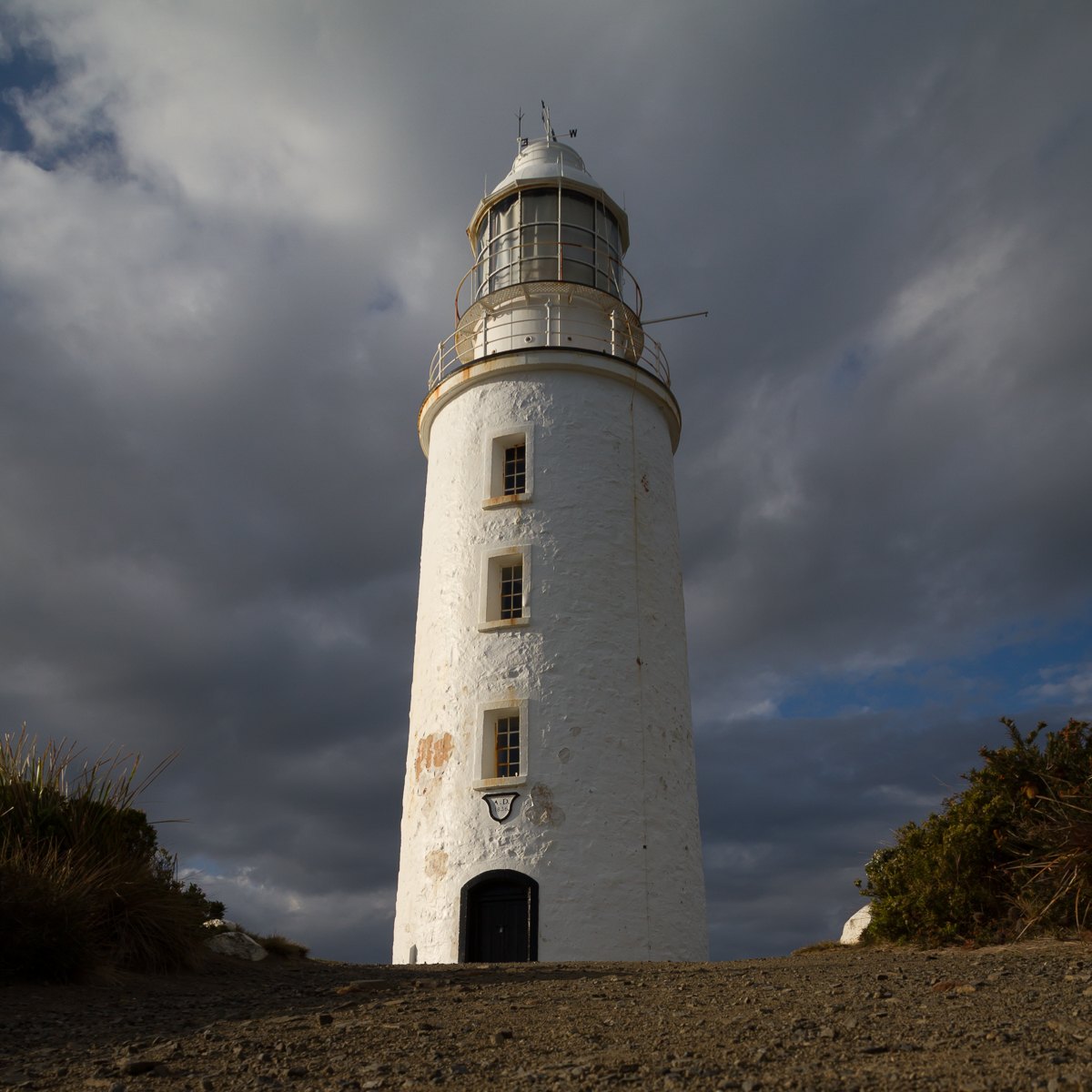
- Cape Bruny Lighthouse in 2015
- Location: Bruny Island; Tasmania; Australia
- Coordinates: 43°29′28.1″S 147°08′32.0″E

Tower
- Constructed: 1838; 187 years ago
- Construction: rubble masonry tower fiberglass tower (light tower)
- Height: 13 metres (43 ft); 5 metres (16 ft) (light tower)
- Shape: conical tower with double balcony and lantern
- Markings: white tower and lantern
- Power source: solar power, diesel engine
- Operator: South Bruny National Park
- Heritage: listed on the Tasmanian Heritage Register

Light
- First lit: 1838
- Deactivated: 1996 (replaced by nearby light tower)
- Focal height: 93 metres (305 ft); 105 metres (344 ft) (light tower)
- Intensity: 1,400,000 cd (light tower)
- Range: 26 nautical miles (48 km; 30 mi) (light tower)
- Characteristic: Fl W 10s. (light tower)

The Cape Bruny Lighthouse is an inactive lighthouse located at the southern tip of Bruny Island, Tasmania, Australia.

== Features and location ==
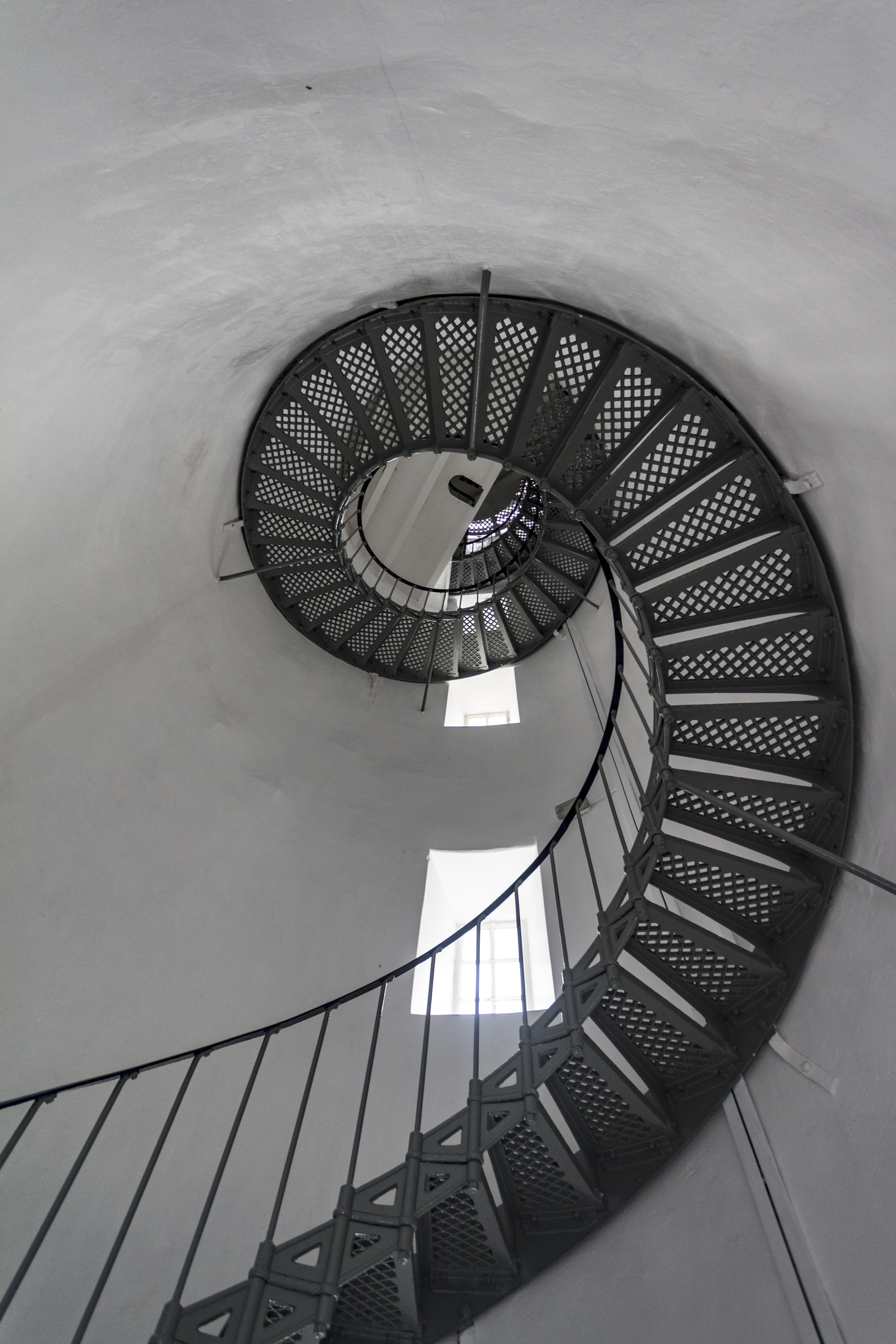
Stairs in Cape Bruny Lighthouse

It is the second oldest extant lighthouse tower in Australia, as well as having the longest (158 years) history of being continuously staffed. It was first lit in March 1838 and was eventually decommissioned on 6 August 1996.

The project was commissioned by Governor George Arthur in 1835 after a series of shipwrecks south of Bruny Island and construction began in April 1836. The lighthouse was built by convict labour using locally quarried dolerite over two years. When first lit in March 1838 it was Tasmania's third lighthouse and Australia's fourth.

Cape Bruny was initially illuminated by a Wilkins lantern, consuming one pint of sperm whale oil per hour. In 1892, whale oil was replaced by better quality colza oil. In 1903 the original staircase was replaced with a cast-iron staircase and the Wilkins lantern replaced with a Chance Brothers lantern; both remain in the tower today. The lighthouse was converted to electricity only in 1959.

In December 2000 the light station area, including the lighthouse, became part of the South Bruny National Park. The lightstation was maintained by a permanent caretaker until 2011 when the Parks & Wildlife established a rotational volunteer caretaker program. Volunteers live on-site in the caretakers cottage for four-week periods, assisting with repairs and general maintenance.

In June 2012, the Tasmanian government sought expressions of interest from commercial operators wishing to take over the operation and management of the Cape Bruny Light Station. No tender was awarded and the site is managed by the Parks & Wildlife Service with assistance from volunteers. Following the tender process, only one company began tours of the South Bruny National Park and Cape Bruny Light Station that takes tourists to visit the Cape Bruny Lightstation, they also operate tours inside the lighthouse tower.

An active light tower is located nearby on a fiberglass construction of 4 metres (13 ft) height. Its light characteristic is "Fl. 10 s", i.e. a white flash every 10 seconds. The lightsource emits from a focal plane at 93 metres (305 ft) above sea level.

== See also ==
- History of Tasmania
- List of lighthouses in Tasmania
