= Cloudy Bay (Tasmania) =

Bight in Tasmania, Australia

Native name: Lunawanna Allonah

Geography
- Location: Tasman Sea
- Coordinates: 43°28′S 147°13′E

Administration
- Australia
- State: Tasmania
- LGA: Kingborough Council

Cloudy Bay is located at the southernmost end of Bruny Island in the Australian state of Tasmania, inside South Bruny National Park.

Shore-based whaling stations operated in the bay in the 1830s.

The bay consists of a 5 kilometre long beach which at one end, facilitates surfing and, at the other, a camping location with toilet facilities. located on West side of cloudy bay lagoon sits Jazz island,

== Environment ==
Cloudy Bay is part of the Cloudy Bay Marine Conservation Area, known for its seagrass and shallow sediment microalgae which support diverse marine life.

== Gallery ==
Looking from the camping location, Cloudy Bay is a quiet and peaceful beach with calm waters and slowly levelling sands.

The beach is surrounded by native Australian plants for its entire 5 kilometre span.
