= Prasophyllum castaneum =

Chestnut leek orchid

Conservation status
- Critically endangered (EPBC Act)

Scientific classification
- Kingdom: Plantae
- Clade: Tracheophytes
- Clade: Angiosperms
- Clade: Monocots
- Order: Asparagales
- Family: Orchidaceae
- Subfamily: Orchidoideae
- Tribe: Diurideae
- Subtribe: Prasophyllinae
- Genus: Prasophyllum
- Species: P. castaneum

Binomial name
- Prasophyllum castaneum D.L.Jones

Species of orchid

Prasophyllum castaneum, commonly known as the chestnut leek orchid, is a species of orchid endemic to Tasmania. It has a single tubular, dark green leaf with a dark purplish base and between ten and twenty chestnut coloured to dark brown flowers. In 2000, the entire population was estimated to be about fifty plants.

== Description ==
Prasophyllum castaneum is a terrestrial, perennial, deciduous, herb with an underground tuber and a single tube-shaped, dark green to brownish-green leaf which is 80–400 mm (3–20 in) long and 3–4 mm (0.1–0.2 in) wide with a dark purplish-red base. The free part of the leaf is 100–160 mm (4–6 in) long. Between ten and twenty flowers are arranged along a thin flowering spike 80–120 mm (3–5 in) long. The flowers are chestnut-coloured to dark brown, 14–17 mm (0.6–0.7 in) long and 7–8 mm (0.28–0.31 in) wide. The dorsal sepal is broadly lance-shaped to egg-shaped, 8–9 mm (0.3–0.4 in) long and about 4 mm (0.2 in) wide and curves downwards. The lateral sepals are 8–9 mm (0.3–0.4 in) long, about 3 mm (0.1 in) wide, erect and curve away from each other. The petals are narrow egg-shaped to lance-shaped, 7–8 mm (0.28–0.31 in) long and about 1.5 mm (0.06 in) wide. The labellum is about 7 mm (0.3 in) long and 5 mm (0.2 in) wide, turns upwards at about 90° near its middle, and its edges are slightly wavy. Flowering occurs from late November to January.

== Taxonomy and naming ==
Prasophyllum castaneum was first formally described in 1998 by David Jones from a specimen collected on Bruny Island and the description was published in Australian Orchid Research. The specific epithet (castaneum) is a Latin word meaning "of the colour of chestnuts", referring to the colour of the flowers.

== Distribution and habitat ==
The chestnut leek orchid grows in moist heath under low shrubs in the South Bruny National Park and Tasman National Park.

== Conservation ==
Prasophyllum castaneum is only known from two populations containing a total of fifty plants. The species is classified as Endangered under the Tasmanian Threatened Species Protection Act 1995 and as Critically Endangered under the Commonwealth Government Environment Protection and Biodiversity Conservation Act 1999 (EPBC) Act. Although both population are in national parks, one would be devastated by bushfire and the other is threatened by invasion of scrubby species in the absence of fire.
