= Sterile Island =

Island in Tasmania, Australia

Coordinates: 43°33′S 146°59′E

Sterile Island is a 3.68 ha island game reserve in south-eastern Australia. It is part of the Actaeon Island Group, lying close to the south-eastern coast of Tasmania, at the southern entrance to the D'Entrecasteaux Channel between Bruny Island and the mainland.

== Fauna ==
Recorded breeding seabird and wader species are the little penguin, Pacific gull and sooty oystercatcher. European rabbits occur on the island. The metallic skink is present.
