= Southport Island =

Island in Tasmania, Australia

Coordinates: 43°28′S 147°00′E

Southport Island, with the adjacent Southport Reef, is a 7 ha island in south-eastern Australia. It is part of the Actaeon Island Group, lying close to the south-eastern coast of Tasmania, at the southern entrance to the D'Entrecasteaux Channel between Bruny Island and the mainland.

== Flora and fauna ==
The principal vegetation community is coastal heath, dominated by Acacia, Banksia, Leptospermum, Melaleuca and Westringia species. Blackberry is a problem weed. The island is being used as a translocation site for the endangered heath Epacris stuartii, which is threatened in its nearby natural habitat by cinnamon fungus.

Recorded breeding seabird species are the little penguin, short-tailed shearwater, silver gull and crested tern. The metallic skink is present.
