= Blanche Rock =

Island in Tasmania, Australia

Coordinates: 43°29′S 147°00′E

Blanche Rock is a 0.07 ha dolerite islet in south-eastern Australia. It is part of the Actaeon Island Group, lying close to the south-eastern coast of Tasmania, at the southern entrance to the D'Entrecasteaux Channel between Bruny Island and the mainland. It is part of the South Bruny National Park.

== Fauna ==
Recorded breeding seabird and wader species are the Pacific gull, sooty oystercatcher and black-faced cormorant.
