= Courts Island =

Island in Tasmania, Australia

Coordinates: 43.496°S 147.135°E

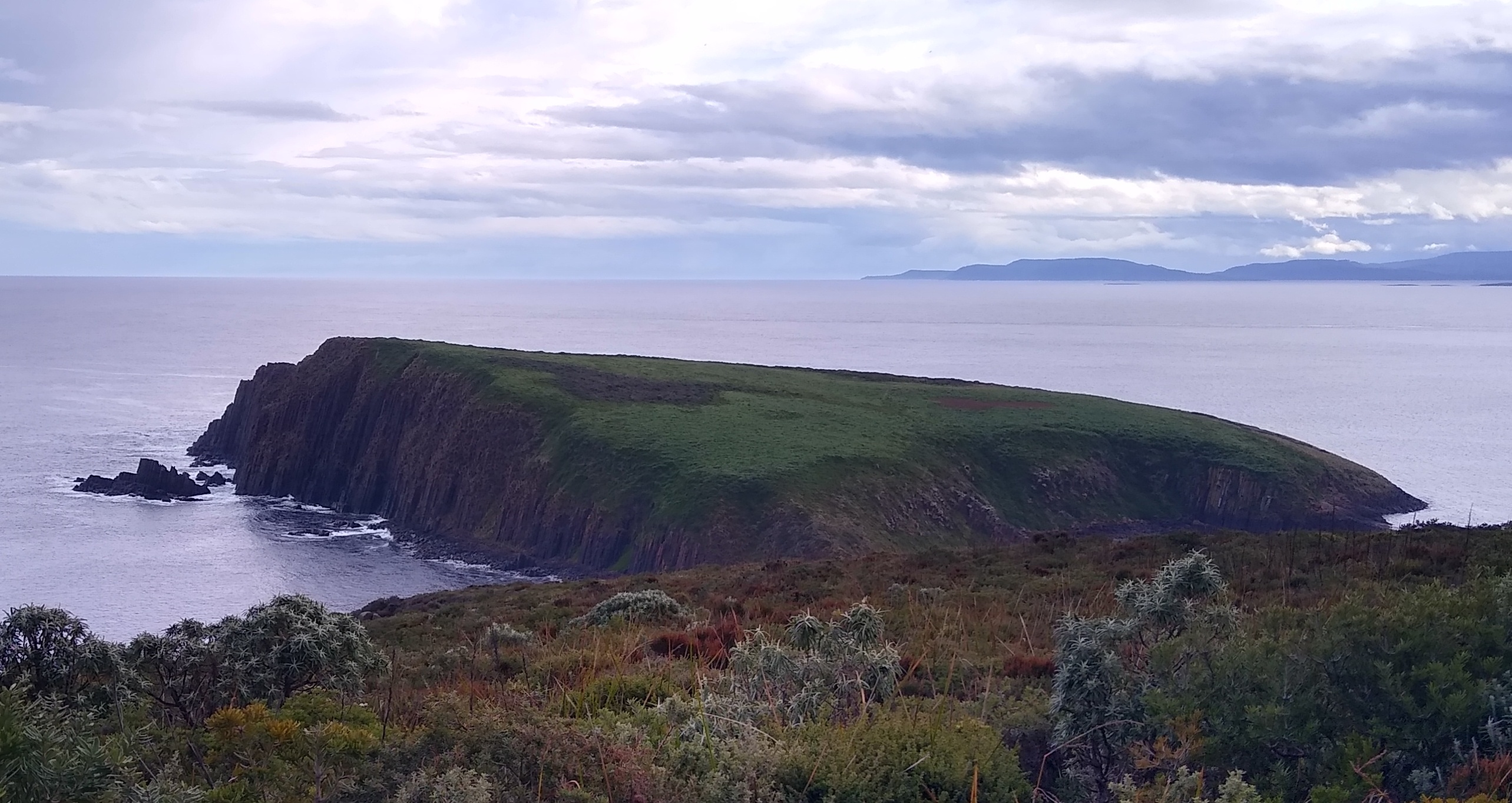
Courts Island

Courts Island is a dolerite island with an area of 15.83 ha in south-eastern Australia. It is part of the Actaeon Island Group, lying close to the south-eastern coast of Tasmania, at the southern entrance to the D'Entrecasteaux Channel between Bruny Island and the mainland. It is connected to Bruny Island by a spit at low tide, and is part of South Bruny National Park.

== Fauna ==
Recorded breeding seabird species are the little penguin, short-tailed shearwater and sooty shearwater. Feral cats are present.
