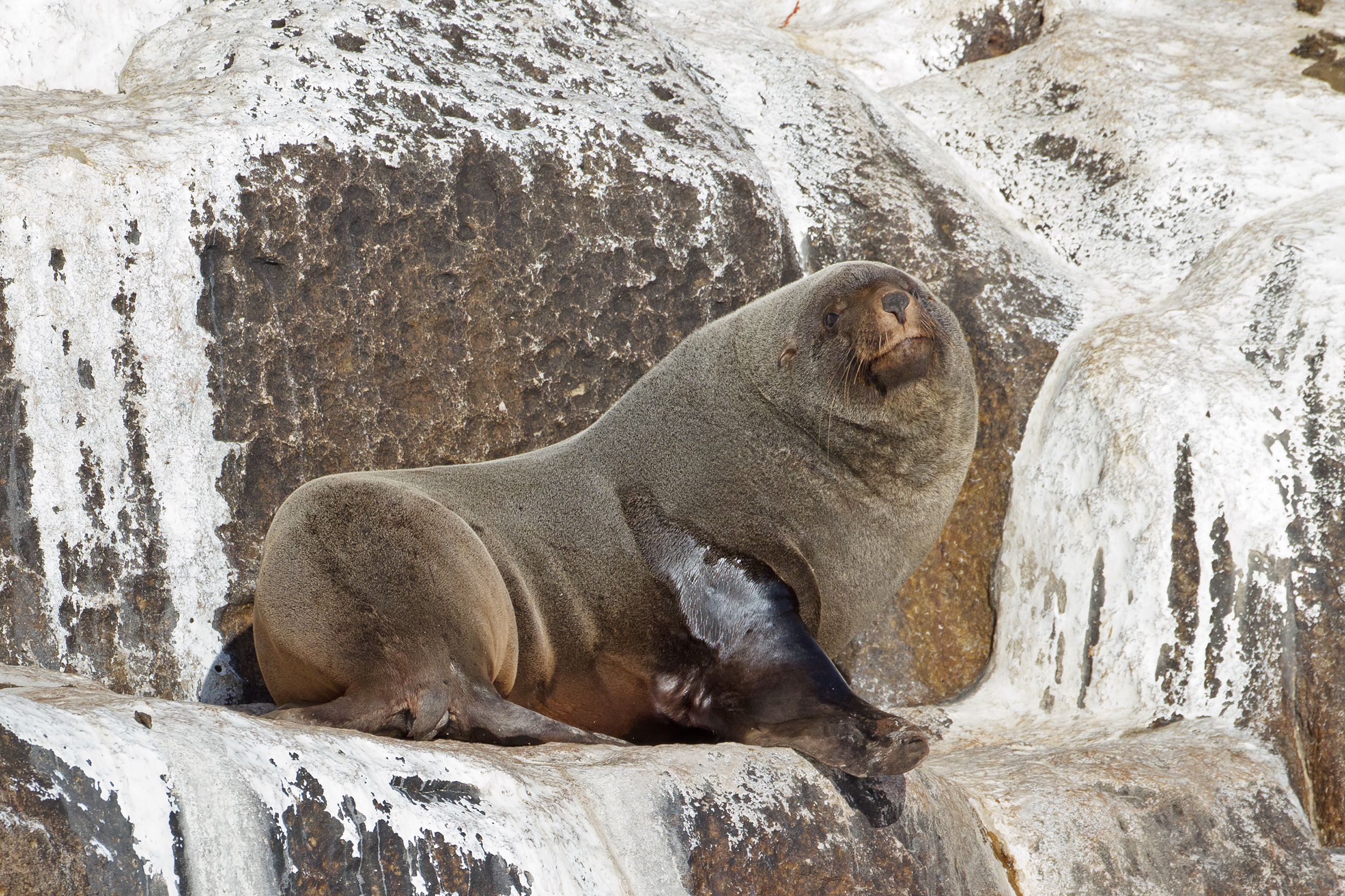
- Hauling-out on the Hippolyte Rocks off the east coast of Tasmania

Conservation status
- Least Concern (IUCN 3.1)
- CITES Appendix II

Scientific classification
- Kingdom: Animalia
- Phylum: Chordata
- Class: Mammalia
- Order: Carnivora
- Parvorder: Pinnipedia
- Family: Otariidae
- Genus: Arctocephalus
- Species: A. pusillus

Binomial name
- Arctocephalus pusillus (Schreber, 1775)

Subspecies
- A. p. pusillus (Cape/South African fur seal); A. p. doriferus (Australian fur seal)
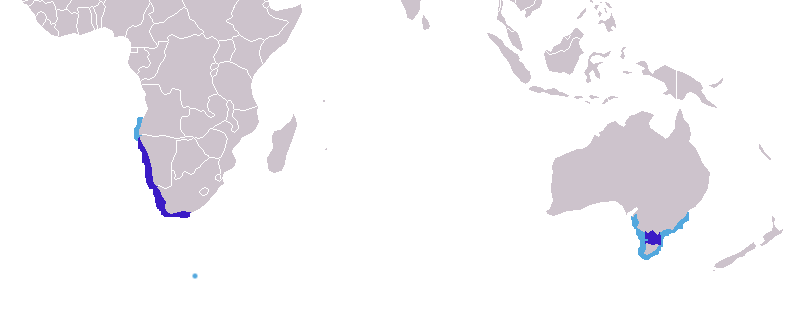
- Distribution breeding colonies non-br individuals

= Arctocephalus pusillus =

Species of seal

Arctocephalus pusillus, commonly known as the Afro-Australian fur seal, or brown fur seal is a species of fur seal. The species is often referred to as the Cape fur seal, although this name is also used specifically for the nominate subspecies, A. p. pusillus, of southern Africa. The other subspecies, A. p. doriferus, is found in Australia and is known as the Australian fur seal.

== Description ==
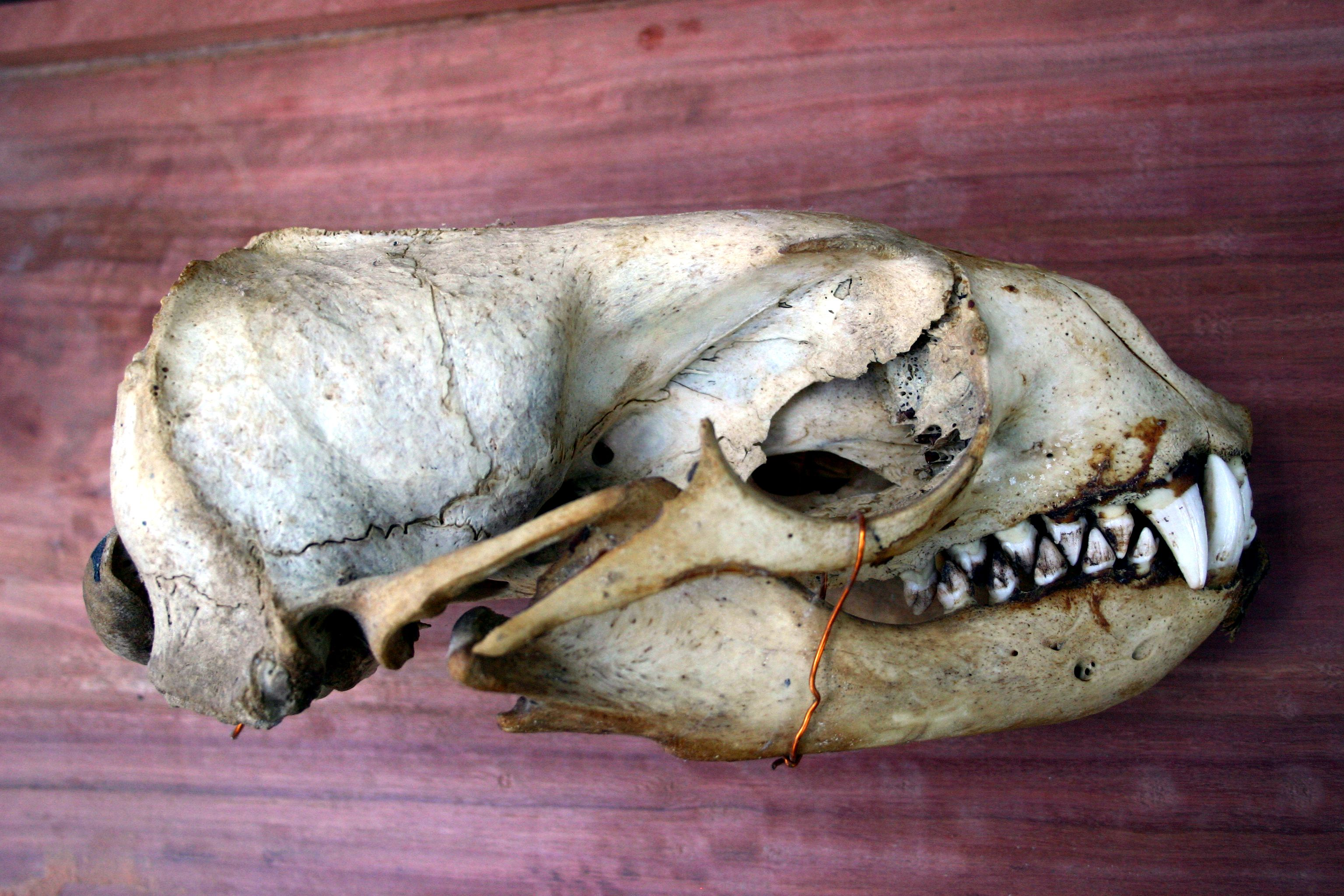
Skull of male

Arctocephalus pusillus is the largest and most robust member of the fur seals. It has a broad, flat head with a pointed snout that may be slightly upturned. It has external ear flaps (pinnae) and its whiskers (vibrissae) are long, possibly extending past the pinnae, especially in adult males. The fore-flippers are covered with sparse hairs over about three-quarters of their length. The hind flippers are short relative to the large body, with short, fleshy tips on the digits. The size and weight of the brown fur seal depend on the subspecies; the Southern African subspecies is, on average, slightly larger than the Australian subspecies. Males of the African subspecies (A. p. pusillus) are 2.3 m (7.5 ft) in length on average and weigh 200–300 kg (440–660 lb). Females are smaller, averaging 1.8 m (5.9 ft) in length and typically weighing 120 kg (260 lb). Males of the Australian subspecies (A. p. doriferus) are 2.0–2.2 m (6.6–7.2 ft) in length and weigh 190–280 kg (420–620 lb). Females are 1.2–1.8 m (3.9–5.9 ft) length and weigh 36–110 kilograms (79–243 lb).

Adult male Cape fur seals are dark gray to brown, with a darker mane of short, coarse hairs and a lighter belly, while adult females are light brown to gray, with a light throat and darker back and belly. The fore-flippers of the fur seal are dark brown to black. Pups are born black, molting to gray with a pale throat within 3–5 months. The skull of the African subspecies has a larger crest between the mastoid process and the jugular process of the exoccipital.

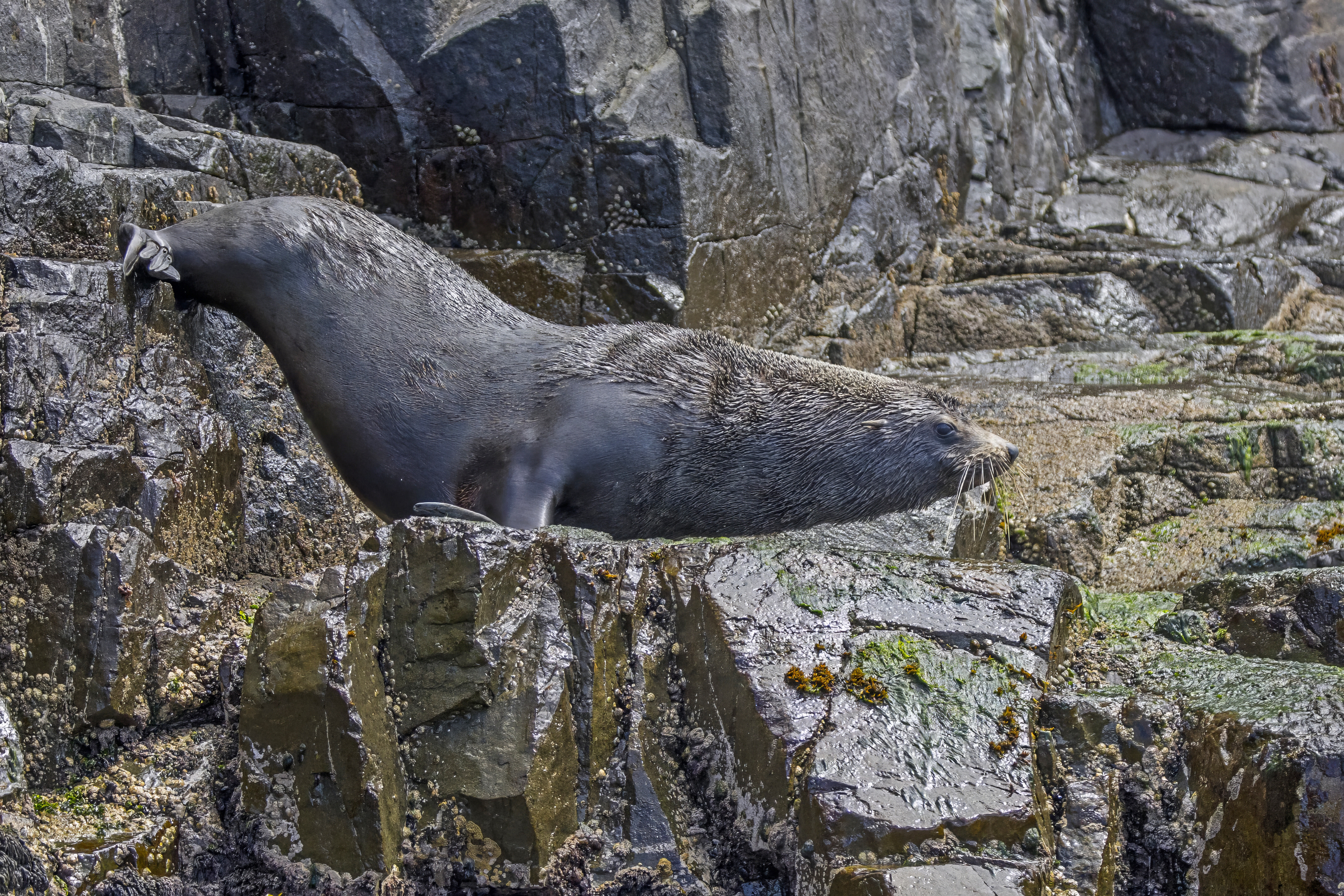
Male A. p. doriferus

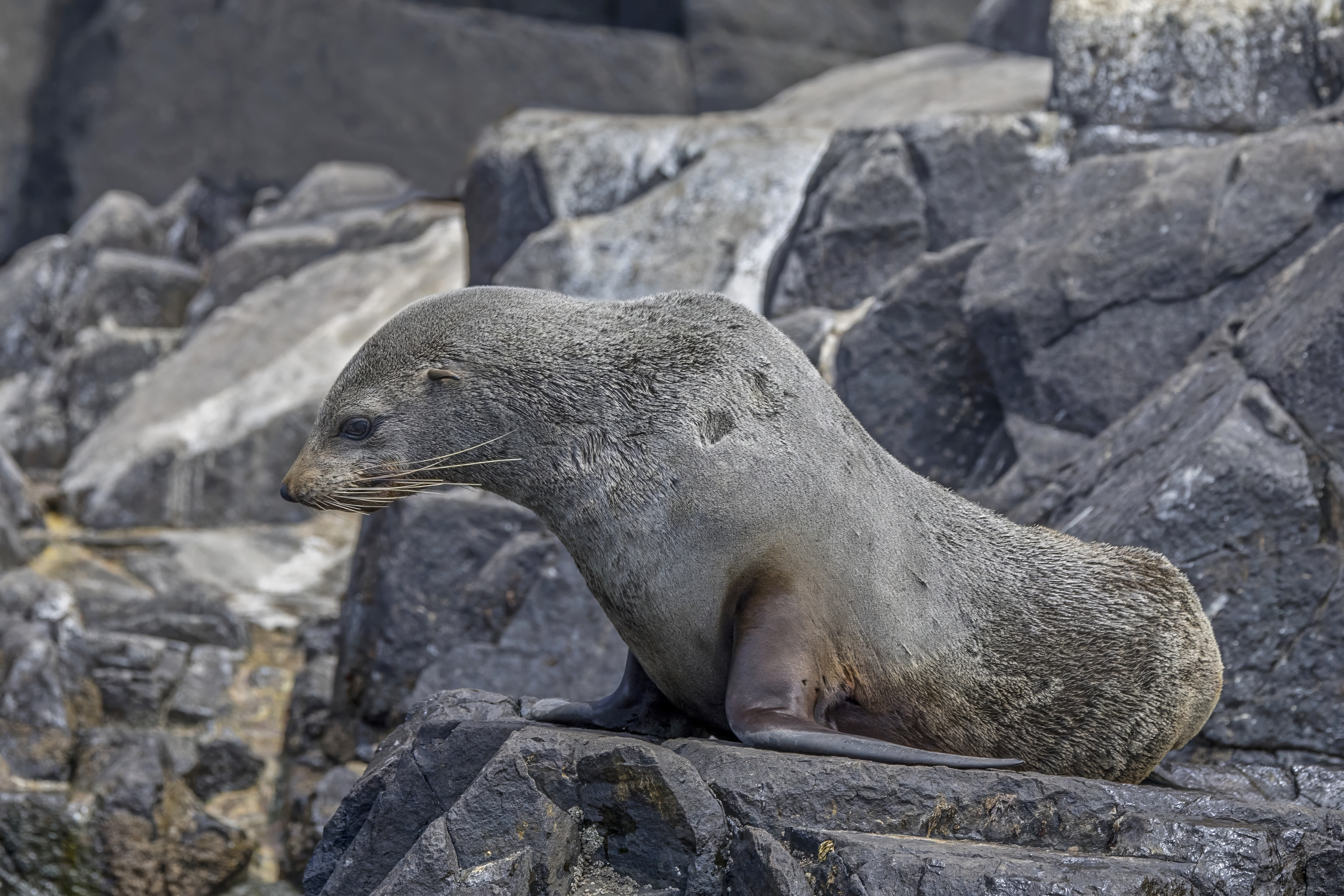
Female A. p. doriferus

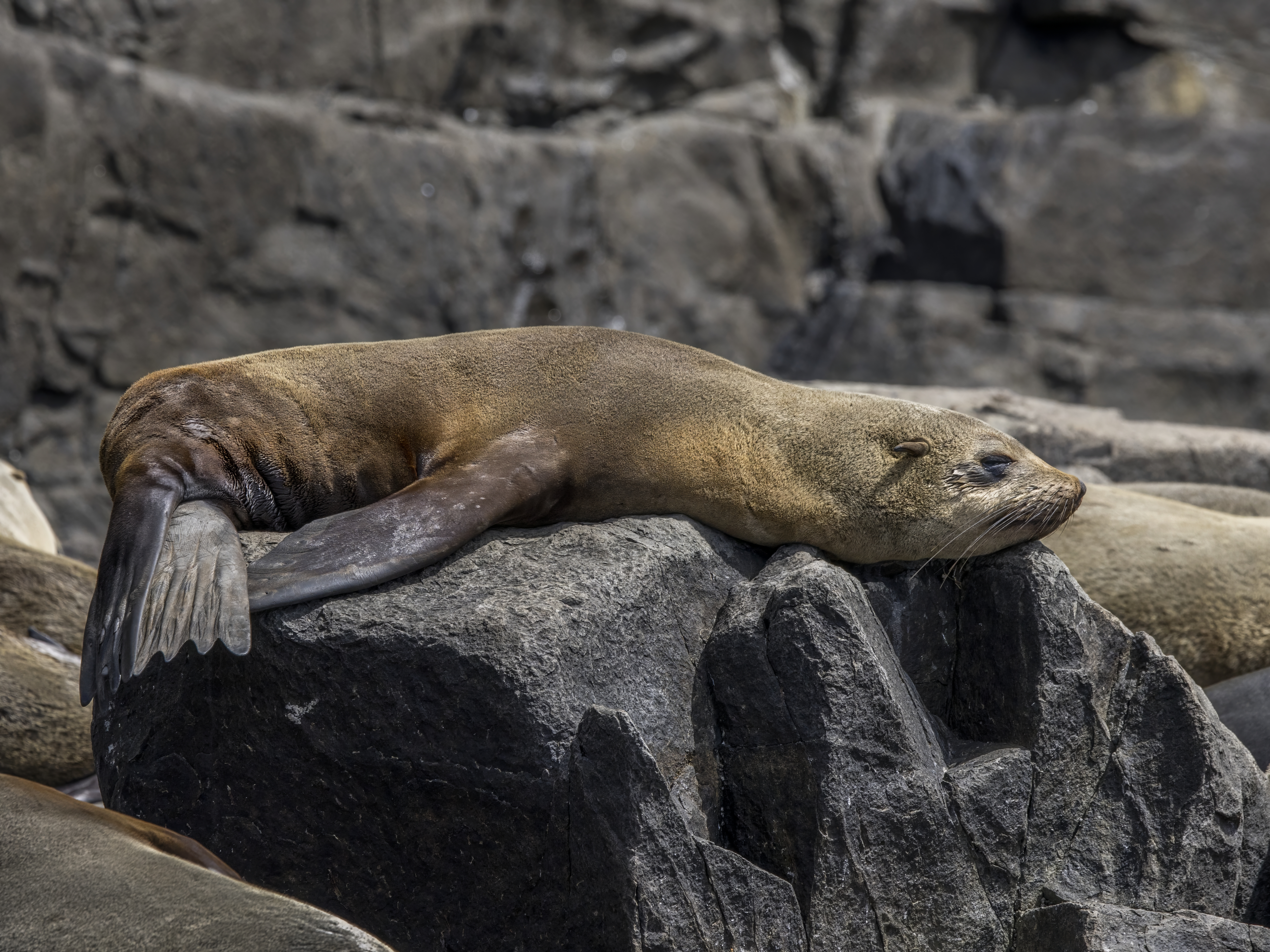
Juvenile A. p. doriferus

== Ecology ==
The African fur seal inhabits the southern and southwestern coast of Africa, from Cape Cross, Namibia to around the Cape of Good Hope and from Black Rocks, near Port Elizabeth in the Eastern Cape province. The Australian fur seal lives in the Bass Strait, on four islands off Victoria (southeastern Australia), and five islands off Tasmania. Brown fur seals prefer to haul-out and breed on rocky outcrops and small islands, rock ledges and exposed reefs, as well as on rocky, pebble or boulder beaches. However, some larger colonies can be found on sandy beaches, such as in South Africa. Fur seals spend most of the year at sea, but are never too far from land. They have been recorded 160 km from land, but this is not common.

The African fur seal's diet is made up of up to 70% fish, 20% squid, and 2% crab. Also eaten are other crustaceans, cephalopods, and sometimes seabirds. In rare instances, they have even been documented attacking and eating sharks. A recent incident occurred off Cape Point, South Africa, where a large male was observed attacking and killing five blue sharks between 1.0 and 1.4 m long. Observers concluded that the seal likely killed the sharks to eat the fish-rich contents of their stomachs, as well as their livers, for energy. The Australian fur seal mostly eats squid, octopus, fish, and lobsters. The brown fur seal dives for its food. The African subspecies can dive as deep as 204 m (669') for as long as 7.5 minutes. The Australian subspecies generally feeds at lower depths, diving an average of 120 m (394'), and going as deep as 200 m (656').

The brown fur seal's main predators are great white sharks, orcas, and occasionally vagrant southern elephant seals. African land-based predators, primarily of pups, include black-backed jackals, brown hyenas and occasionally lions on the Skeleton Coast in Namibia. In addition, seagulls and other seabirds are thought to peck the eyes out of baby seals, especially sick or injured individuals, to render them helpless and disabled, as they begin to feast on their flesh.

In False Bay, the seals employ several defensive strategies while in shark-infested waters, such as:

- Swimming in large groups and harassing sharks in the vicinity.
- Low porpoising, to increase subsurface vigilance.
- Darting in different directions to confuse when attacked.
- Using their agility to stay out of reach.
- Swimming near the dorsal fin to stay clear of the shark's jaws, when pursued.
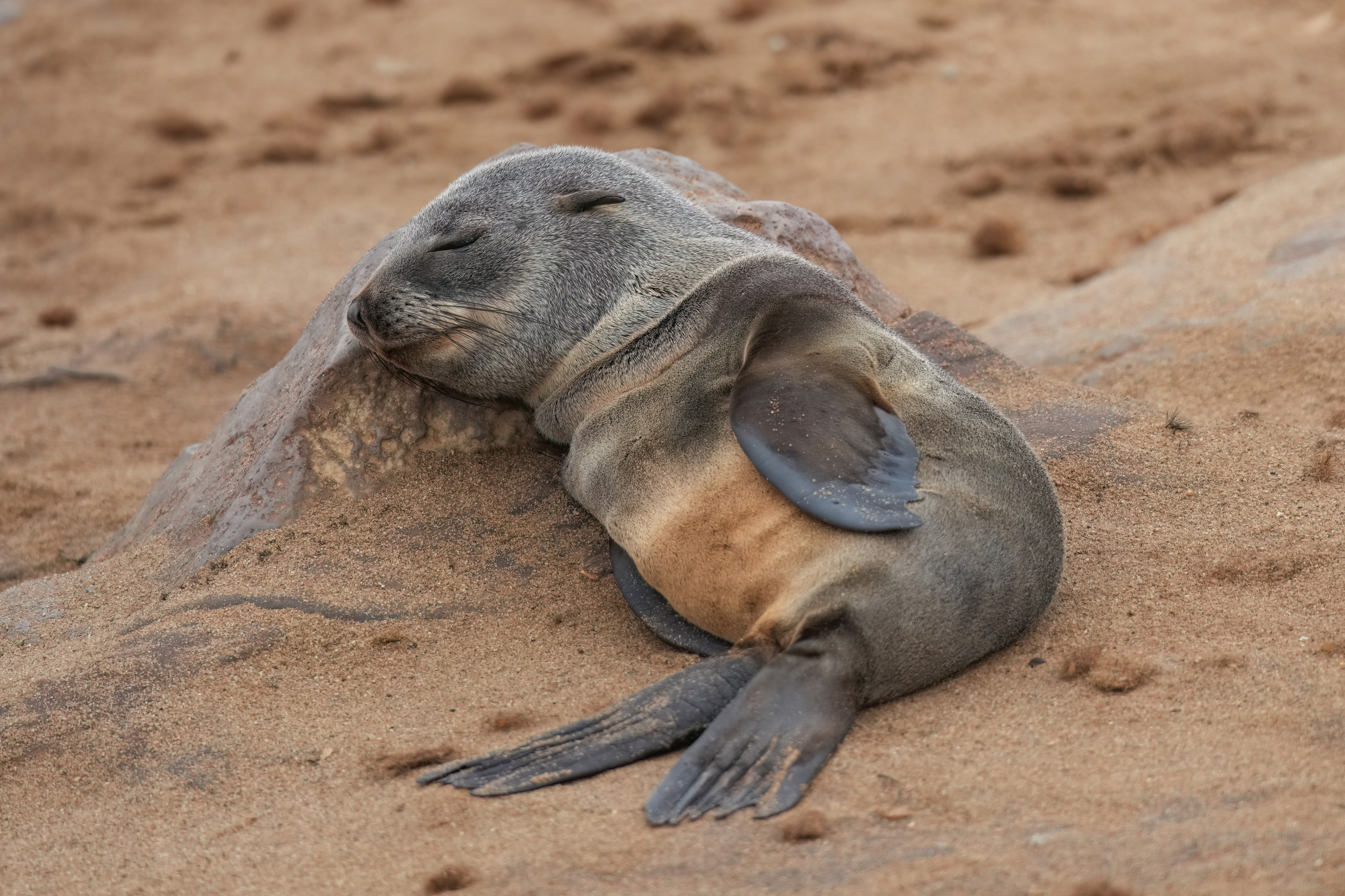
Baby seal sleeping

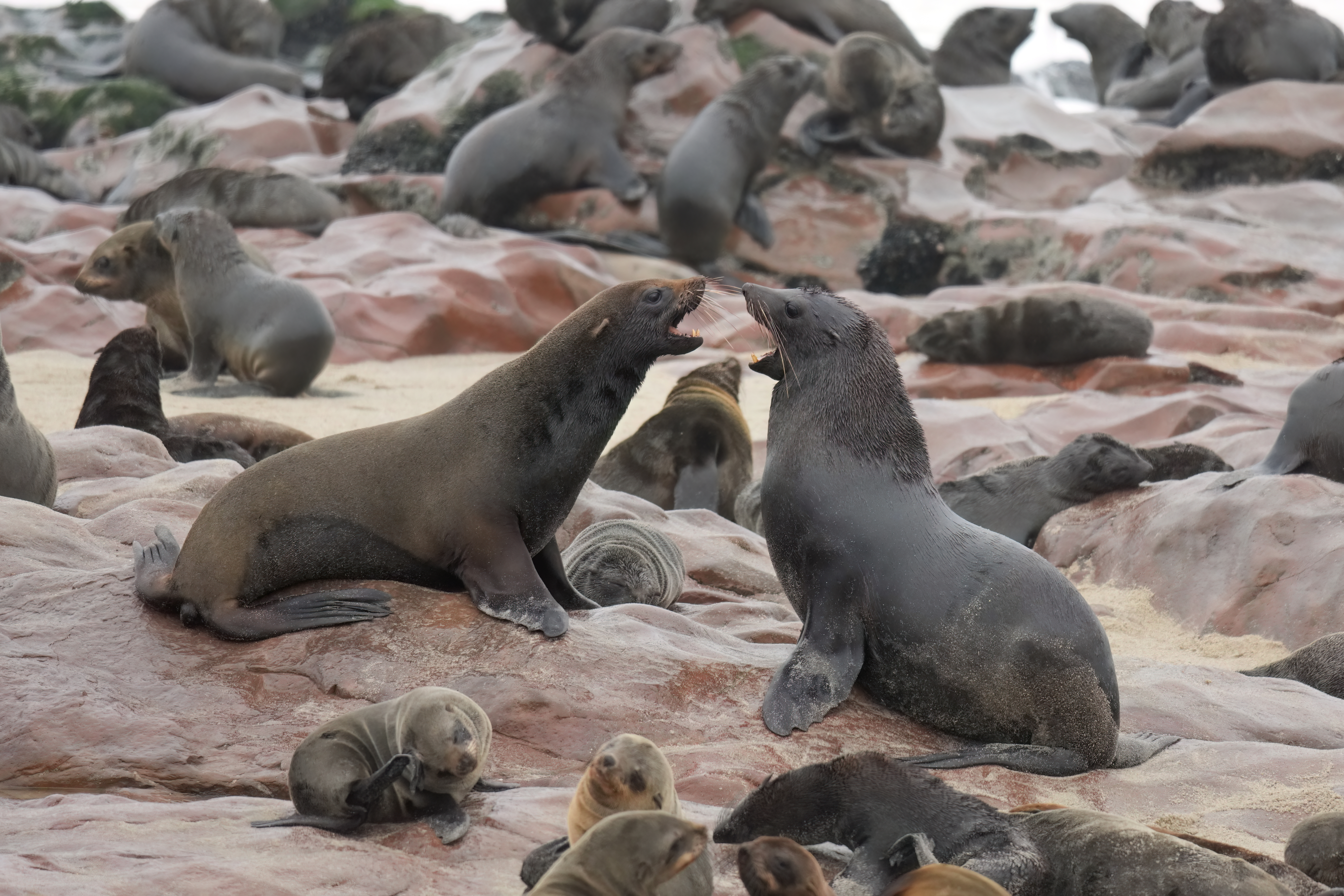
Cape fur seal bulls fighting at Cape Cross, Namibia

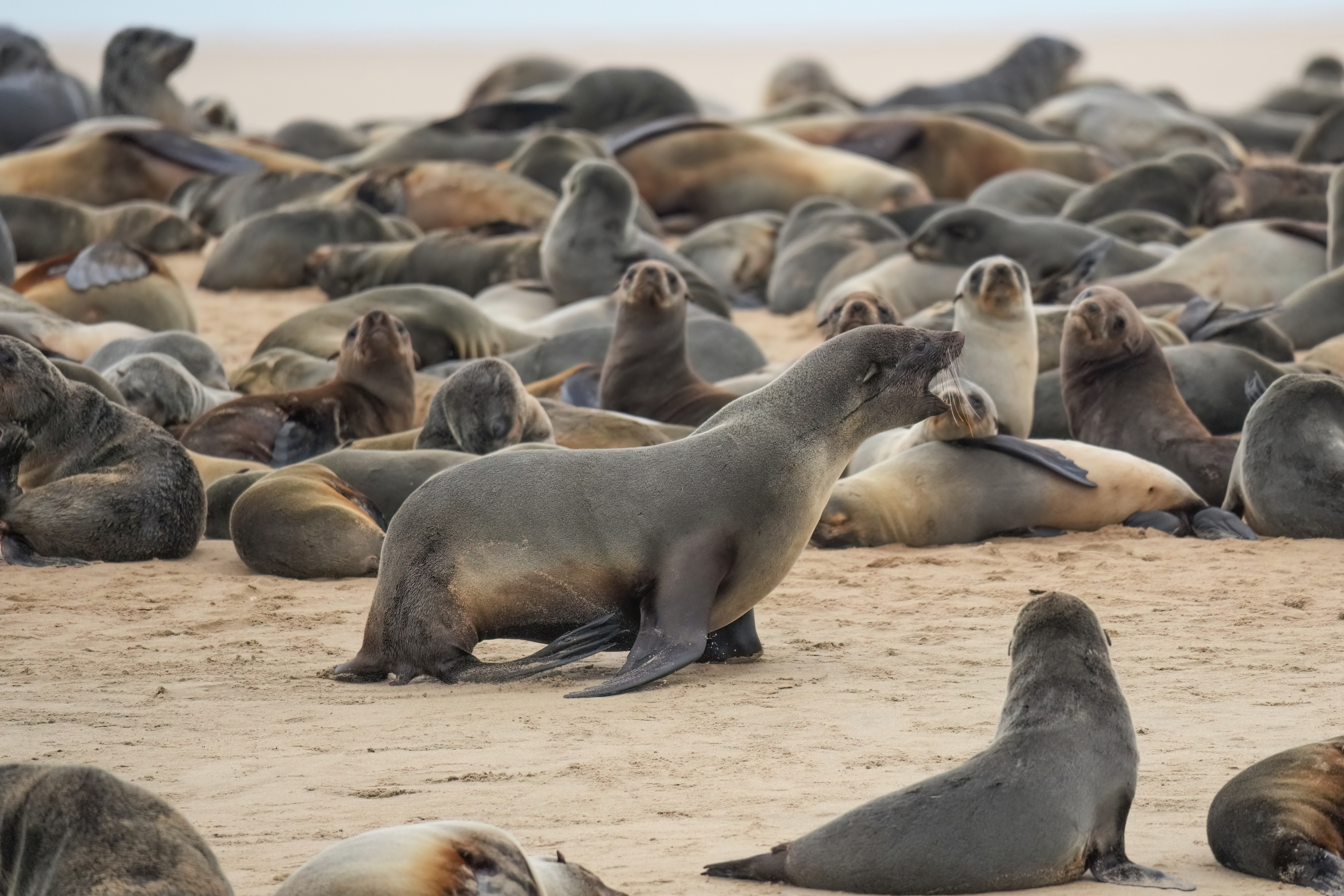
Cape fur seal bull vocalizing at Pelican point, Namibia

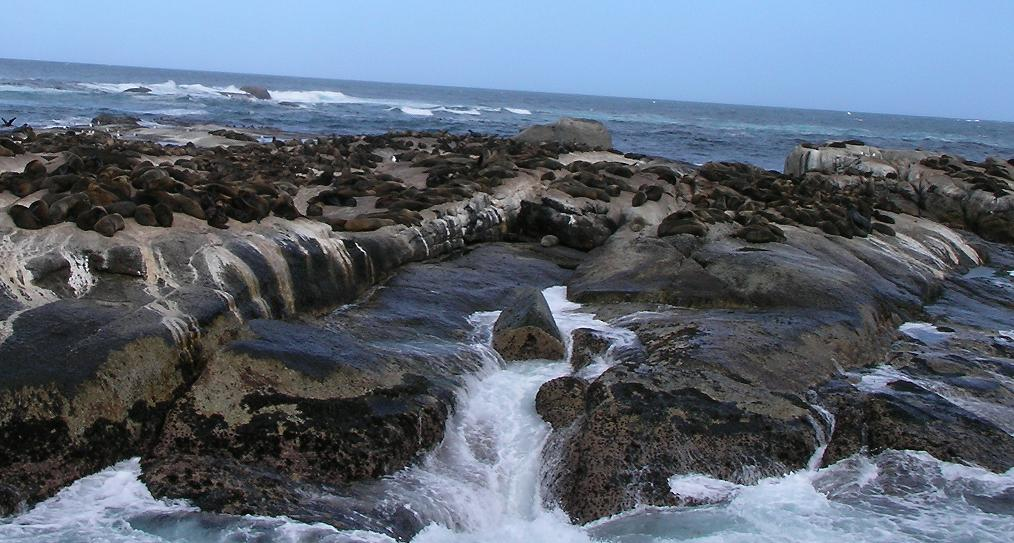
A fur seal colony at Duiker Island, South Africa

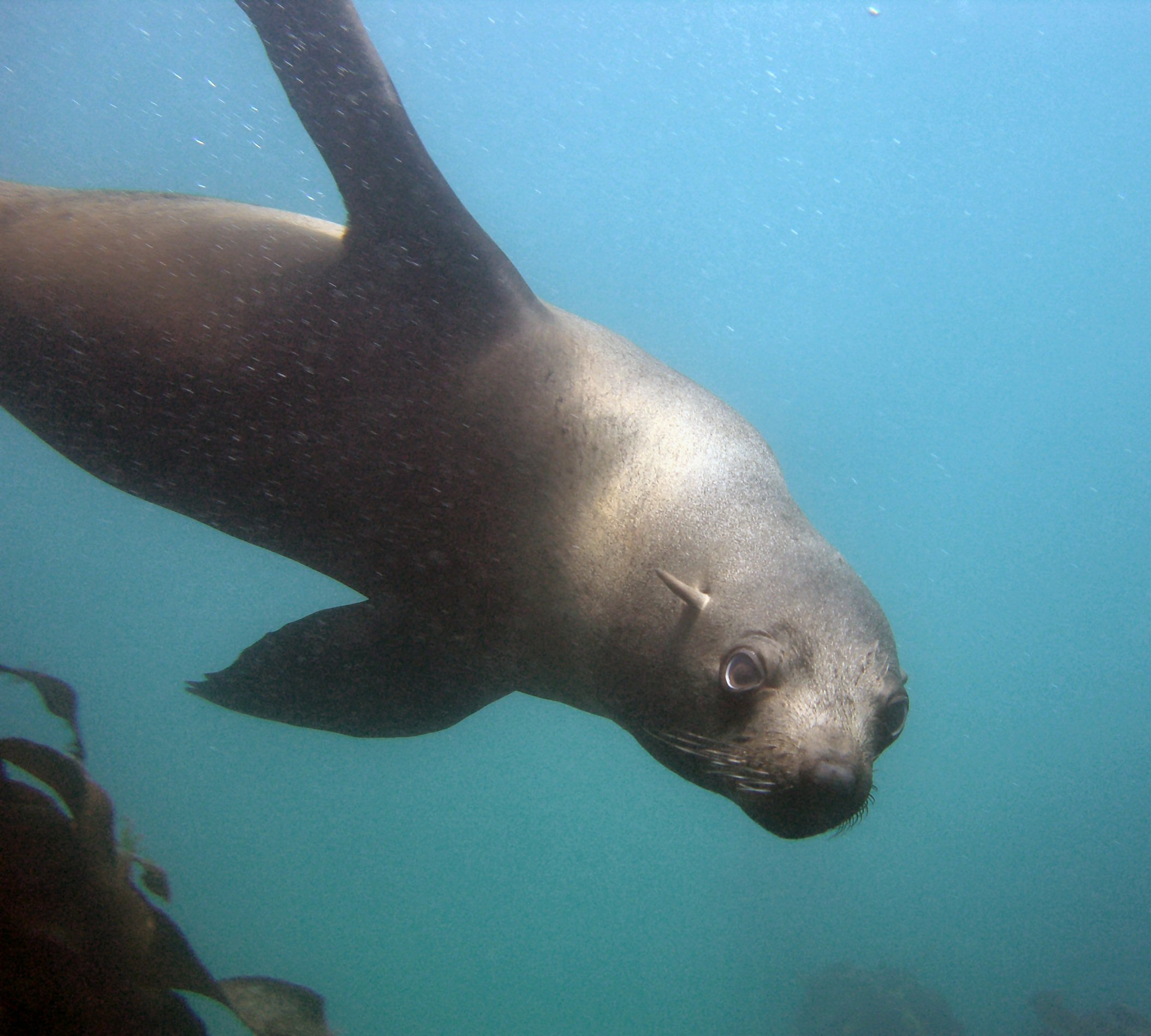
Fur seal underwater at Agulhas Bank

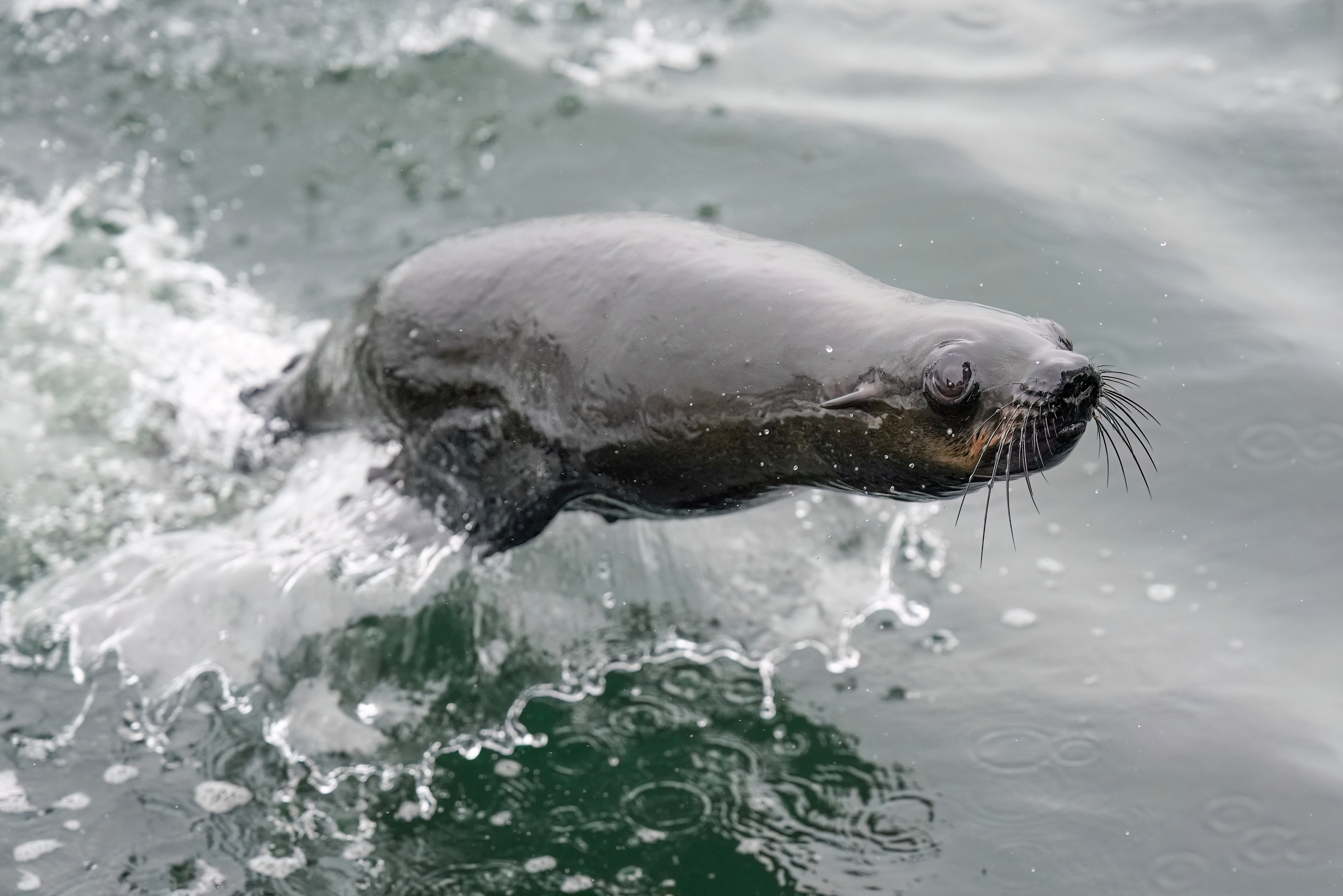
Cape fur seal jumping out of the water in Namibia

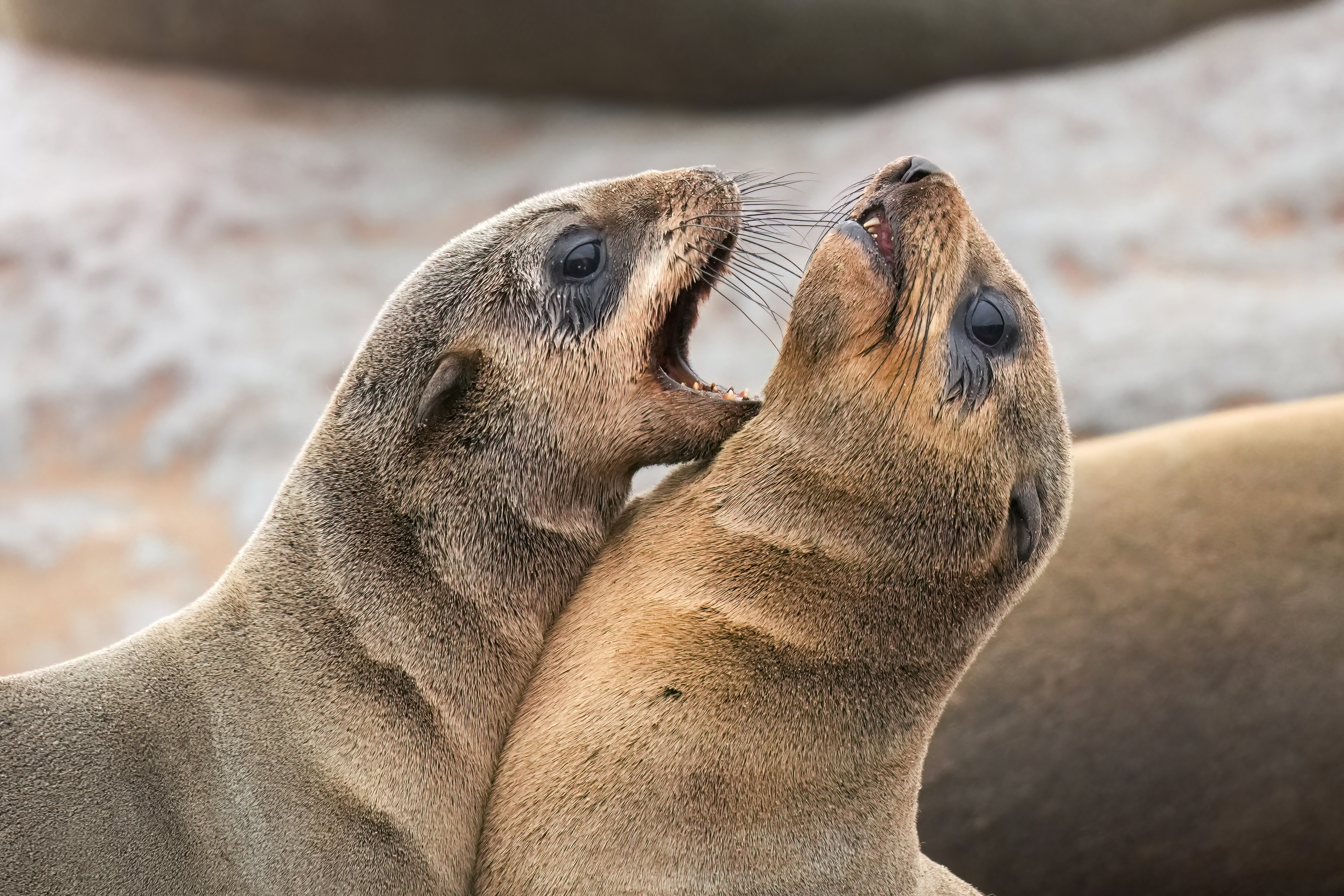
Juvenile Cape fur seals fighting at Cape Cross, Namibia

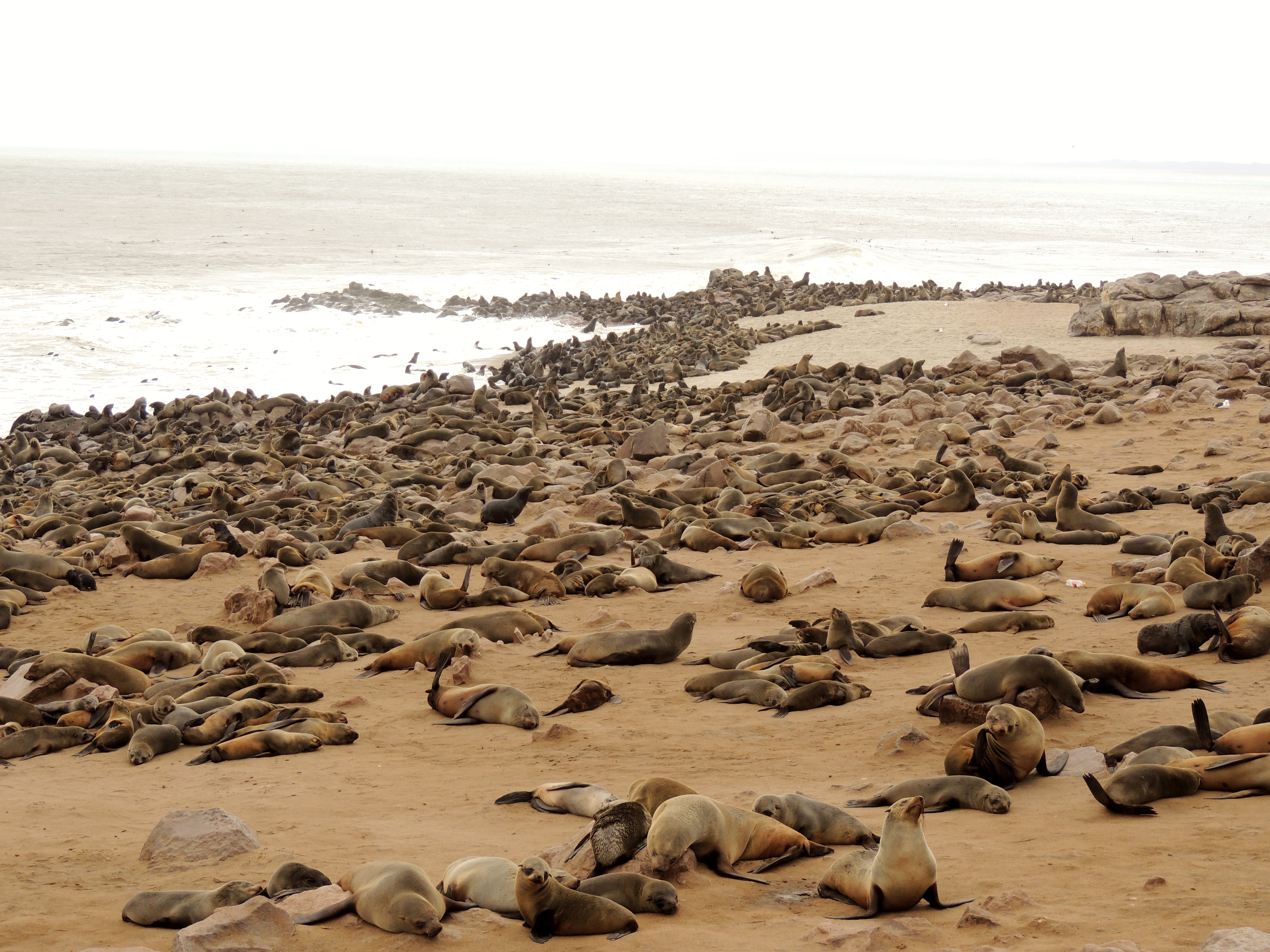
Cape Cross colony, Namibia

== Behaviour ==
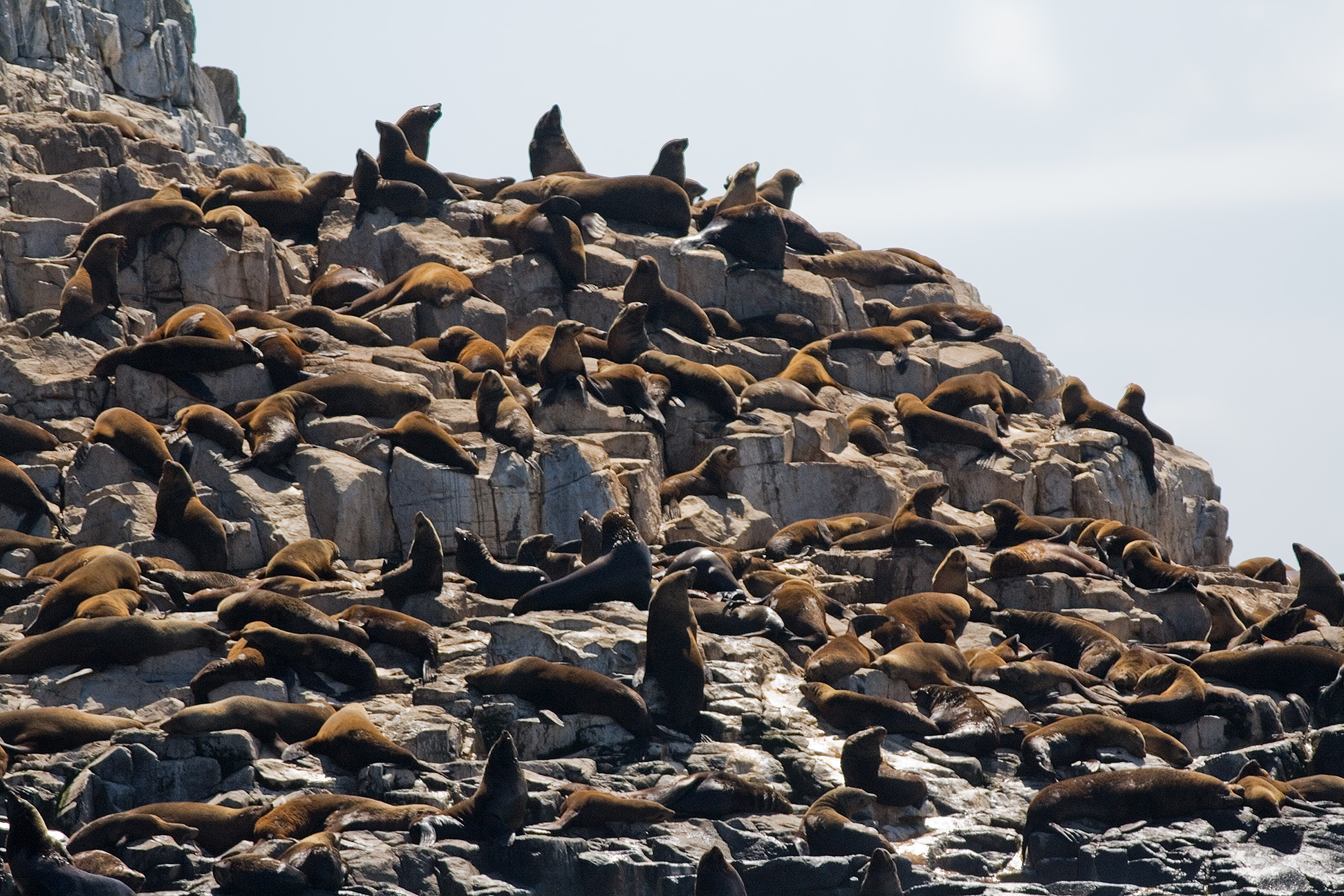
Brown fur seal colony at Friar Islands, Tasmania

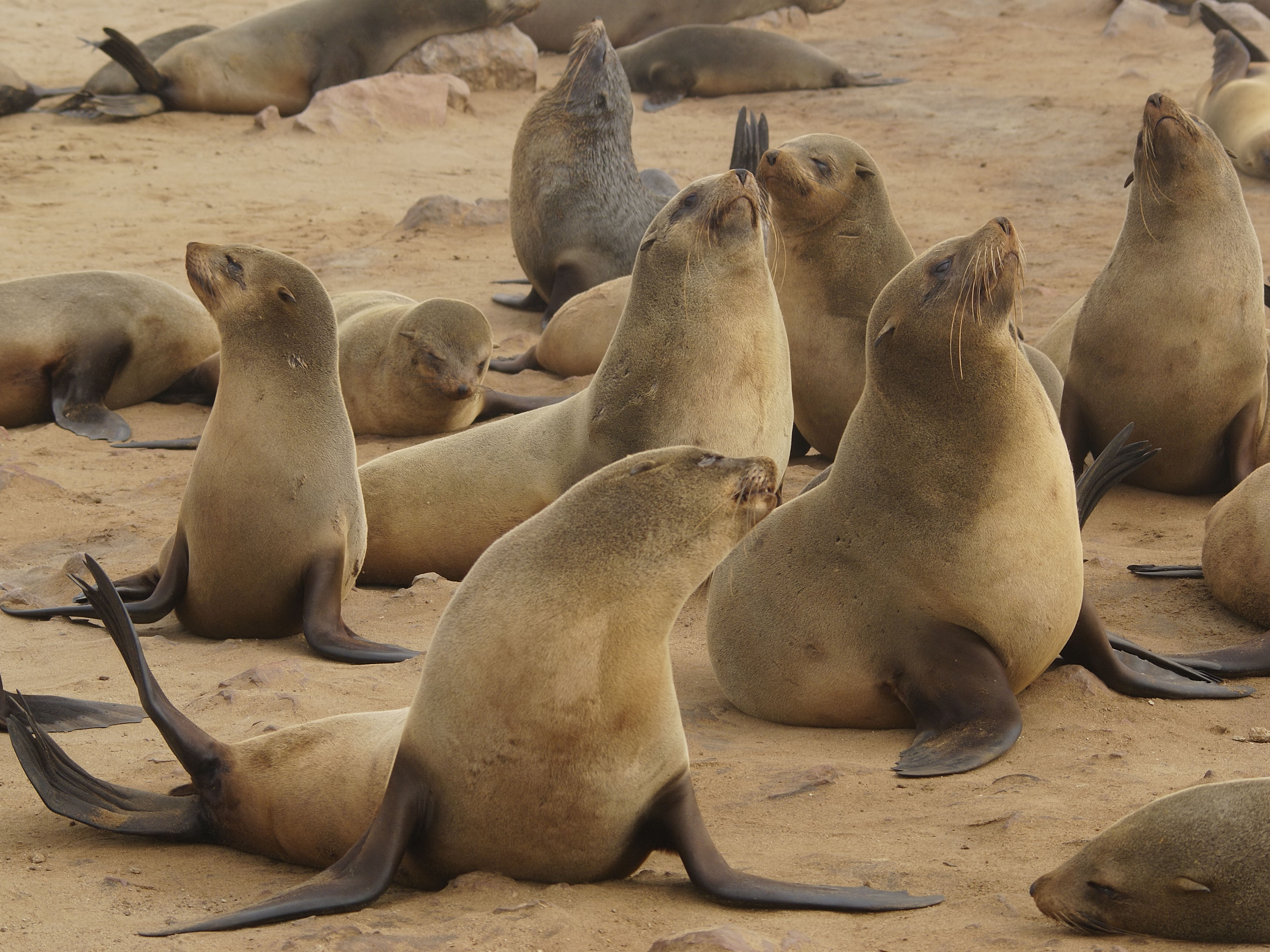
Brown fur seals in Cape Cross

=== Acoustic behavior ===
Australian fur seals are social animals that use vocalizations in a broad range of contexts. These vocalizations have been shown to possess unique properties that enable individual recognition. This is particularly important for the reunion of mothers and pups that experience repeated separations whilst mothers are out at sea foraging, sometimes for days at a time. Upon their return, mothers need to locate their pups. This reunion process may also be facilitated through a combination of smell and spatial cues.

In males, increases in testosterone and calling rates are seen in conjunction with the onset of the breeding season. Males can also differentiate neighboring males from stranger males, responding more aggressively to the vocalizations of strangers. This difference in response is suspected because the threat posed by a stranger is unknown and potentially greater than their neighbor, which they would have previously encountered while establishing their territories.

=== Breeding behaviour ===
Brown fur seals often gather into colonies on rookeries in numbers ranging from 500 to 1500, at least for the Australian subspecies. While fur seals spend most of the year at sea, they never fully evacuate the rookeries, as mothers and pups return to them throughout the year. No dispersal from a colony is established, although some fur seals from one colony have been found at another. True boundaries do not exist between the colonies. When at sea, they travel in small feeding groups. Brown fur seals begin to breed in the middle of October, when males haul out on shore to establish territories through display, vocalizations, sparring, and sometimes actual combat. They fast at this time and do not eat until after mating in November or December. When the females arrive, they fight among themselves for territories in which to give birth. Female territories are smaller than those of males and are always located within them. Females within a male's territory can be considered part of his harem. However, males do not herd the females, who are free to choose their mates and judge them based on the value of their territories. For the Australian fur seals, 82% of copulations are performed by males whose territories are located directly at the water's edge. Copulation between the male and his females begins 6 days after they give birth to their pups, conceived from the previous year. However, a delay occurs in the implantation of the blastocyst, which lasts 4 months in the African subspecies and 3 months in the Australian subspecies. Gestation for the brown fur seal typically lasts a year, or a few days less.

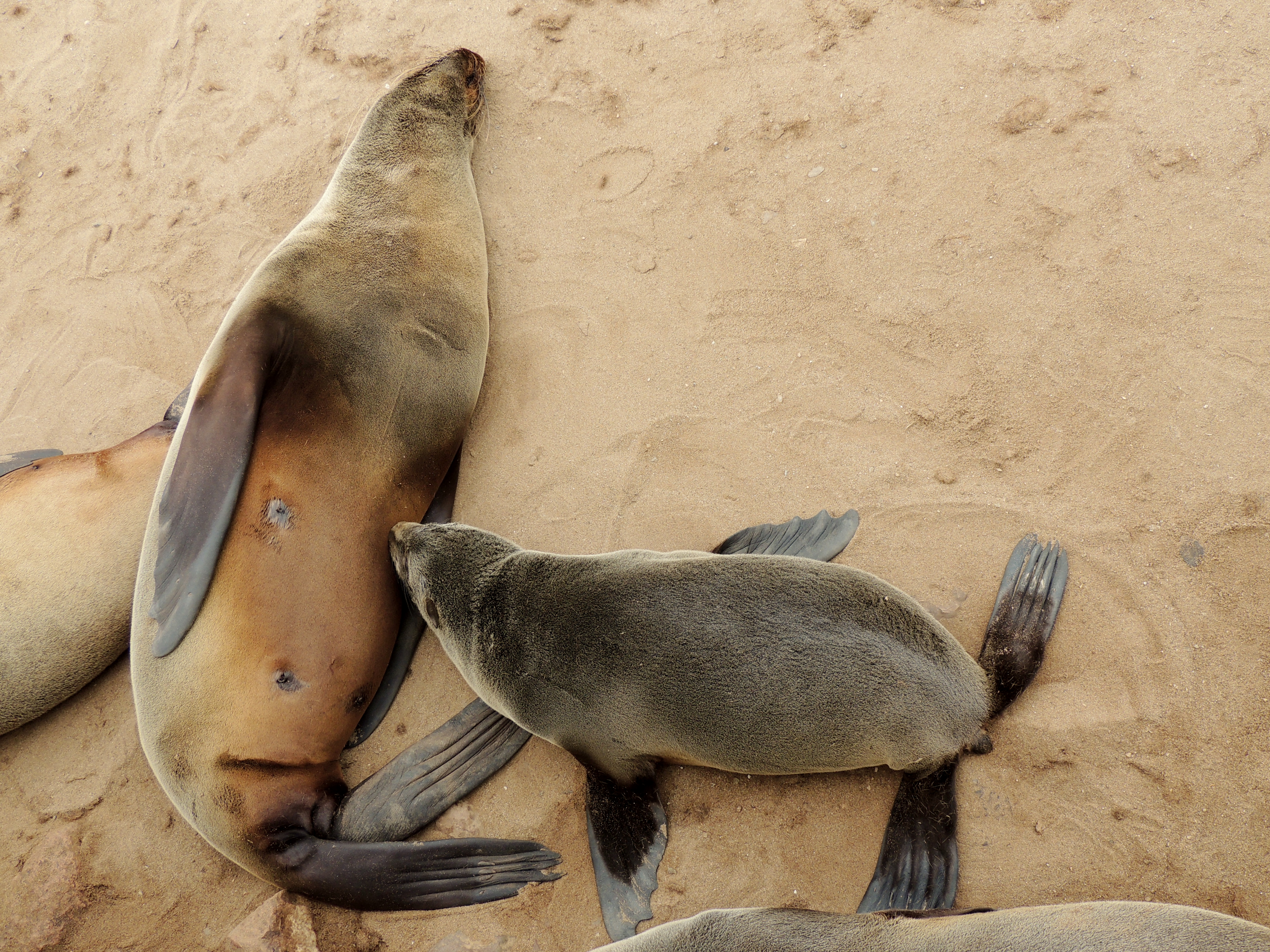
Suckling

After mating, females begin alternating brief periods of foraging at sea with several days ashore nursing their pups. Foraging trips last about 7 days in winter and about 4 days in summer and autumn. When a mother returns from sea to feed her pup, she emits a loud call that attracts all the nearby pups, but she responds only to her own pup. She may be able to recognize her pup by smell. When left alone, pups gather in groups and play during the evening. Pups are usually weaned at 4–6 months old.

=== African penguin decline ===
Sustained conservation efforts to increase the number of Cape fur seals (A. p. pusillus) is thought to be a contributing factor to the decline of African penguin populations. In Namibia, breeding colonies have been decimated by the predation of "rogue" Cape fur seals on African penguins. Penguins on Dyer Island in South Africa face the same threat. Conservationists consider culling of seals near breeding colonies as an effective recourse. Observational results from Mercury Island indicate that seal culling led to an increase in the population of penguins.

== Human interactions ==
This species is an inquisitive and friendly animal when in the water, and often accompanies scuba divers. They swim around divers for periods of several minutes at a time, even at a depth of 60 m. On land, they are far less relaxed and tend to panic when humans come near them.

Australian fur seals were hunted intensively between 1798 and 1825 for commercial reasons. Seal hunting stopped in Australia in 1923, and their population is still recovering, causing increasing friction with South Australian fishermen as their range expands. Breeding and haul-out sites are protected by law. South African fur seals have a robust, healthy population. Seal hunting was outlawed in South Africa in 1990.

Brown fur seals are still harvested in Namibia. Permits are issued for the killing of pups for their luxurious fur and adult males for their genitalia, which are considered an aphrodisiac in some countries. It is also considered necessary to limit seal numbers in Namibia because of the supposed effect seals have on the country's fish harvest. Research by environmental groups disputes this.

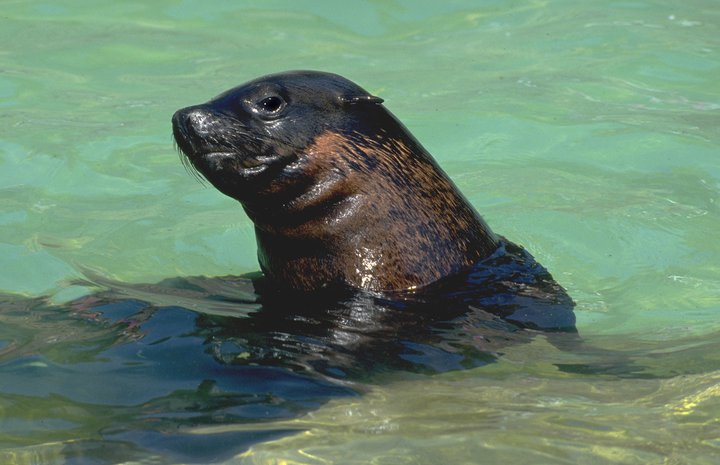
Brown fur seal Gaston in Prague Zoo

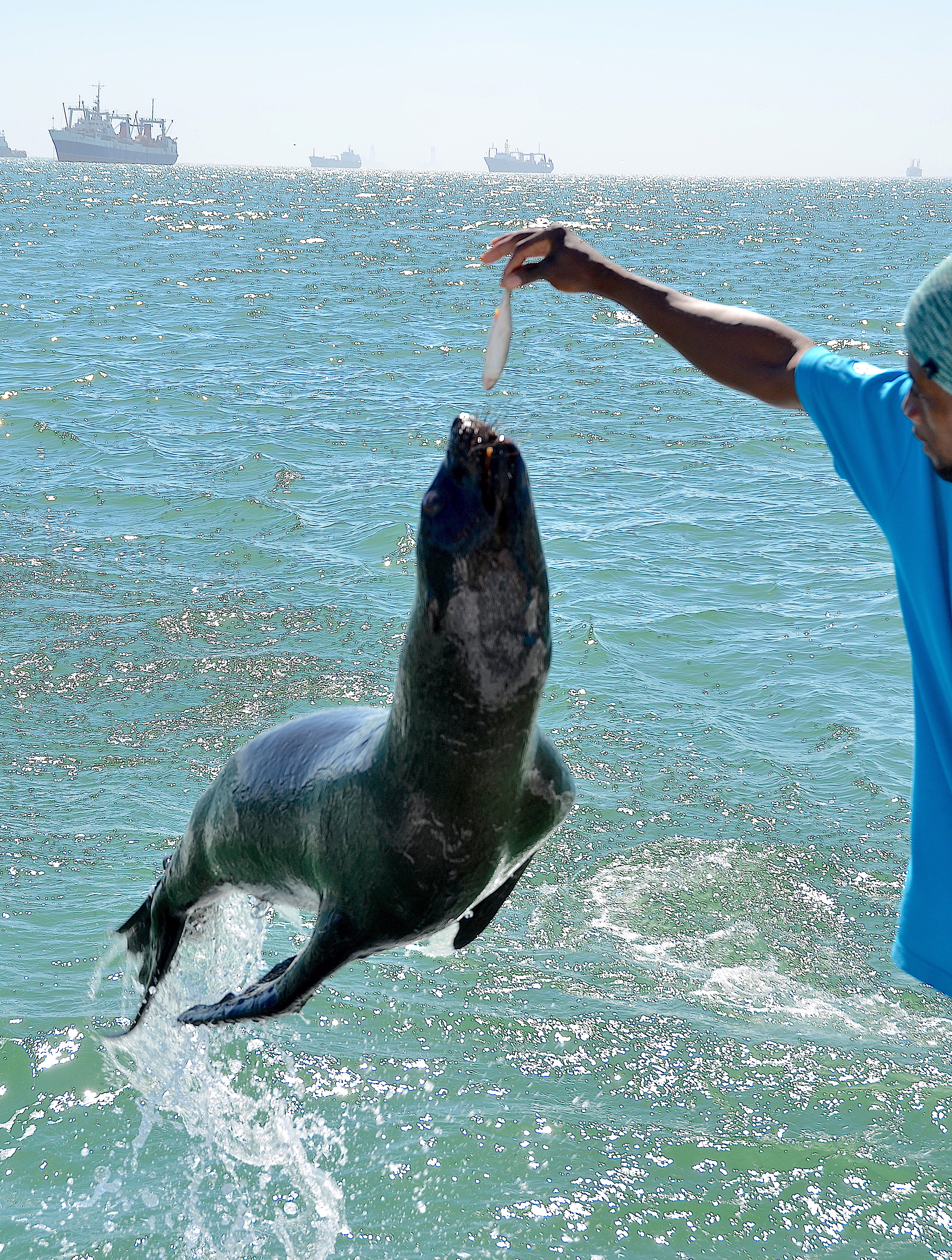
Fur seals used for tourist attraction in Namibia

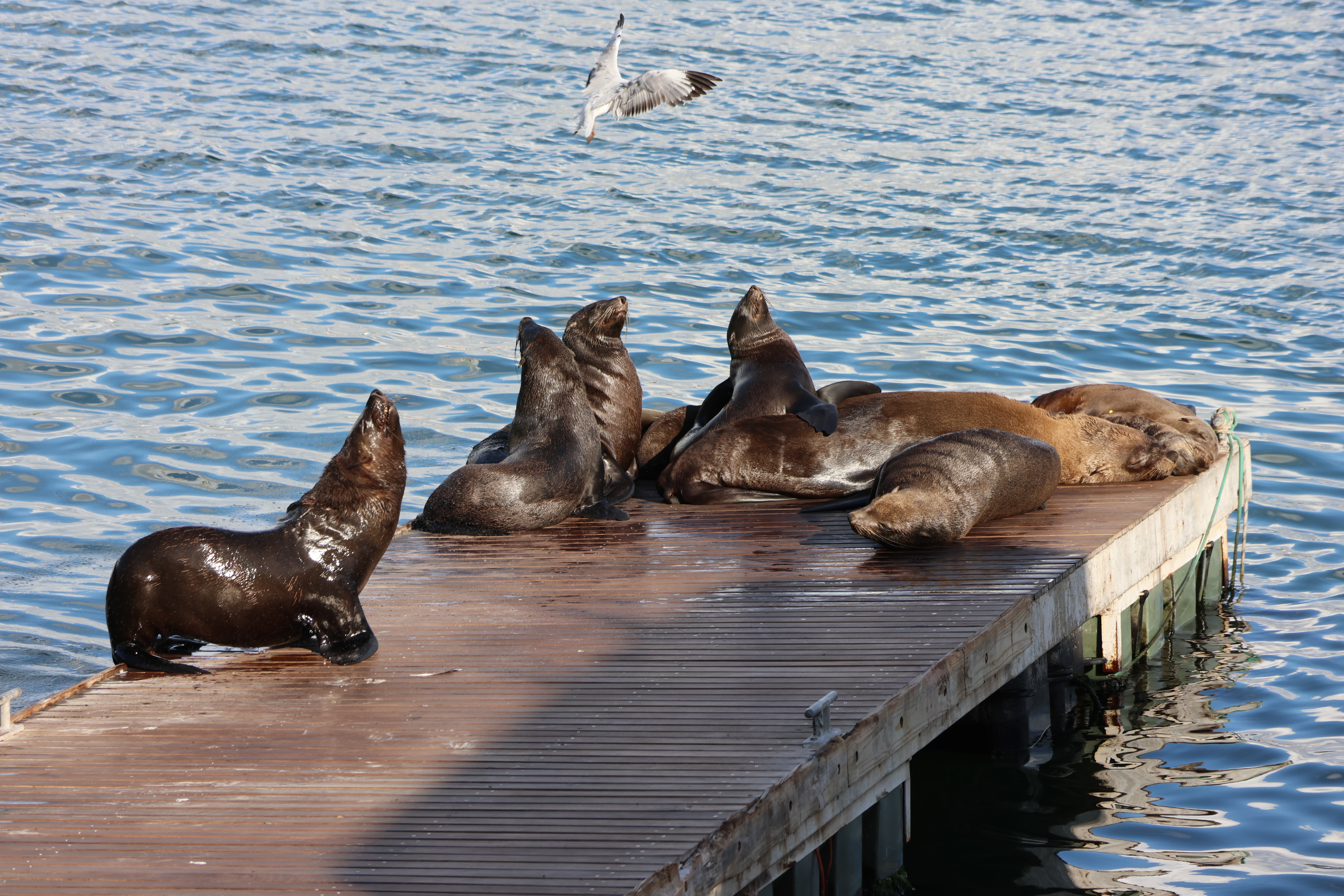
Cape fur seals in Cape Town Harbour, South Africa

=== Unexplained aggression ===
In January 2023, media reports indicated that seals have been attacking humans in South Africa, particularly in the Cape Town area. Scientists believed it was due to a brain-altering poison in the fish they consumed. The poison affects their behaviour making them more aggressive towards humans. Some attribute the aggressive behaviour to the surge of toxic red tide algae, fuelled by pollution and climate change. The incidents have increased recently, prompting concern and calls for further investigation.

==== Marine rabies outbreak ====
In July 2024, it was confirmed that 17 seals along a 650-km stretch of coastline between Cape Town and Plettenberg Bay tested positive for rabies, and that could be the cause of the attacking behaviour in fur seals. The hypothesis is the rabies was acquired from black-backed jackals who prey on the seals; rabies is endemic among southern African jackals.

By 2026, Cape fur seals had bitten 176 people along the south-western coast of South Africa. Scientists warn that the marine rabies outbreak is now endemic in this population and it could travel further south to breeding colonies in Antarctica and Marion Island.

== Threat by marine debris and industry ==
A 2021 study published in The Marine Pollution Bulletin found that the brown fur seal colonies in Namibia are vulnerable to extensive entanglement in marine debris as a result of extensive pollution in the oceans. The study overall found that juveniles are more prone to becoming entangled in marine debris, and that 53% of all entanglements discovered were caused by fishing line. Another study by the University of Stirling conducted a similar study on marine pollution and found an almost identical percentage, 52%, of entanglements of brown fur seals were caused by fishing debris.

Ocean Conservation Namibia, a local animal conservation group based in Walvis Bay, was formed by volunteers who capture entangled seals and free them from discarded entanglement discarded by ships and the fishing industry. The organization monitors the coast regularly, but their founder, Naude Dreyer, told reporters of drastically declining numbers of seals as pollution continues to increase.
