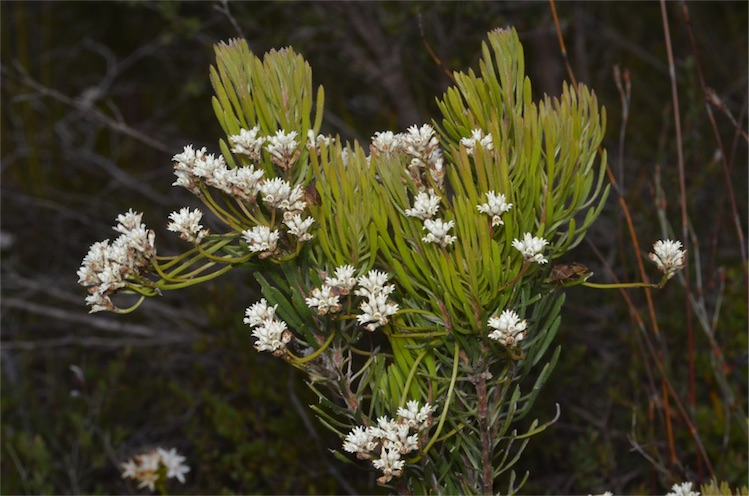
- In Freycinet National Park

Conservation status
- Vulnerable (EPBC Act)

Scientific classification
- Kingdom: Plantae
- Clade: Tracheophytes
- Clade: Angiosperms
- Clade: Eudicots
- Order: Proteales
- Family: Proteaceae
- Genus: Conospermum
- Species: C. hookeri

Binomial name
- Conospermum hookeri (Meisn.) E.M.Benn.

= Conospermum hookeri =

Species of shrub native to Australia

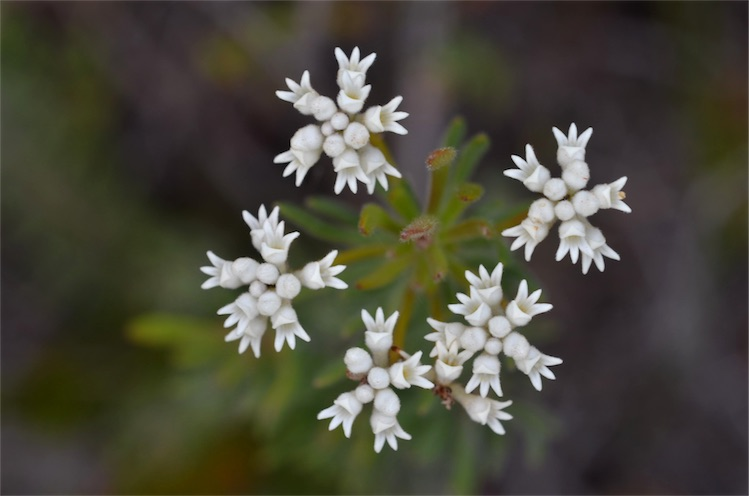
Flower detail

Conospermum hookeri, commonly known as Tasmanian smokebush, is a species of flowering plant in the family Proteaceae and is endemic to Tasmania. It is a shrub with many branches, spatula-shaped or linear leaves, panicles of spikes of white, tube-shaped flowers and reddish brown nuts covered with silky fawn-coloured hairs.

== Description ==
Conospermum hookeri is an erect, slender, much-branched shrub that typically grows to a height of 1.0–1.5 m (3 ft 3 in – 4 ft 11 in). Its leaves are crowded, greyish-green, spatula-shaped to linear, 19–32 mm (0.75–1.26 in) long, 1–35 mm (0.039–1.378 in) wide and point upwards. The flowers are borne in panicles that end in a spike with up to 20 flowers on a peduncle 20–25 mm (0.79–0.98 in) long and covered with silky white hairs. There are hairy bracteoles 3.5–4.0 mm (0.14–0.16 in) long and 2.5–3.0 mm (0.098–0.118 in) wide. The flowers are white, densely woolly-hairy and form a tube 3.25–4 mm (0.128–0.157 in) long. The upper lip of the perianth is 2.0–2.5 mm (0.079–0.098 in) long, 1.5–2.0 mm (0.059–0.079 in) wide, curved backwards and covered with white hairs. The lower lip joined for 1.25–1.50 mm (0.049–0.059 in) with lobes 1.0–1.4 mm (0.039–0.055 in) long and 0.5–0.8 mm (0.020–0.031 in) wide and covered with white and red hairs. Flowering usually occurs from September to November, and the fruit is a reddish-brown nut about 2 mm (0.079 in) long and 2.0–2.25 mm (0.079–0.089 in) wide and covered with silky fawn-coloured hairs.

== Taxonomy ==
This species was first formally described in 1856 by Karl Meissner who gave it the name Conospermum taxifolium var. ? hookeri in de Candolle's Prodromus Systematis Naturalis Regni Vegetabilis. In 1995, Eleanor Marion Bennett raised the variety to species status as Conospermum hookeri in the Flora of Australia. The specific epithet (hookeri) honours William Jackson Hooker.

== Distribution and habitat ==
Tasmanian smokebush usually grows in coastal heathland and heathy forest or woodland between Bruny Island and Cape Barren Island with a disjunct population near Avoca in the Fingal Valley.

== Conservation status ==
Tasmanian smokebush is listed as "vulnerable" under the Australian Government Environment Protection and Biodiversity Conservation Act 1999. The main threats to the species are land clearance and fragmentation, the species' small population size, and dieback caused by Phytophthora cinnamomi.
