= The Images (Tasmania) =

Island in Tasmania, Australia

Coordinates: 43°32′S 146°55′E

The Images is a 0.53 ha group of rocky islets and reefs, part of the Actaeon Island Group, lying close to the south-eastern coast of Tasmania, Australia at the southern entrance to the D'Entrecasteaux Channel between Bruny Island and the mainland.

It is a conservation area.

== Flora and fauna ==
Much of the group is bare of soil or vegetation, but the central section is dominated by dense and stunted blackwoods, matted extensively with blackberries. Recorded breeding seabird and wader species are the Pacific gull and sooty oystercatcher. The metallic skink is present.
