= Friars Club =

Friars Club can refer to:

== Organizations ==
- Friars Club of Beverly Hills, also known as the "Friars Club of California"
- New York Friars Club
- The Friars (club), Louisiana State University, also known as The Friars Club
- The Friars Club, a former name of the LDS Church fraternity Delta Phi Kappa

== Other uses ==
- Friar's Inn, a 1920s jazz venue in Chicago, called "Friars Club" in some sources
- "The Friar's Club", the 128th episode of Seinfeld

== See also ==
- The Friars Senior Society of the University of Pennsylvania, commonly nicknamed "Friars"
- The Friar Society, the oldest honor society at University of Texas at Austin
