= Ocean Conservation Namibia =

Namibian non-profit organization

- Formation: 2020; 6 years ago
- Type: Non-profit environmental organization
- Headquarters: Walvis Bay, Namibia
- Website: https://www.ocnamibia.org

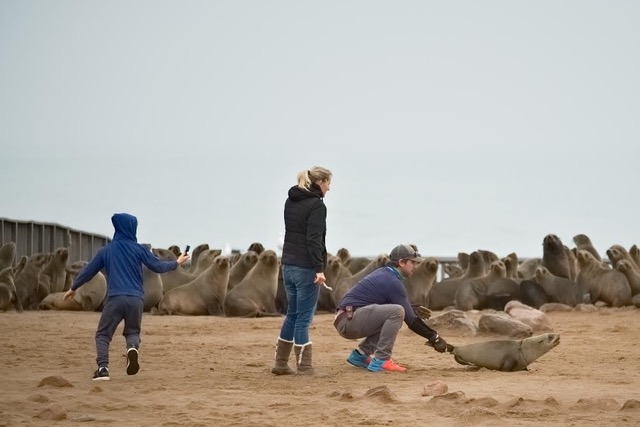
Ocean Conservation Namibia rescuing an entangled seal in Namibia.

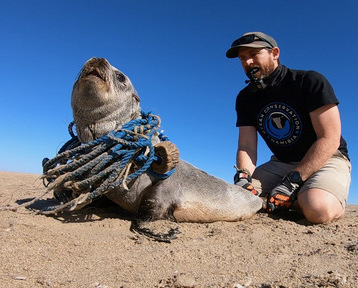
Seal rescue

Ocean Conservation Namibia (OCN) is a non-profit organization based on the central coast of Namibia, founded by Naude and Katja Dreyer in 2020 to create global awareness of ocean and plastic pollution and its impact on animals, specifically seals.

OCN focuses mainly on an area called Pelican Point, on the Skeleton Coast near Walvis Bay.

As of March 2024, OCN had rescued approximately 3,000 seals trapped in marine debris since 2020. During the COVID-19 pandemic, videos of these rescues went viral on YouTube and TikTok. A documentary was made about OCN in 2023 called Cutting the Line, which won multiple film festival awards.

As of March 2024, OCN was funded by donations and had a team of seven.

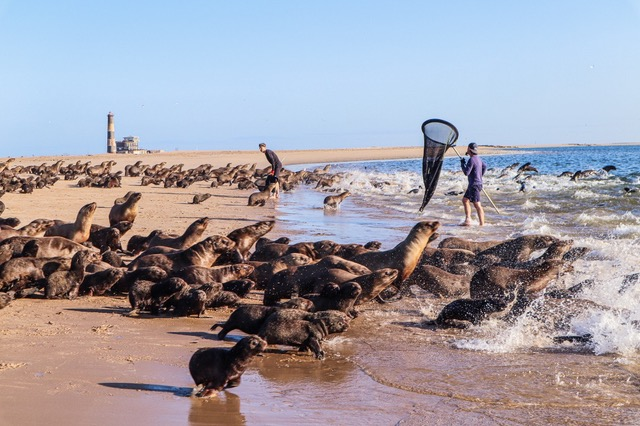
Ocean Conservation Namibia catching seals and other marine animals entangled in marine debris in Namibia.
