= The Friars (Tasmania) =

Island in Tasmania, Australia

Coordinates: 43°31′S 147°17′E

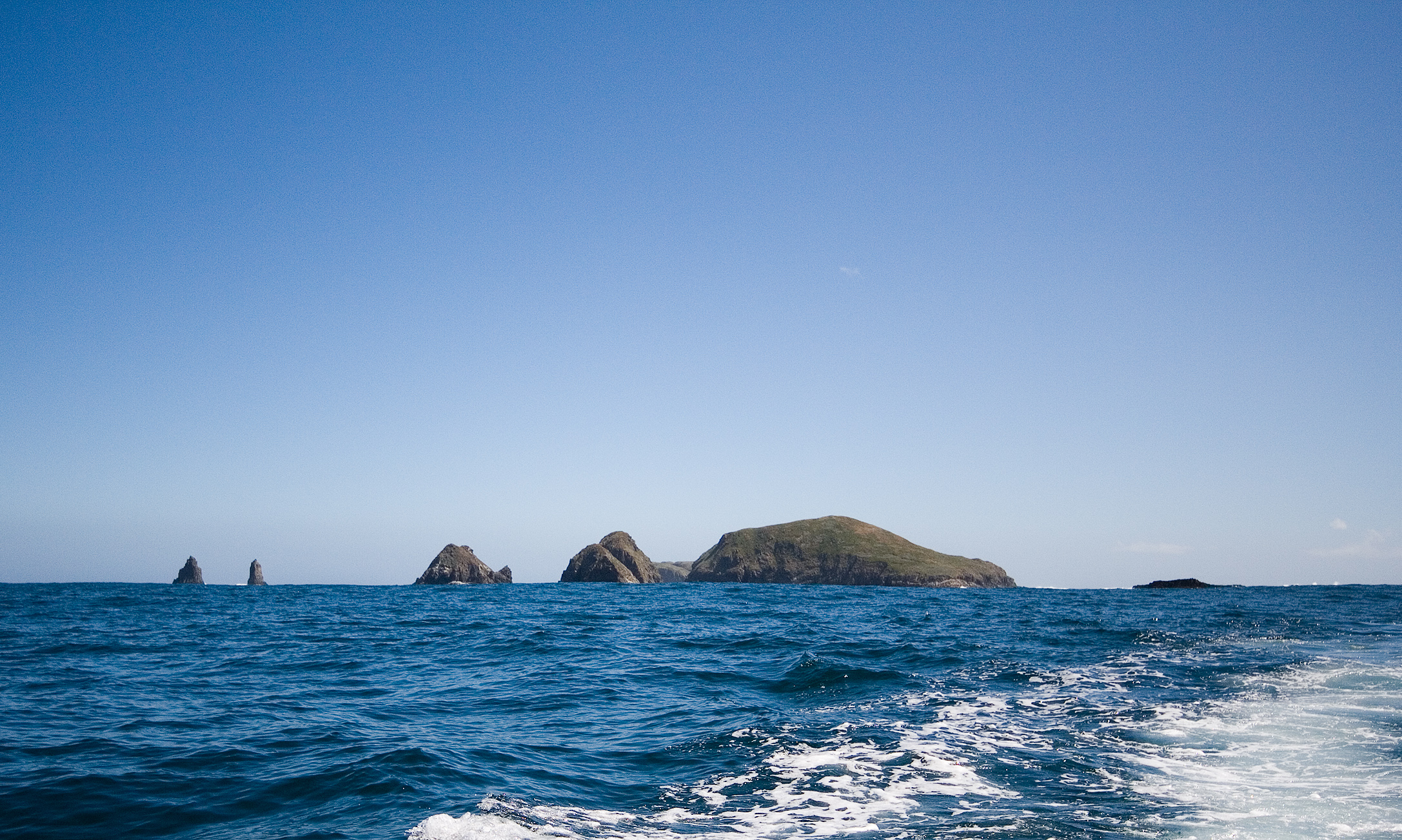
The Friar Island group

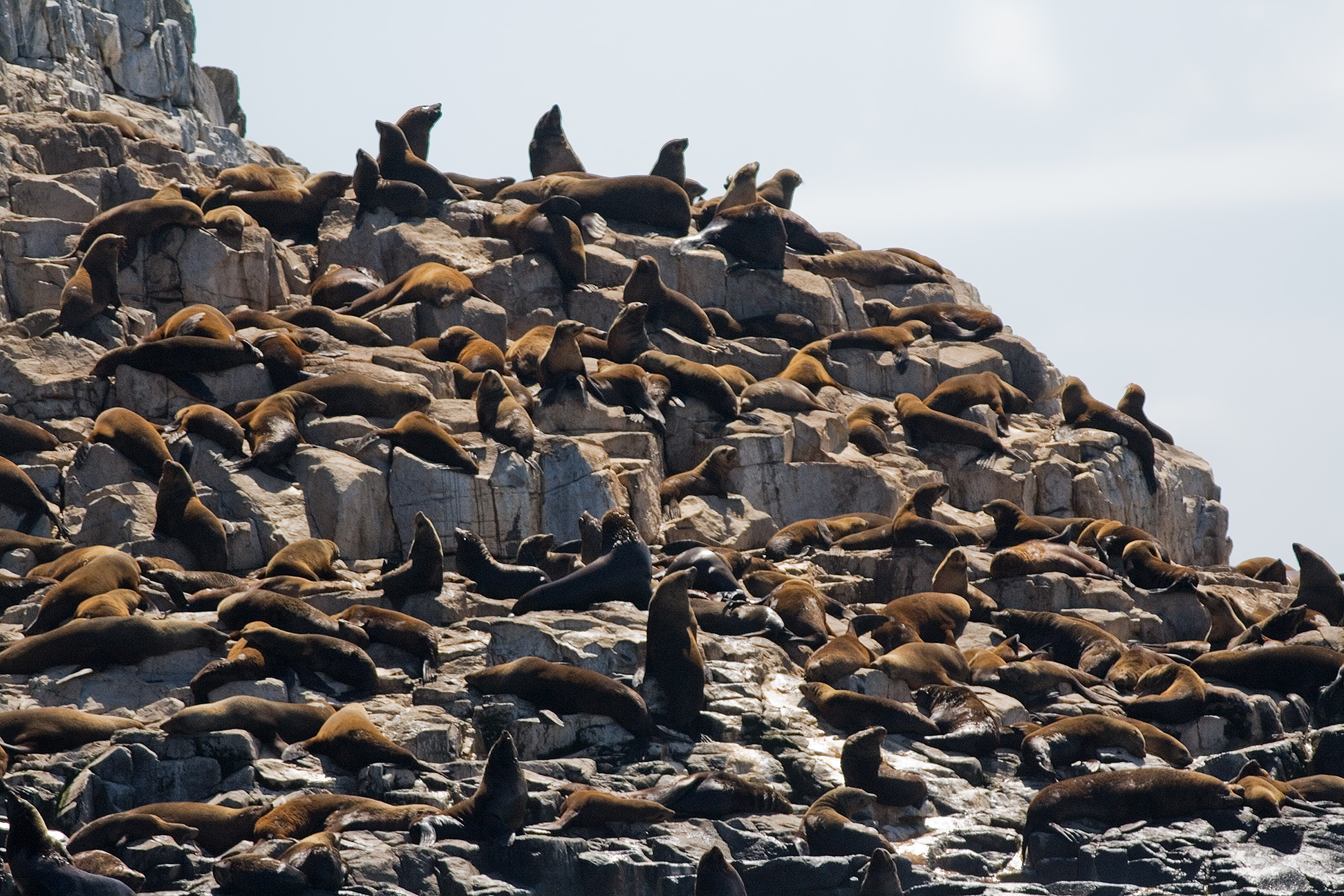
Australian fur seal colony, Friar Island

The Friars are four steep dolerite rocks, with a combined area of about 17 ha (42 acres), in south-eastern Australia. They are part of the Actaeon Island Group, lying close to the south-eastern coast of Tasmania, at the southern entrance to the D'Entrecasteaux Channel between Bruny Island and the mainland. They form part of South Bruny National Park.

The group was named The Fryars by Tobias Furneaux in Adventure in March 1773.

== Fauna ==
Recorded breeding seabird species are the little penguin, short-tailed shearwater, fairy prion and common diving-petrel. The metallic skink is present. Australian fur seals, and possibly New Zealand fur seals, use the rocks as a regular haul-out site.
