= Fountain (disambiguation) =

A fountain is a piece of architecture that pours or jets water for drinking or for decorative effect.

Fountain or Fountains may also refer to:

== Arts and entertainment ==
- Fountain (1988 film), a Russian film directed by Yuri Mamin
- Fountain (Duchamp), a 1917 sculpture by Marcel Duchamp
- Fountain (juggling), a juggling pattern
- "Fountain", a song by PJ Harvey from the 1992 album Dry
- "Fountain (I Am Good)", a song by Mosaic MSC from the 2020 album Human
- "Fountains", a song by Drake from the 2021 album Certified Lover Boy

== People ==
=== Surname ===
- Albert Jennings Fountain (1838–1896), American lawyer and politician
- Ben Fountain (born 1958), American fiction writer
- Cherryl Fountain (born 1950), British artist
- Clarence Fountain (1929–2018), American gospel singer of The Blind Boys of Alabama
- Daurice Fountain (born 1995), American football player
- Hyleas Fountain (born 1981), American heptathlete
- Nigel Fountain (born 1944), British writer and journalist
- Pete Fountain (1930–2016), American jazz clarinetist

=== Given name ===
- Fountain E. Pitts (1808–1874), American Methodist minister and Confederate chaplain
- Fountain Hughes (1848–1957), former slave interviewed by Library of Congress as part of the Federal Writers' Project

== Places ==
=== Canada ===
- Fountain, British Columbia
  - Xaxli'p First Nation, or the Fountain or the Fountain Indian Band, a First Nations government

=== United States ===
- Fountain, Colorado
- Fountain, Florida
- Fountain, Indiana
  - Fontanet, Indiana, also known as Fountain or Fountain Station
  - Fountain County, Indiana
  - William Fountain House, a historic home in DeKalb County, Indiana
- Fountain City, Indiana
- Fountain, Michigan
- Fountain, Minnesota
- Fountain, North Carolina
- Fountain City, Knoxville, Tennessee
- Fountain, West Virginia
- Fountain, Wisconsin
- Fountain City, Wisconsin
- Fountain County, Jefferson Territory 1859–1861

=== Elsewhere ===
- Fountain, U.S. Virgin Islands

== Other uses ==
- Fountain (heraldry), a roundel with wavy blue and white stripes in heraldry
- Fountain (markup language), an open-source markup language for screenwriting
- Fountain F.C., a Nigerian football club
- Fountain syndrome, a congenital disorder
- Fountain University, in Osogbo, Nigeria
- Drinking fountain, a fountain designed to provide drinking water
- Soda fountain, a carbonated drink dispenser
- Gerb (pyrotechnic), or fountain, a type of firework

== See also ==
- The Fountain (disambiguation)
- Fountain Creek (disambiguation)
- Fountain Hill (disambiguation)
- Fountain House (disambiguation)
- Fountain of Youth (disambiguation)
- Fountain Square (disambiguation)
- Fountain Township (disambiguation)
- Fountain Valley (disambiguation)
- Centennial Fountain (disambiguation)
- Fountaine, a surname
- Fountains Abbey, a ruined monastery in Yorkshire, England
- Fountains Fell, a mountain in the Yorkshire Dales, England
- Wallace fountains
