= Fountain House =

Fountain House may refer to:

== Buildings ==
- Fountain House (Saint Petersburg), a palace in Russia
- The Fountain House (Doylestown, Pennsylvania), U.S., an NRHP-listed place
- Fountain House, 7207 Ventura Avenue, Jacksonville, Florida, U.S., an NRHP-listed place in the San Jose Estates Thematic Resource Area
- William Fountain House, Garrett, Indiana, U.S., an NRHP-listed place

== Other uses ==
- Fountain House (nonprofit organization), a 1943-founded support group that created the Clubhouse model of psychosocial rehabilitation

== See also ==
- Fountain (disambiguation)
- The Fountain (disambiguation)
- The Fountain (Yadkin Valley, North Carolina), U.S., or Walnut Fountain and the Colonel Davenport House
- Fountain-Bessac House, Manchester, Michigan, U.S.
- Fountain Elms, a historic house in Utica, New York, U.S.
- Fountain Lake Farm, Montello, Wisconsin, U.S.
- Fountain Park Chautauqua, Remington, Indiana, U.S.
- Fountain Plaza Apartments, Evanston, Illinois, U.S.
- Fountain-Tallman Soda Works, Placerville, California, U.S.
- Fountainhead (Jackson, Mississippi), U.S.
