= Fountain City =

Fountain City may refer to the following places in the U.S.:

- Fountain City, Indiana
- Fountain City, Knoxville, Tennessee
- Fountain City, Wisconsin

== See also ==
- Fountain (disambiguation)#Places
