= John Augustus Nyden =

Swedish American architect (1878–1932)

John Augustus Nydén
- Born: March 25, 1878; Moheda, Sweden
- Died: September 4, 1932 (aged 54); U.S.
- Other name: John A. Nyden
- Occupation: Architect

John Augustus Nydén (March 25, 1878–September 4, 1932), was a Swedish-born American architect. Several buildings he designed are listed on the National Register of Historic Places. Nyden served as State architect of Illinois in 1926 and 1927.

== Biography ==
John Augustus Nyden was born on March 25, 1878, in Nybygget neighborhood of Moheda, Sweden. He immigrated to the United States when he was age 16 or 17. Nyden studied at Valparaiso University in Valparaiso, Indiana. He worked for one year in New York City at George A. Fuller Company. He continued his architecture studies at the School of the Art Institute of Chicago, followed by the University of Illinois.

In 1904, he passed the architect's examination. In 1926 he incorporated his business under John A. Nyden Co. He served as State architect of Illinois in 1926 and 1927. He was a member of the Illinois Society of Architects, the Construction Division Association, and the Swedish Historical Society.

In 1902, he married Alma Ottilia in Chicago, and they had two children. He was a founder of the Edgewater Swedish Mission Church (or Edgewater Mission Covenant Church) in Chicago.

Nyden died on September 4, 1932. North Park University in Chicago has a collection of his papers

== Works ==
- Eastwood by the Lake (1912), 811 West Eastwood Avenue, Chicago, Illinois; formerly Eastwood Beach Apartment Hotel, a hotel renovated as a condo apartment building
- American Swedish Historical Museum, Franklin Delano Roosevelt Park, Philadelphia, Pennsylvania
- George E. Van Hagen House (1912), Barrington Hills, Illinois
- Westminster (Evanston, Illinois) (1912), Evanston, Illinois; apartment building and NRHP-listed
- Stoneleigh Manor (1913), Evanston, Illinois
- Building at 257 East Delaware (1917), Chicago, Illinois
- Goddard Chapel (1918), Rose Hill Cemetery, Marion, Illinois
- Fountain Plaza Apartments (1922), 830-856 Hinman Avenue, Evanston, Illinois; NRHP-listed
- Victory Monument (1927), 35th Street and King Drive, Chicago, Illinois; NRHP-listed, he designed the monument which was sculpted by Leonard Crunelle
- Belmont–Sheffield Trust and Savings Bank Building (1928), 1001 West Belmont Avenue, Chicago, Illinois; NRHP-listed
