= Belmont–Sheffield Trust and Savings Bank Building =

- U.S. National Register of Historic Places
- Chicago Landmark
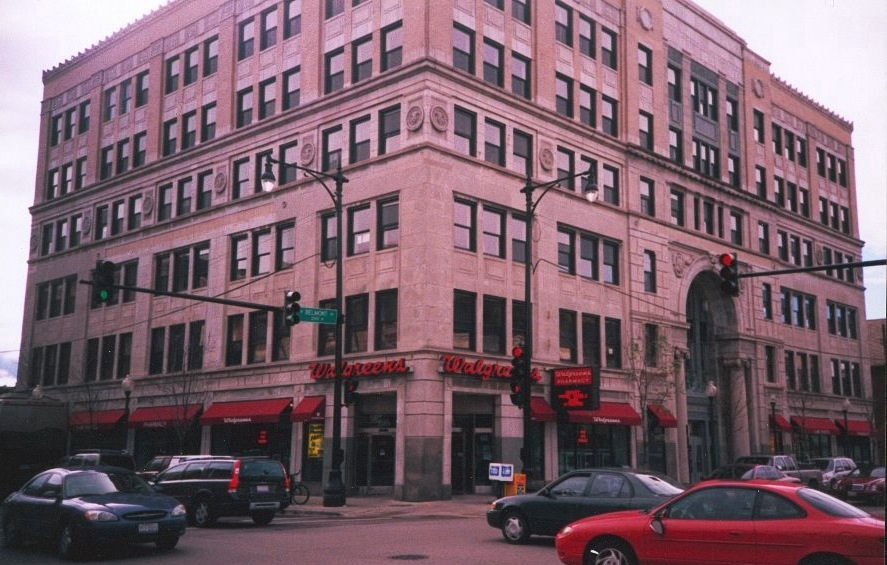

- Location within Chicago Location within Illinois Location within the United States
- Location: 1001 W. Belmont Ave., Chicago, Illinois
- Coordinates: 41°56′24.1″N 87°39′15.3″W
- Built: 1928
- Architect: John A. Nyden
- Architectural style: Art Deco
- NRHP reference No.: 84000931

Significant dates
- Added to NRHP: March 1, 1984
- Designated CHICL: July 9, 2008

The Belmont–Sheffield Trust and Savings Bank Building is a historic building built in 1928 and located at 1001 W. Belmont Avenue, Chicago, Illinois, United States. It is listed as one of the National Register of Historic Places since 1984.

== History ==
The six-story building was designed by architect John A. Nyden. It was constructed in a U-shape around a two-story central atrium, which allowed light to reach the bank lobby—the glass atrium has since been roofed over.

When the building was first completed, it held the Belmont–Sheffield Trust and Savings Bank on the first floor and part of the second; offices on the rest of the second floor and on the third floor; and the Montfield Hotel (address 3146 N. Sheffield) on floors four through six. However, the bank closed on June 24, 1932, due to financial difficulty following the Great Depression. The bank portion of the building then remained vacant until World War II, when local rationing board 40-46 took over the space. The building also housed the Lake View Citizens' Council in the 1950s.

It struggled with vacancy until 1984, when a developer received a federal loan to convert the Montfield Hotel into 54 apartments, maintaining stores on the ground floor. The building was sold again to another developer and the upper floors converted into loft condos in 2005, which are now listed at the address 3150 N. Sheffield. In 2008, the Commission on Chicago Landmarks designated the building a landmark along with 15 other neighborhood bank buildings.

Closer views
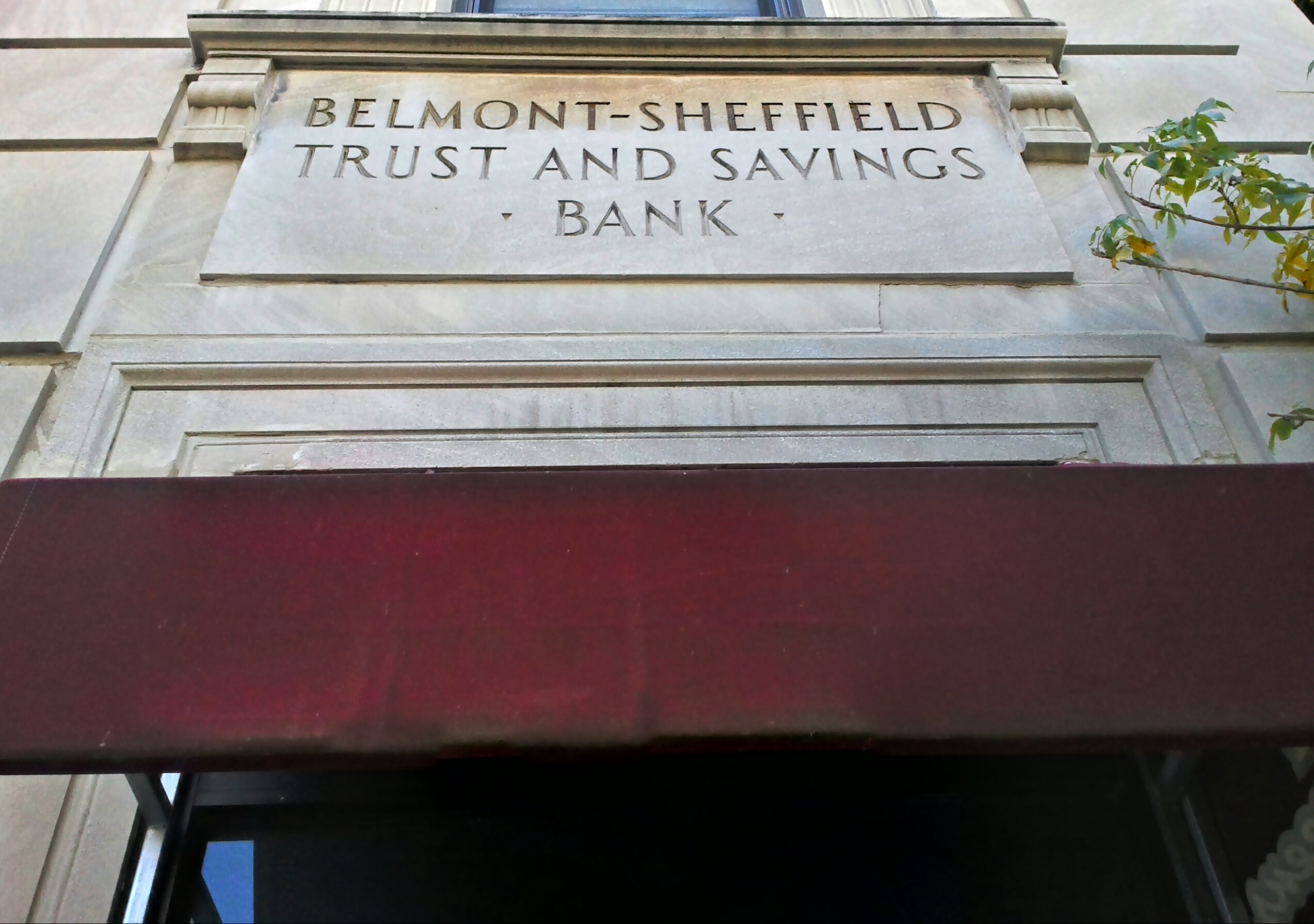
The marquee is also near the entrance on Belmont Avenue.

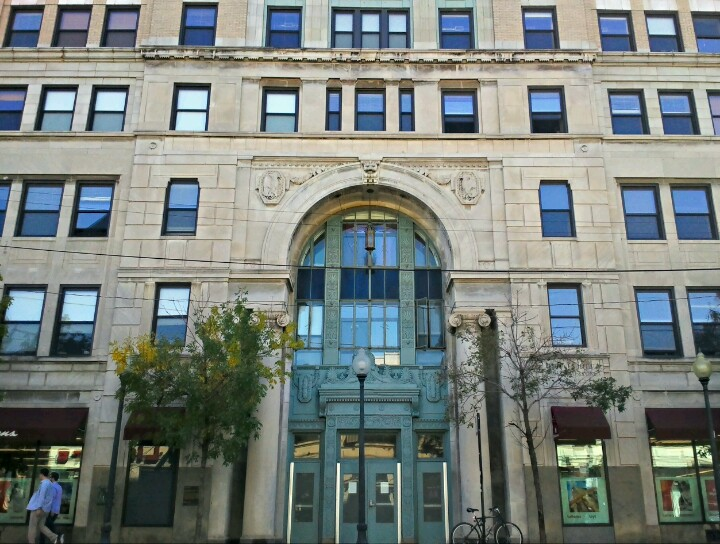
The monumental arched entrance on Belmont Avenue in the Classical Revival-style is an outstanding feature.
