= Henry Roettiger =

American politician

Henry Roettiger, Jr. (June 7, 1861 – September 1, 1933) was an American businessman and politician.

Born in Fountain City, Buffalo County, Wisconsin, Roettiger was a general contractor and owned Roettiger Lumber Company in Fountain City. He was also in the bank business. Roettiger served as clerk, treasurer and mayor of Fountain City. He also served on the Buffalo County Board of Supervisors and was chairman of the county board. Roettiger was also the Buffalo County treasurer. In 1899, Roettiger served in the Wisconsin State Assembly and was a Republican. Roettiger died in Fountain Lake, Wisconsin as a result of a stroke.
