= The Fountain (disambiguation) =

The Fountain is a 2006 American film.

The Fountain may also refer to:

- The Fountain (comics), a 2005 graphic novel based on the original script of the 2006 film
- The Fountain (soundtrack), the soundtrack album of the score to the 2006 film
- The Fountain (album), a 2009 album by Echo & the Bunnymen
- The Fountain (Yadkin Valley, North Carolina), a historic plantation home
- The Fountain (1934 film), a 1934 film starring Ann Harding
- The Fountain (magazine), a bi-monthly magazine of scientific and spiritual thought
- The Fountain, a 1923 play by Eugene O'Neill
- The Fountain (novel), a 1932 novel by Charles Langbridge Morgan

== See also ==
- Fountain (disambiguation)
- Fountain House (disambiguation)
- The Fountainhead
