= Eastwood by the Lake =

Apartment building in Chicago, Illinois

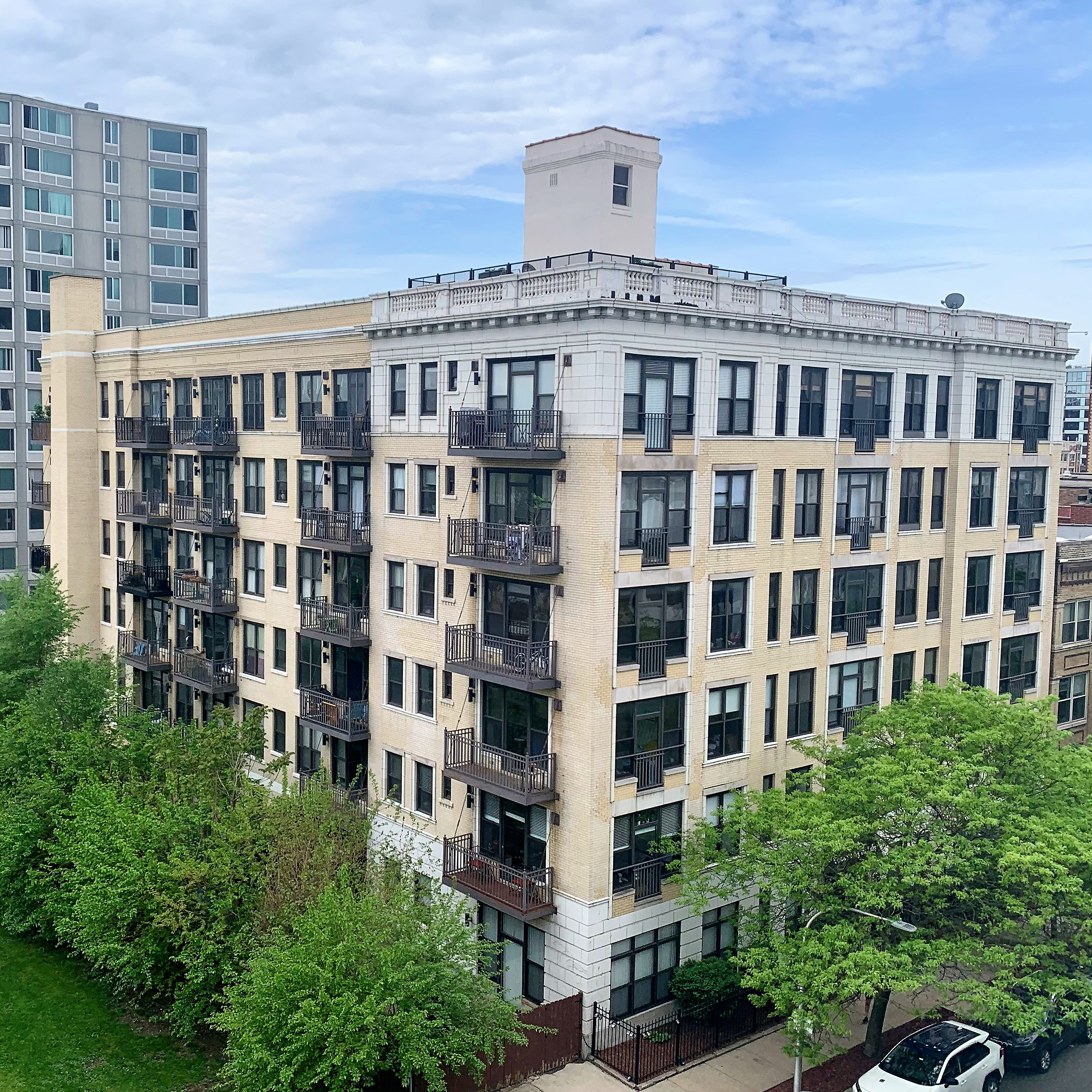
- Interactive map of the Eastwood by the Lake area
- Former names: Eastwood Beach Apartment Hotel

General information
- Type: Residential
- Location: Chicago, IL, 811 W Eastwood Ave, Chicago, United States
- Coordinates: 41°57′58″N 87°39′2″W
- Construction started: 1912
- Completed: 1917

Technical details
- Floor count: 6

Design and construction
- Architect: John A. Nyden

Eastwood By The Lake, formerly known as Eastwood Beach Apartment Hotel, is a condominium and apartment building in the Uptown neighborhood of Chicago, Illinois, United States. It is the oldest known residential hotel built in Chicago during the twentieth century. It was designed in 1912 by architect John Augustus Nyden as a unique hotel with 25 balconies, lounging room, and a rooftop ballroom next to "the beach".

== Design ==
Eastwood By The Lake was designed in 1912 by architect John Augustus Nyden. The original fireproof construction consisted of eighty apartments and boasted the proximity to Clarendon Avenue Beach. One unique feature was that it featured specially designed kitchenettes.

It was renovated in the 2000s, and is located across the street from the Louis A. Weiss Memorial Hospital.
