= William A. Thompson =

American engineer

William A. Thompson (born December 16, 1864, in Greenwich, New York – 1925) was an engineer with the United States Army Corps of Engineers who managed improvements on the Mississippi River.

== Thompson's career ==
Thompson attended high school in Greenwich, and college at the University of Vermont with a degree in civil engineering in 1878. He joined the U.S. Army Corps of Engineers that year. He worked at Rock Island, Illinois, until 1885. He was then placed in charge of the suboffice in La Crosse, Wisconsin. In 1896 he moved to La Crosse, and was appointed the Assistant Engineer in charge of the improvements on the Mississippi River from Winona, Minnesota, to Prairie du Chien, Wisconsin. He held that post until his death in 1925.

== Dredge named after Thompson ==
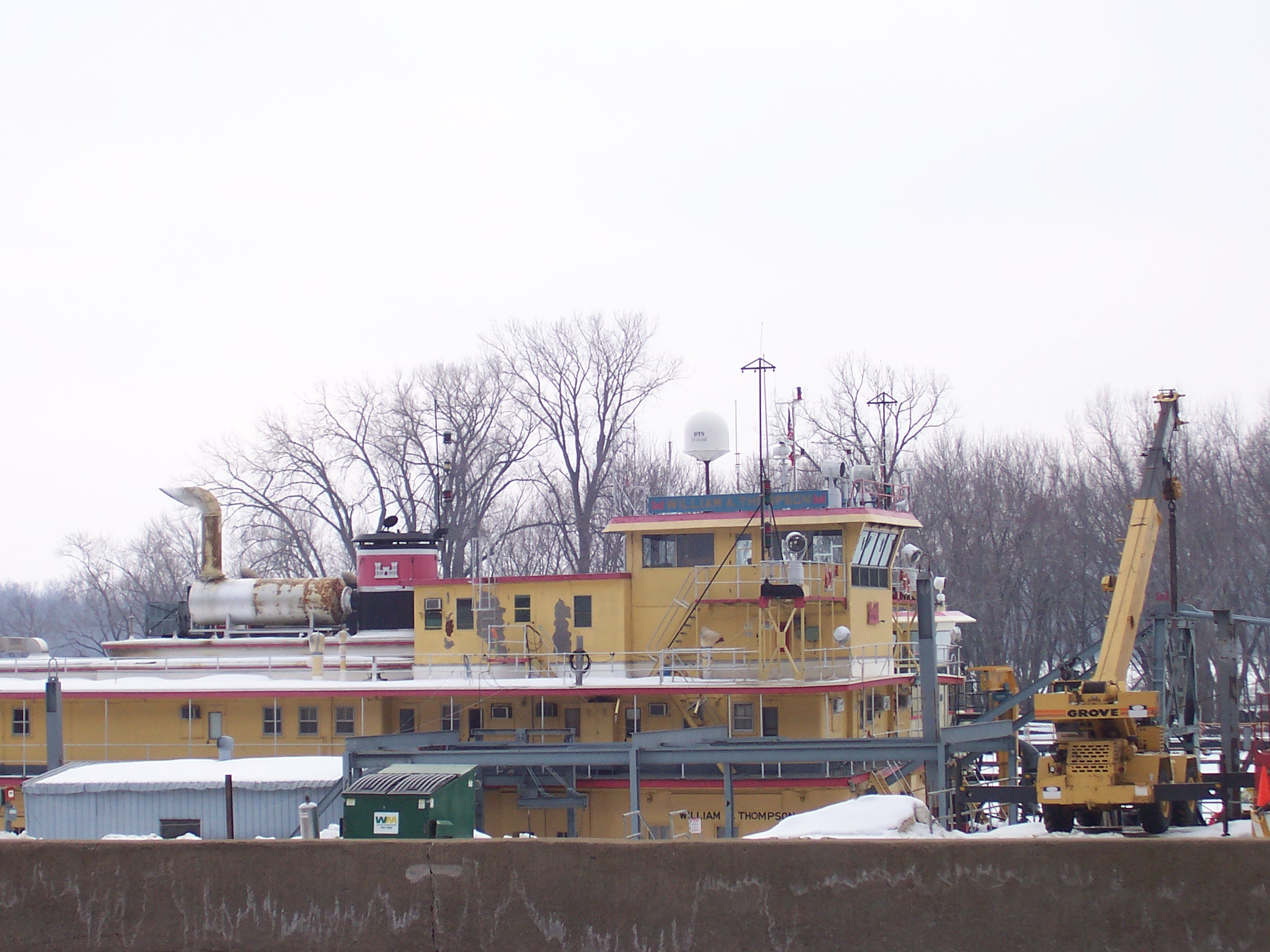
The William A. Thompson in Fountain City, WI

A USACE dredge is named after him was designed in 1935. The dredge was built by Dravo Corporation, and christened in 1937 by Thompson's granddaughter. The dredge arrived in its home in Fountain City, Wisconsin, on May 22, 1937. It worked on the upper Mississippi River, St. Croix River, and Illinois River until 2006.
