= Stoneleigh Manor =

- U.S. National Register of Historic Places
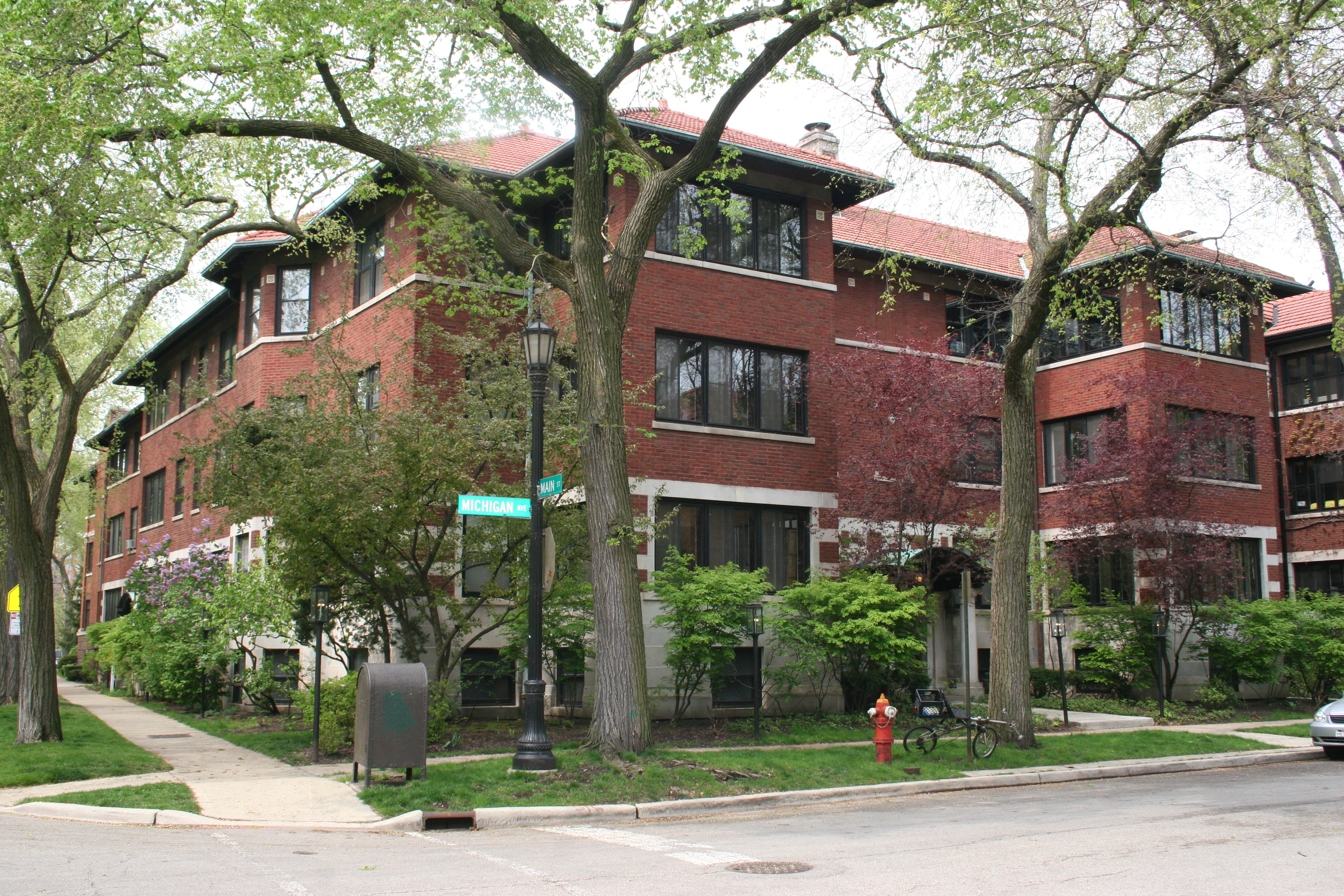
- Stoneleigh Manor in 2012

- Location within Chicago metropolitan area Location within Illinois Location within the United States
- Location: 904-906 Michigan Ave. and 227-229 Main St., Evanston, Illinois
- Coordinates: 42°02′02″N 87°40′25″W
- Area: 0.3 acres (0.12 ha)
- Built: 1913
- Architect: John A. Nyden
- Architectural style: Prairie School
- MPS: Suburban Apartment Buildings in Evanston TR
- NRHP reference No.: 84001057
- Added to NRHP: March 15, 1984

Stoneleigh Manor is a historic apartment building at the northwest corner of Michigan Avenue and Main Street in Evanston, Illinois. The three-story brick building was built in 1913. Architect John A. Nyden, an Evanston resident who designed several apartment buildings in the city, designed the building in the Prairie School style. The building's design includes canopied entrances flanked by columns and leadlights, limestone banding, and wide overhanging eaves. Each floor of the building has four rooms, which included amenities such as sunrooms, fireplaces, a vacuum cleaning system, and maid's rooms in some units.

The building was added to the National Register of Historic Places on March 15, 1984.
