= Westminster (Evanston, Illinois) =

- U.S. National Register of Historic Places
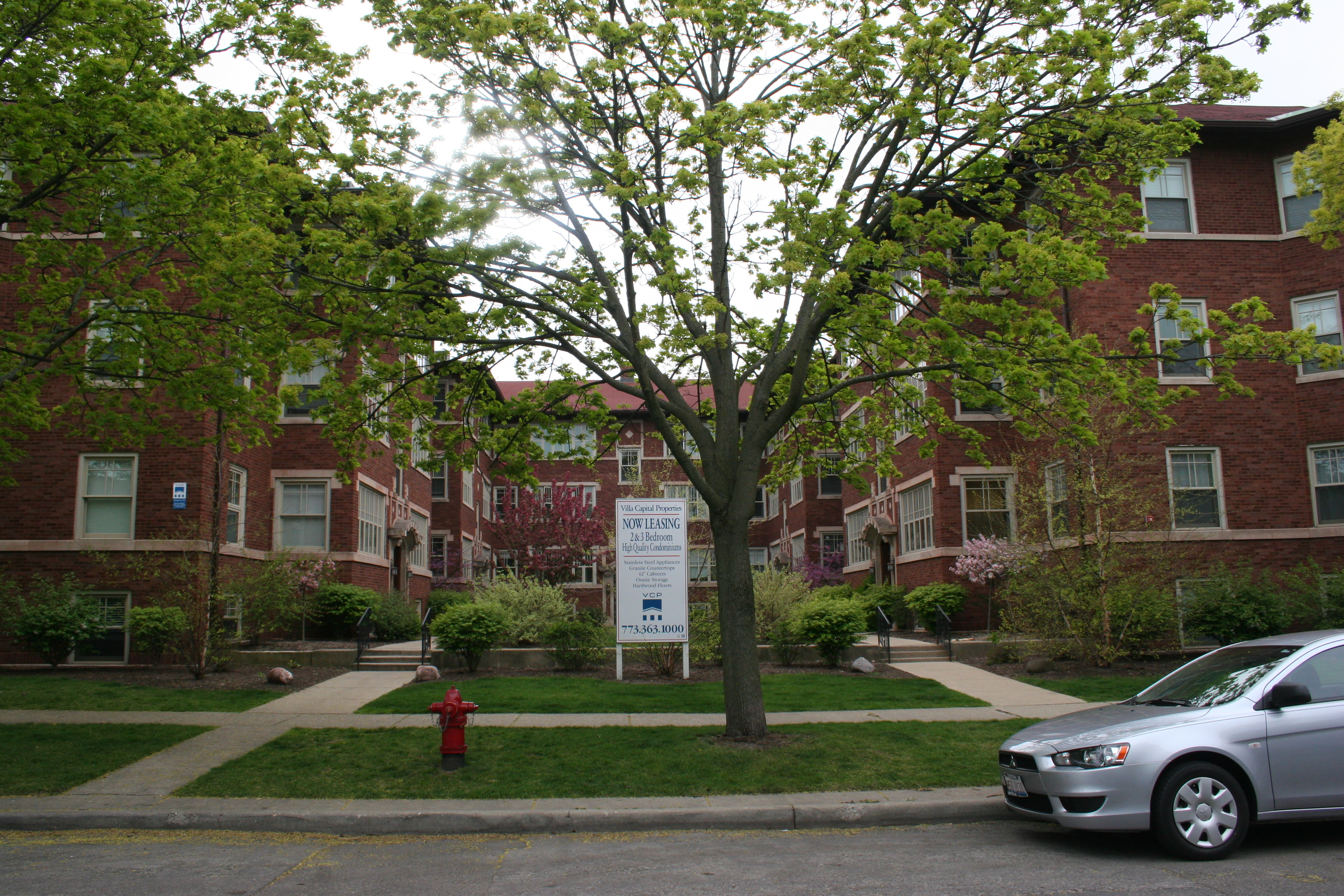
- Westminster in 2012

- Location within Chicago metropolitan area Location within Illinois Location within the United States
- Location: 632-640 Hinman Ave., Evanston, Illinois
- Coordinates: 42°01′47″N 87°40′39″W
- Area: 0.7 acres (0.28 ha)
- Built: 1912
- Architect: John A. Nyden
- Architectural style: Prairie School
- MPS: Suburban Apartment Buildings in Evanston TR
- NRHP reference No.: 84001061
- Added to NRHP: March 15, 1984

Westminster is a historic apartment building at 632-640 Hinman Avenue in Evanston, Illinois. The three-story brick building was built in 1912. The building has a U-shaped layout with a wide central courtyard. Architect John A. Nyden, who lived in Evanston and designed several other apartment buildings in the city, designed the Prairie School building. The building's design features limestone banding, arched entrances, wood mullions on the windows, and a hipped roof with a bracketed cornice.

The building was added to the National Register of Historic Places on March 15, 1984.
