= Fountain Creek (disambiguation) =

Fountain Creek is a tributary of the Arkansas River in Colorado, U.S.

Fountain Creek may also refer to:

- Fountain Creek (Tennessee), a stream in Tennessee, U.S.
- Fountain Creek Township, Iroquois County, Illinois, U.S.
- Fountain Creek Bridge, a limestone arch bridge in Monroe County, Illinois, U.S.
