= Fountain Square =

Fountain Square may refer to:

- Fountain Square, Cincinnati, Ohio, U.S.
- Fountain Square, Indianapolis, Indiana, U.S.
- Fountains Square, Baku, Azerbaijan

== See also ==
- Fountain (disambiguation)
