= Goodyear Block =

- U.S. National Register of Historic Places
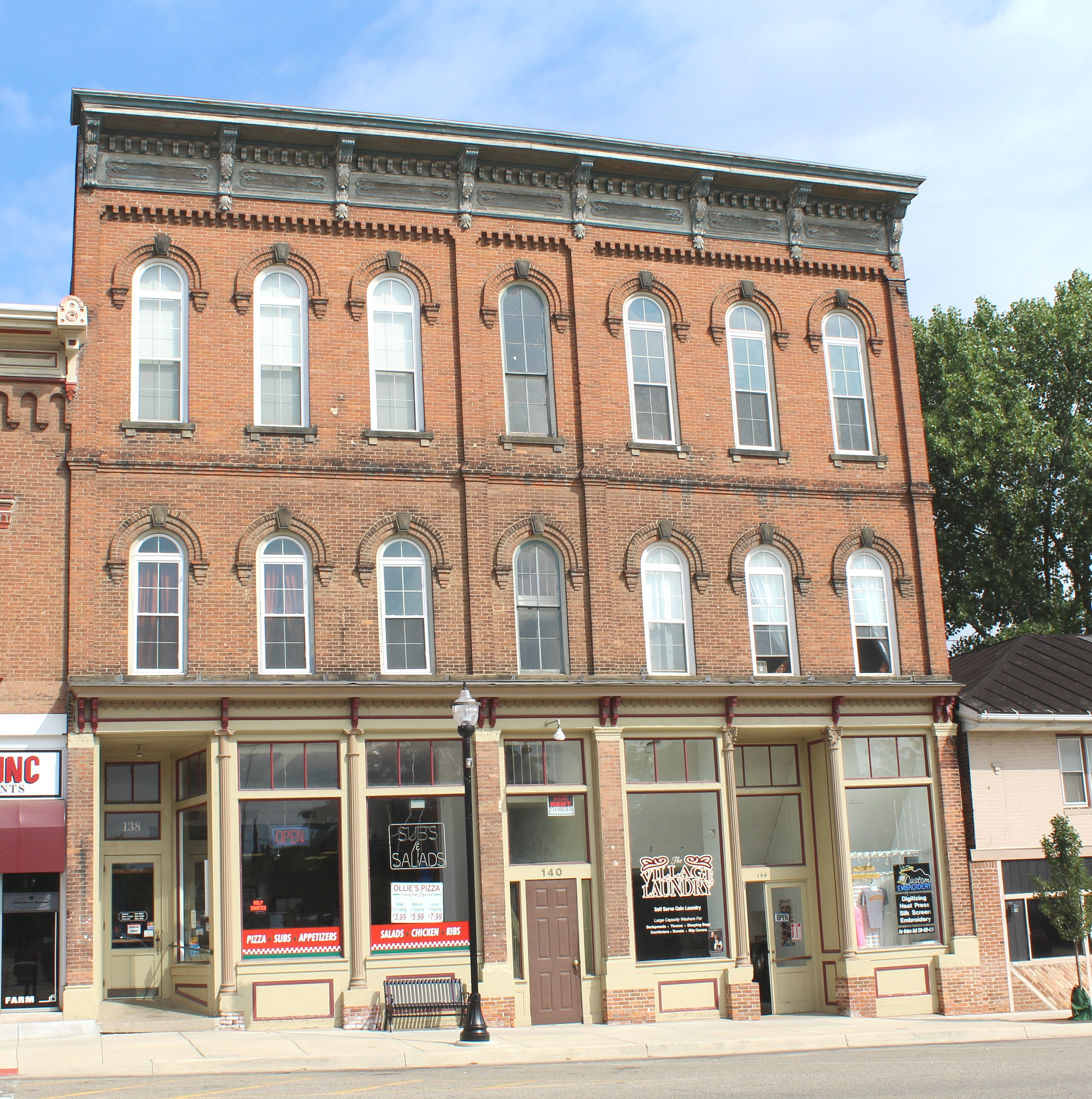
- Goodyear Block

- Location within Michigan Location within the United States
- Interactive map
- Location: 138 E. Main St., Manchester, Michigan
- Coordinates: 42°9′0″N 84°2′21″W
- Area: less than one acre
- Built by: Chauncey Walbridge
- Architectural style: Italianate
- NRHP reference No.: 93000770
- Added to NRHP: August 5, 1993

The Goodyear Block, also known as the Arbeiter Block, is a commercial building located at 138 E. Main Street in Manchester, Michigan, US. It was listed on the National Register of Historic Places in 1993.

== History ==
The Goodyear Block was built in 1867 by Chauncey Walbridge for Henry Goodyear. The two first-floor retail spaces were let out a hardware store operated by Miller & Webb, and a dry goods store operated by the Wastell Brothers. The offices on the second floor were let out to numerous businesses, including the Manchester Enterprise newspaper. The third-floor auditorium of the building was used for dances, plays, commencements, and concerts, all of which contributed to making downtown Manchester the social center of the area. Goodyear, however, fell on hard times, lost control of his building, and moved to Nebraska. In 1894, Goodyear's creditors sold the building to the Arbeiter Society (or "Arbeiter Verein"), a German club. They ran it for 50 years; the hall was used as a classroom in the 1930s. The building was later used by the American Legion, and eventually abandoned. In 1977, it became the home of the Black Sheep Repertory Theater. The building was rehabilitated in 1990, and the top floors turned into apartments.

== Description ==
The Goodyear Block is a rectangular three-story Italianate commercial building constructed of red brick on a fieldstone foundation. The building is seven bays wide, with the central bay enclosing a staircase to the upper floors and the surrounding two sets of three bays each containing a storefront. The first-floor facade has large display windows flanked by cast-iron columns; the appearance the first floor is the result of the 1990 restoration, but is similar to the original building construction. The front facade also features round headed windows capped with a keystone, and is surmounted by a wooden cornice. Inside, the first floor is commercial space, the second floor is office space, and the third floor is given over to the auditorium.
