= Manchester, Michigan =

- City
- City of Manchester
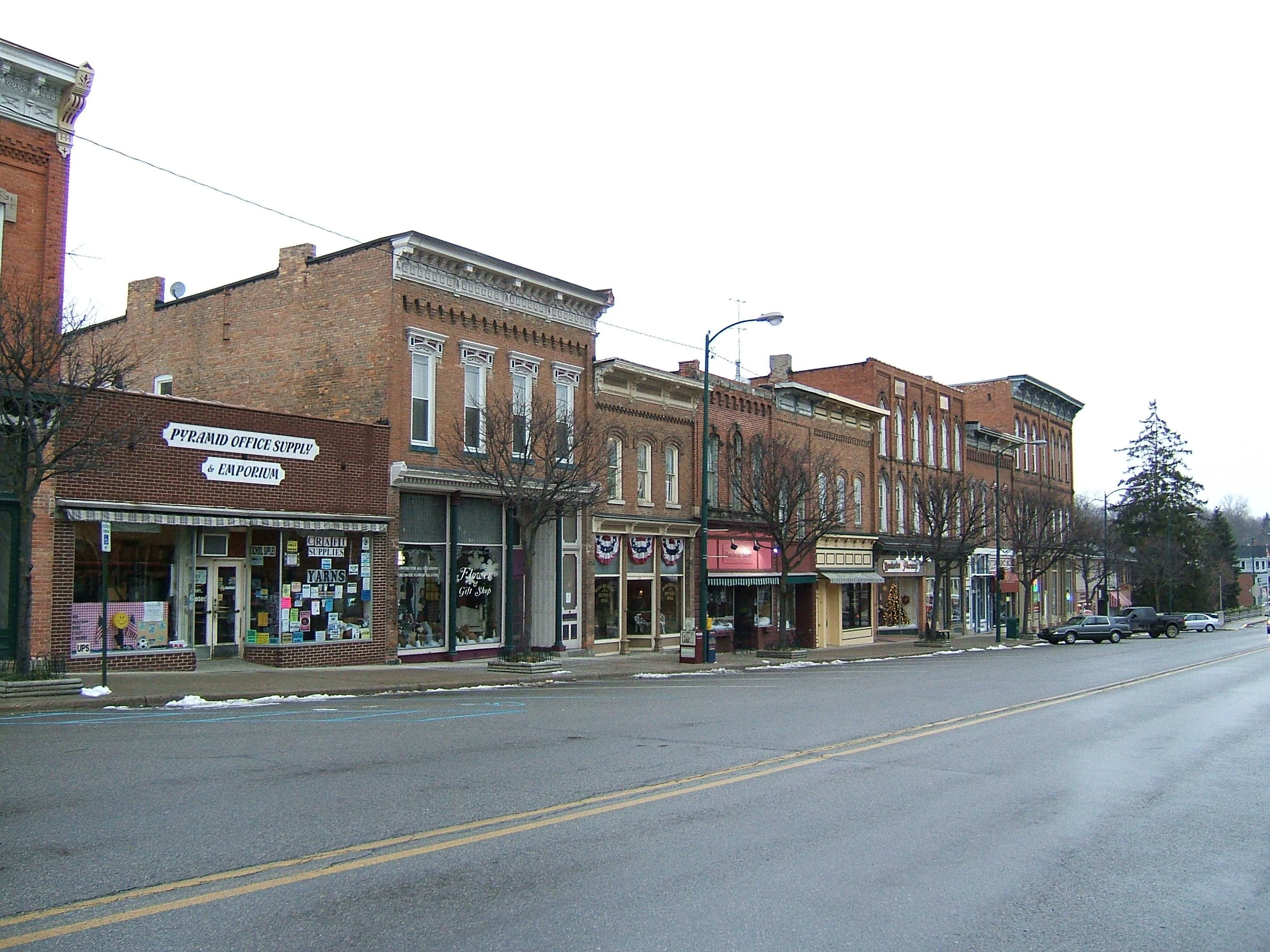
- Downtown Manchester along Main Street

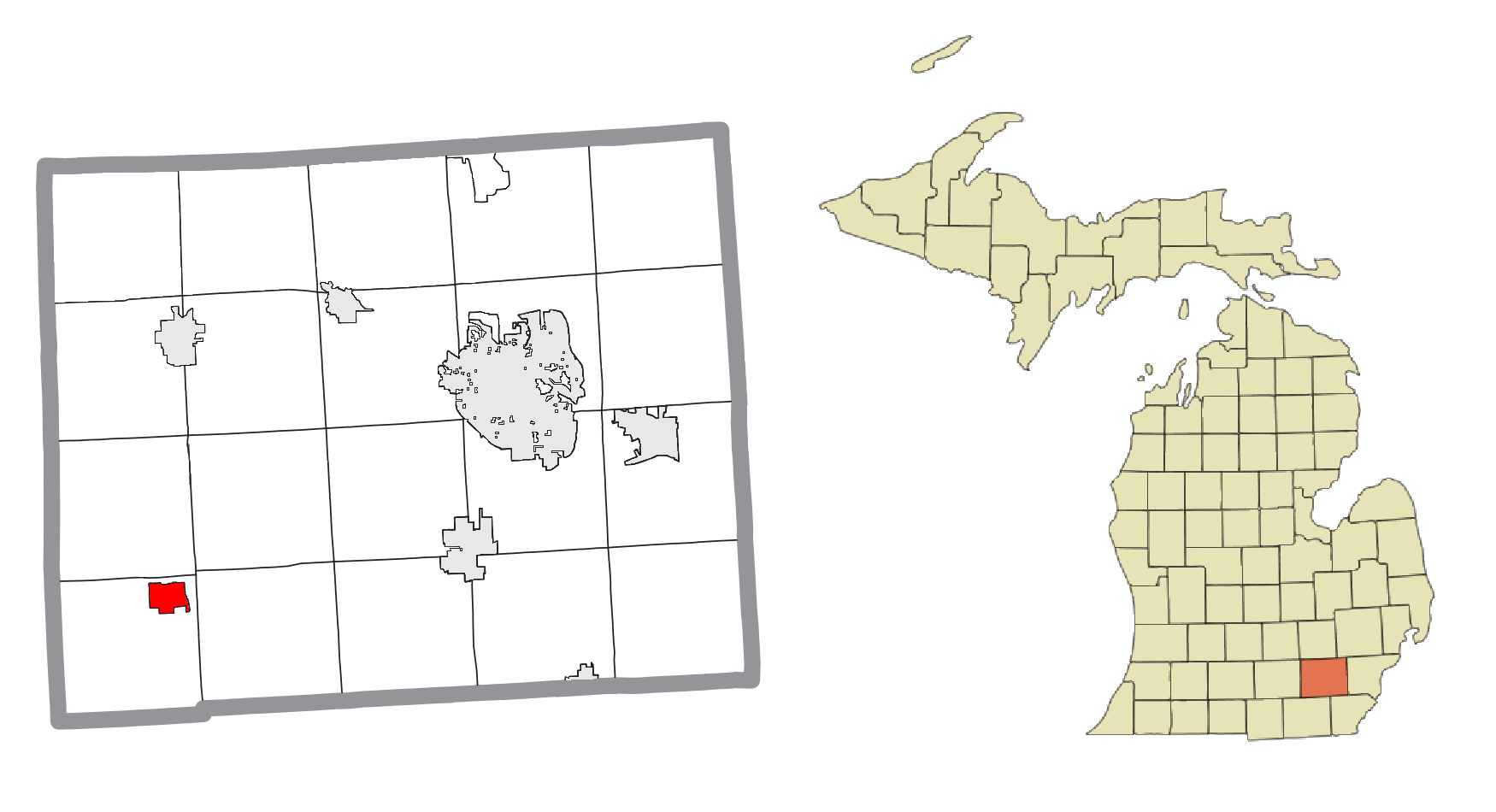
- Location within Washtenaw County

- Location within the state of Michigan Location within the United States
- Coordinates: 42°08′58″N 84°02′02″W
- Country: United States
- State: Michigan
- County: Washtenaw
- Settled: 1833
- Incorporated: 1867 (village); 2023 (city)

Government
  - Type: Council–manager
  - President: Patricia Vailliencourt
  - Clerk: Brittany Kuhnle

Area
  - Total: 2.24 sq mi (5.81 km^{2})
  - Land: 2.13 sq mi (5.51 km^{2})
  - Water: 0.12 sq mi (0.31 km^{2})
- Elevation: 899 ft (274 m)

Population (2020)
  - Total: 2,037
  - Density: 957.8/sq mi (369.82/km^{2})
- Time zone: UTC-5 (Eastern (EST))
  - Summer (DST): UTC-4 (EDT)
- ZIP code(s): 48158
- Area code: 734
- FIPS code: 26-50660
- GNIS feature ID: 0631375
- Website: vil-manchester.org

Manchester is a city in Washtenaw County in the U.S. state of Michigan. The population was 2,037 at the 2020 census.

Settled as early as 1833, Manchester incorporated as a village in 1867. On November 7, 2023, 66 percent of village residents voted in favor of incorporating Manchester as an autonomous city. Manchester officially became a city on November 15, 2023 with the mayor and city councilmembers sworn into office on November 20, 2023.

== History ==
=== Chicago Road ===
In 1824 the United States Congress passed the General Survey Act, intended to create and maintain military roads through what was then the west of the country. One third of the funds allocated went to build a road between the strategic army posts of Detroit and Fort Dearborn, at the little town of Chicago. Known as the Chicago Road, it followed the old Sauk Trail and opened the entire area for settlement.

Also in 1824, the land around today's Manchester was surveyed by John Mack, who noted it as being "a good mill seat." John Gilbert, who had recently completed work on sections of the Erie Canal, agreed with John Mack, and on May 10, 1826 he purchased 80 acres (32 ha) of land along the River Raisin at that location.

=== Early village history ===
Originally from upstate New York, John Gilbert resettled to Ypsilanti, Michigan, in 1831. In 1832, he decided to turn his attention to the extensive land tracts he held in the area. He commissioned the construction of a grist mill along the River Raisin upon the land he had purchased in 1826. The original plat of the village of Manchester was prepared by surveyor Hiram Burnham and dated 1833, but was not formally filed until March 25, 1835. The location was chosen to take advantage of water power from the river and named after Manchester, New York.

Construction for a mill on the River Raisin began in 1832 and, a version of the mill has remained into the 21st century though it ceased grist operations in 1981. In 1976, the mill was honored by the Historical Society of Michigan as the oldest operating business on the original site in the State of Michigan.

=== Soulesville ===
In 1833, James Soule purchased a large tract of land about 1-mile (1.6 km) downstream from Manchester. He built a small settlement he named Soulesville. Though the two settlements initially competed against each other, on March 16, 1867, both settlements were incorporated into the village of Manchester. The Manchester Village Office and Manchester Public Library are located on the site of the former settlement.

== Geography ==
According to the U.S. Census Bureau, Manchester has a total area of 2.24 square miles (5.80 km^{2}), of which 2.13 square miles (5.52 km^{2}) is land and 0.12 square miles (0.31 km^{2}) (5.35%) is water.

The River Raisin flows through the city.

=== Major highways ===
- M-52 runs through the center of the city.

== Demographics ==
Historical population
Census	Pop.	Note	%±
1880	1,156		—
1890	1,191		3.0%
1900	1,209		1.5%
1910	1,047		−13.4%
1920	1,024		−2.2%
1930	1,037		1.3%
1940	1,100		6.1%
1950	1,388		26.2%
1960	1,568		13.0%
1970	1,650		5.2%
1980	1,686		2.2%
1990	1,753		4.0%
2000	2,160		23.2%
2010	2,091		−3.2%
2020	2,037		−2.6%
U.S. Decennial Census

=== 2010 census ===
As of the census of 2010, there were 2,091 people, 938 households, and 570 families living in the village. The population density was 986.3 inhabitants per square mile (380.8/km^{2}). There were 1,029 housing units at an average density of 485.4 per square mile (187.4/km^{2}). The racial makeup of the village was 98.3% White, 0.3% African American, 0.2% Native American, 0.3% Asian, 0.1% from other races, and 0.8% from two or more races. Hispanic or Latino of any race were 1.6% of the population.

There were 938 households, of which 28.9% had children under the age of 18 living with them, 43.5% were married couples living together, 12.7% had a female householder with no husband present, 4.6% had a male householder with no wife present, and 39.2% were non-families. 34.0% of all households were made up of individuals, and 12.1% had someone living alone who was 65 years of age or older. The average household size was 2.23 and the average family size was 2.85.

The median age in the village was 41.3 years. 23.3% of residents were under the age of 18; 6.4% were between the ages of 18 and 24; 25.8% were from 25 to 44; 29.1% were from 45 to 64; and 15.2% were 65 years of age or older. The gender makeup of the village was 46.9% male and 53.1% female.

=== 2000 census ===
As of the census of 2000, there were 2,160 people, 900 households, and 584 families living in the village. The population density was 1,201.8 inhabitants per square mile (464.0/km^{2}). There were 949 housing units at an average density of 528.0 per square mile (203.9/km^{2}). The racial makeup of the village was 98.24% White, 0.37% African American, 0.46% Native American, 0.19% Asian, 0.42% from other races, and 0.32% from two or more races. Hispanic or Latino residents of any race were 1.48% of the population.

There were 900 households, out of which 33.3% had children under the age of 18 living with them, 50.2% were married couples living together, 11.8% had a female householder with no husband present, and 35.1% were non-families. 29.4% of all households were made up of individuals, and 11.9% had someone living alone who was 65 years of age or older. The average household size was 2.40 and the average family size was 3.00.

In the village, the population was spread out, with 26.7% under the age of 18, 7.0% from 18 to 24, 30.9% from 25 to 44, 21.1% from 45 to 64, and 14.3% who were 65 years of age or older. The median age was 36 years. For every 100 females, there were 89.6 males. For every 100 females age 18 and over, there were 83.3 males.

The median income for a household in the village was $46,974, and the median income for a family was $56,875. Males had a median income of $43,438 versus $27,396 for females. The per capita income for the village was $24,113. About 4.3% of families and 5.2% of the population were below the poverty line, including 6.3% of those under age 18 and 6.8% of those age 65 or over.

== Education ==
The Michigan Lutheran Seminary first opened in Manchester 1885 but moved to Saginaw two years later.

Manchester is served by its own school district, Manchester Community Schools. The district contains three schools—Luther C. Klager Elementary School, Riverside Intermediate School, and Manchester Junior & Senior High School—all of which are located within the city boundaries. The district serves a very large area that includes portions of several neighboring townships.

== Notable people ==
- Fernando C. Beaman, US Congressman
- Patrick Chapin, Magic: The Gathering ProTour Player and game designer, born and raised in Manchester
- Nick Davis, former NFL wide receiver, born in Manchester and played football for Manchester High School
- Cub Koda, lead singer of Brownsville Station, best known for the 1973 hit song "Smokin' in the Boys Room", which was later covered by Mötley Crüe, graduated from Manchester High School
- John Swainson, the 42nd governor of Michigan (1961–1963) as well as Justice of the Michigan Supreme Court (1971–1975), resided in Manchester from the mid-1970s until his death in 1994.

== Images ==
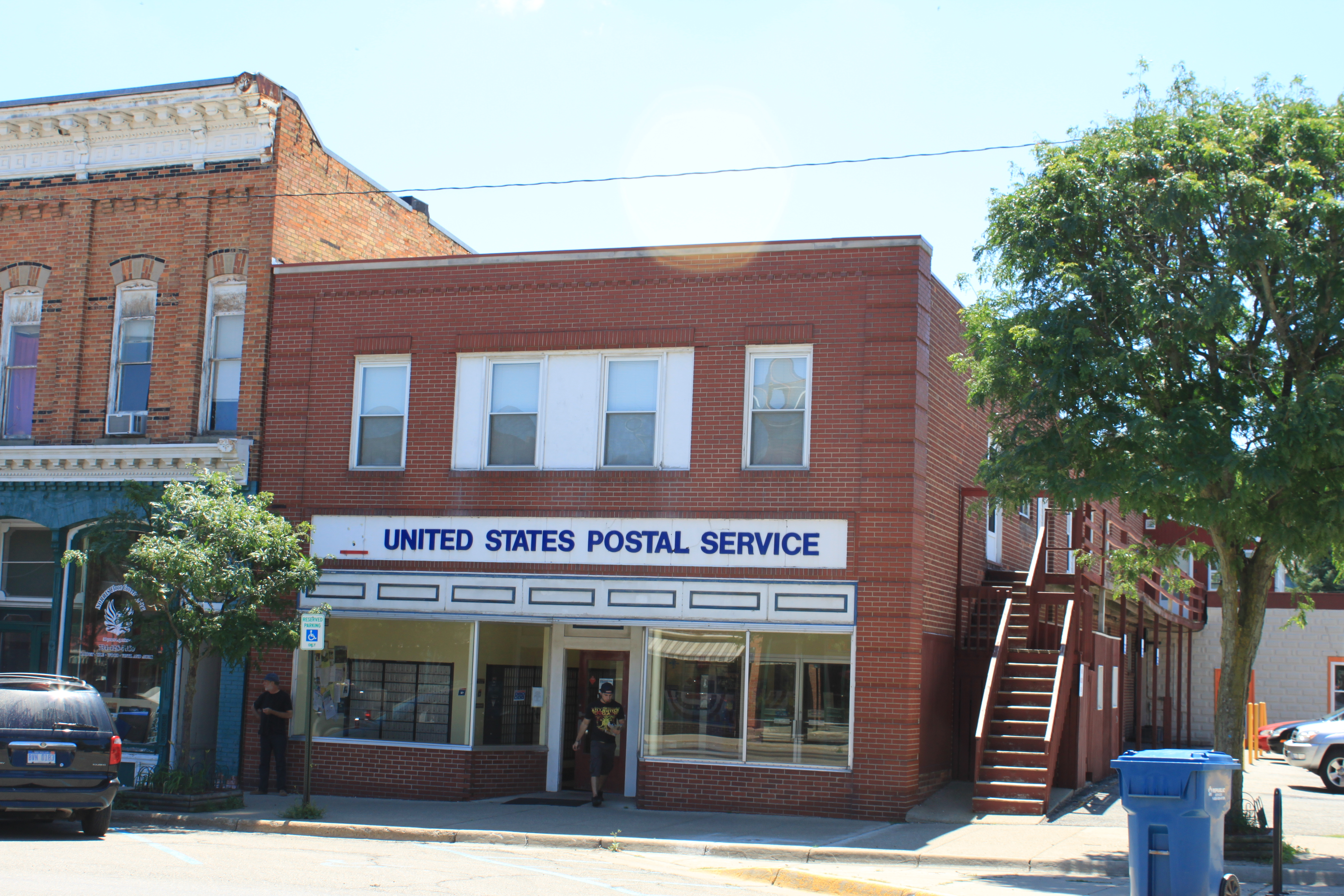
U.S. Post Office in Manchester

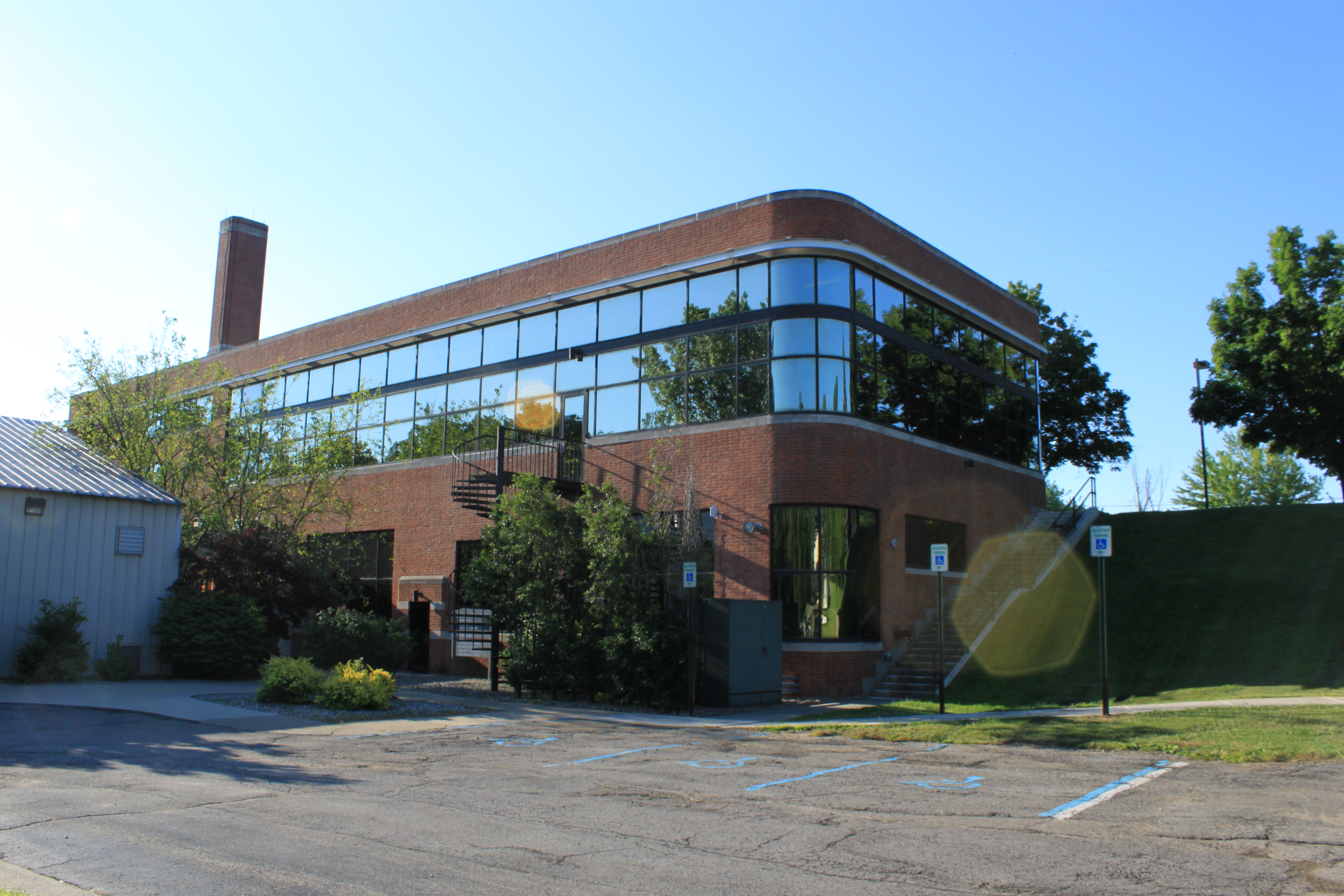
Manchester Village Offices

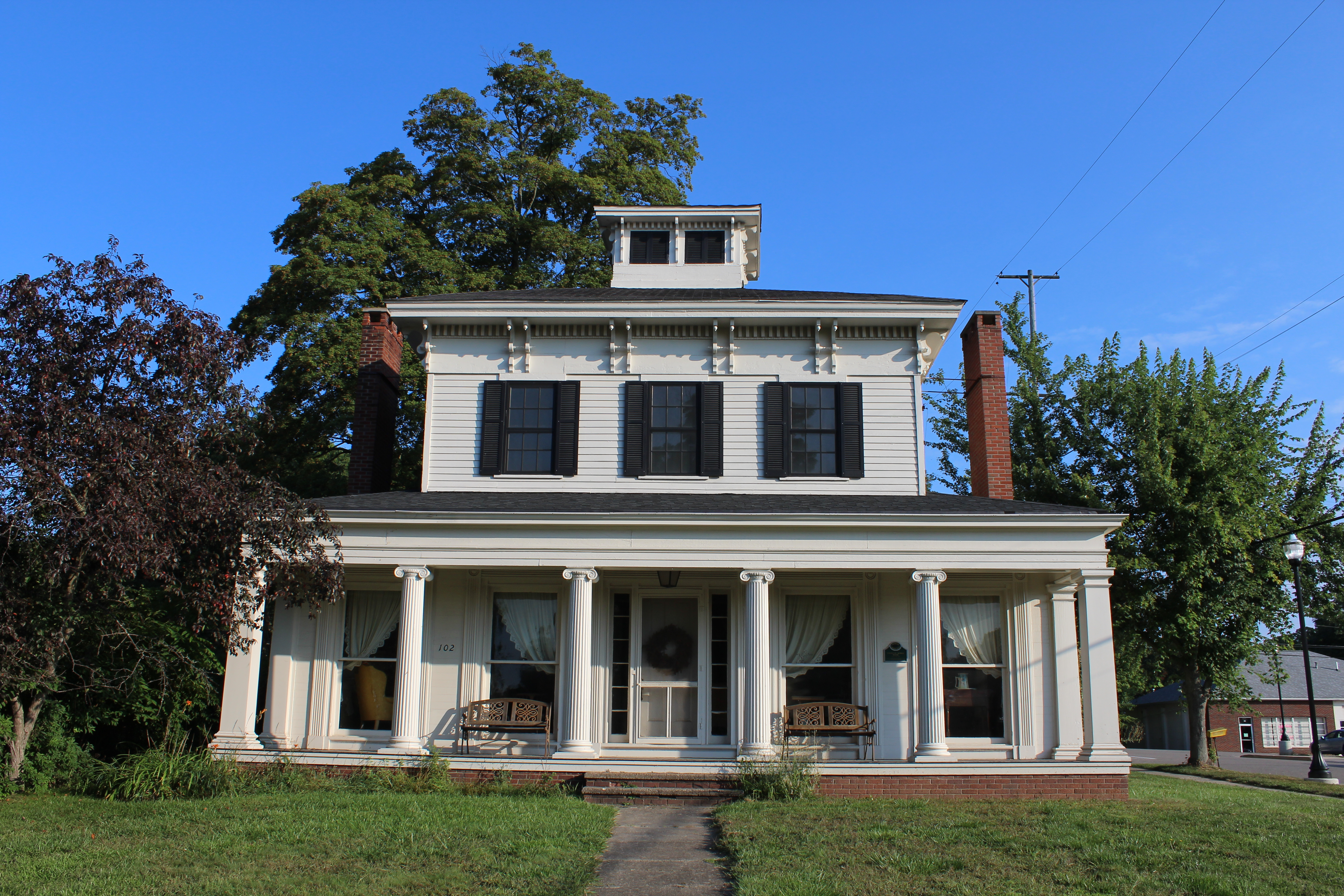
Fountain–Bessac House

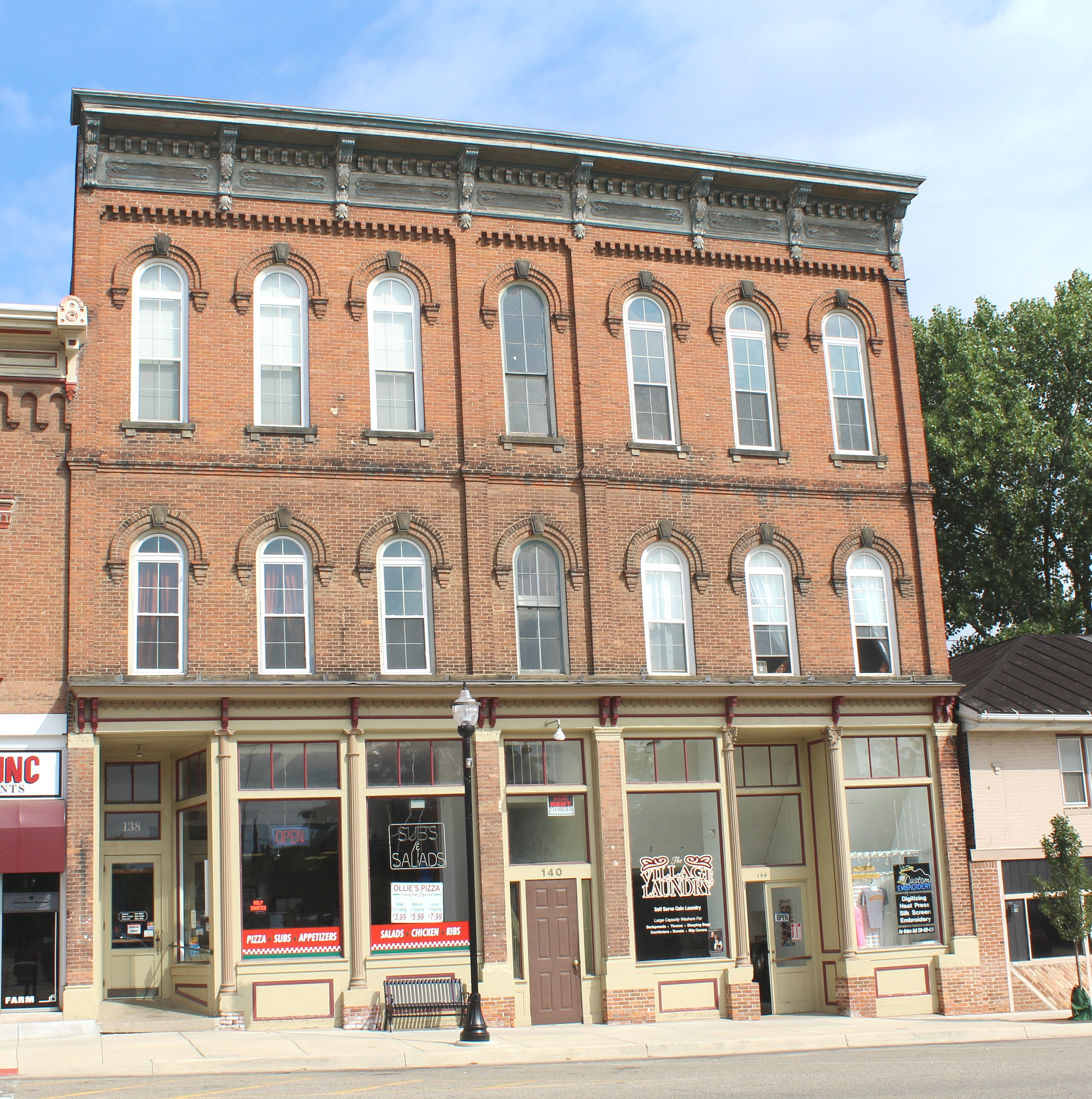
Historic Goodyear Block
