= Goddard Chapel =

Historic chapel in Marion, Illinois, US

- U.S. National Register of Historic Places
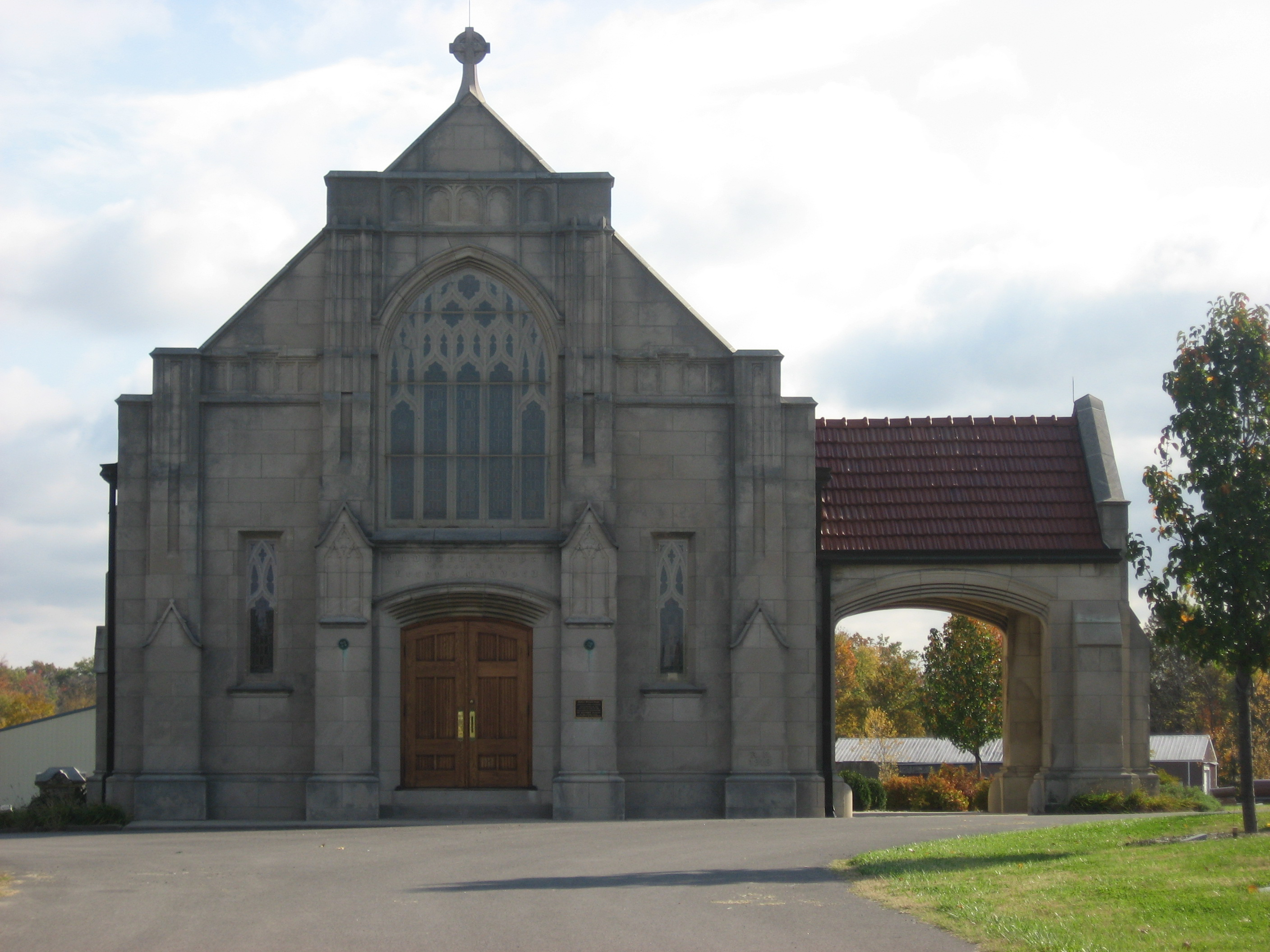
- Front of the chapel

- Location within Illinois Location within the United States
- Location: Rose Hill Cemetery, Marion, Illinois
- Coordinates: 37°44′35.5″N 88°55′54″W
- Area: 0.5 acres (0.20 ha)
- Built: 1918
- Architect: John A. Nyden
- Architectural style: Gothic Revival
- NRHP reference No.: 86003157
- Added to NRHP: November 6, 1986

Goddard Chapel is a historic chapel located in Rose Hill Cemetery in Marion, Illinois. The chapel was constructed in 1918 through a donation from Leroy A. Goddard, who served two terms as Marion's mayor and founded the city's first bank. Chicago architect John A. Nyden designed the chapel in the Gothic Revival style. The church is built out of Bedford limestone and is topped by a red clay tile roof. The doors and windows to the church are set in a variety of Gothic arches; the doors are set within shoulder arches, the front window is in a depressed arch, and the side and back windows are set in lancet arches. The church's windows all feature stained glass designs with a lily pattern.

The chapel was added to the National Register of Historic Places on November 6, 1986.
