= Fountain Hill =

Fountain Hill may refer to the following places in the United States:

- Fountain Hill, Arkansas
- Fountain Hills, Arizona
- Fountain Hill, Pennsylvania

== See also ==
- Fountains Fell, North Yorkshire, England
