= Fountain–Bessac House =

Historic house in Michigan, United States

- U.S. National Register of Historic Places
- Michigan State Historic Site
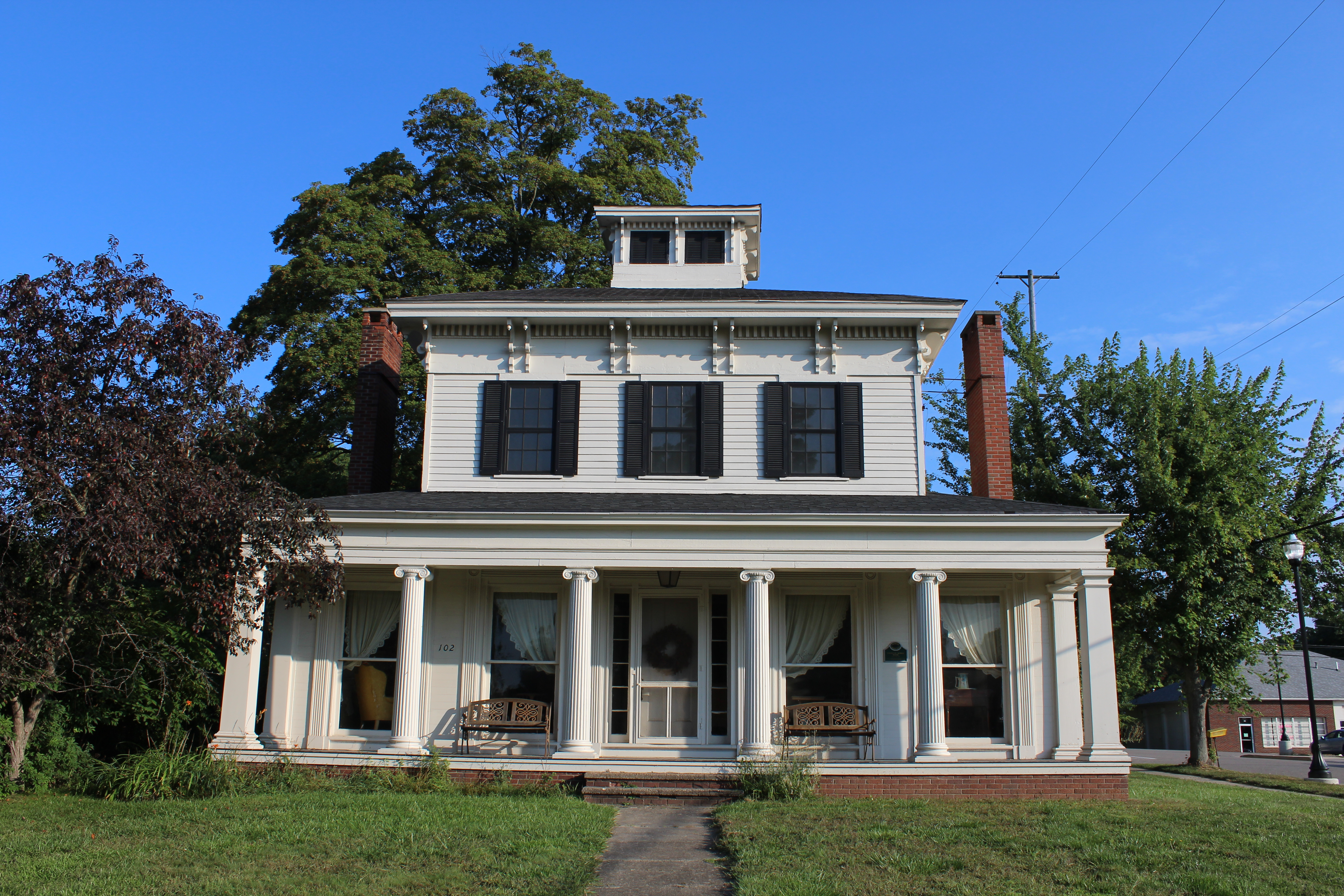
- Fountain–Bessac House

- Location within Michigan Location within the United States
- Interactive map
- Location: 102 W. Main St., Manchester, Michigan
- Coordinates: 42°8′58″N 84°2′26″W
- Area: less than one acre
- Built: 1842
- Built by: William S. Carr
- Architectural style: Greek Revival, Italian Villa
- NRHP reference No.: 88001833

Significant dates
- Added to NRHP: September 29, 1988
- Designated MSHS: September 16, 1986

The Fountain–Bessac House, also known as the Fountain-Haeussler House, is a private house located at 102 W. Main Street in Manchester, Michigan. It was designated a Michigan State Historic Site in 1986 and listed on the National Register of Historic Places in 1988.

== History ==
In 1842, flour mill owner Jacob (or Jabez) Fountain hired local builder William S. Carr to build what is now the first floor of this house. Fountain built the house in part to outshine the nearby house of banker John Kief. In 1850, Fountain moved into an even more opulent home, and sold the house to Dr. William Bessac. In 1853, Bessac added a second story; the Bessac family moved into the newly constructed second floor and Dr. Bessac used the first floor for his medical practice. Bessac died in 1885, and the house passed to his daughter Mary, and her husband, pharmacist George Haeussler. They lived in the house until George and then Mary died, after which ownership of the house passed to their son Raynor Haeussler.

By 1947, the house had been either vacant or rented for some years, and Raynor Haeussler sold it to potato farmers Mary and Tom Walton. In 1949–50, the Waltons hired Emil Lorch, dean emeritus of the University of Michigan School of Architecture, to renovate and update the building. They added a garage and breezeway to the rear of the house. The Waltons sold the house to Katharine McKibben in 1990.

== Description ==
The Fountain–Bessac House is a two-story frame structure with a symmetrical facade. The two stages of construction are clearly visible in this structure. The 1842 first floor is of a Greek Revival design, with a five-bay front facade and a portico stretching the width of the house. The pyramidal roof of the first floor segues to a smaller second story set back from the first, designed in an Italian Villa style with a smaller three-bay facade. The second floor also has a pyramidal roof, which is capped by a cupola at the top of the house. The stepped configuration of the first floor, second floor, and cupola has drawn comparisons to a wedding cake. A more modern garage and breezeway is attached to the rear of the house.
