= Fountain Township =

Fountain Township may refer to:

- Fountain Township, Ottawa County, Kansas, in Ottawa County, Kansas
- Fountain Township, Fillmore County, Minnesota
- Fountain Township, Pitt County, North Carolina, in Pitt County, North Carolina
- Fountain Township, Edmunds County, South Dakota, in Edmunds County, South Dakota
