= Building at 257 East Delaware =

Apartment building in Chicago, Illinois

- U.S. National Register of Historic Places
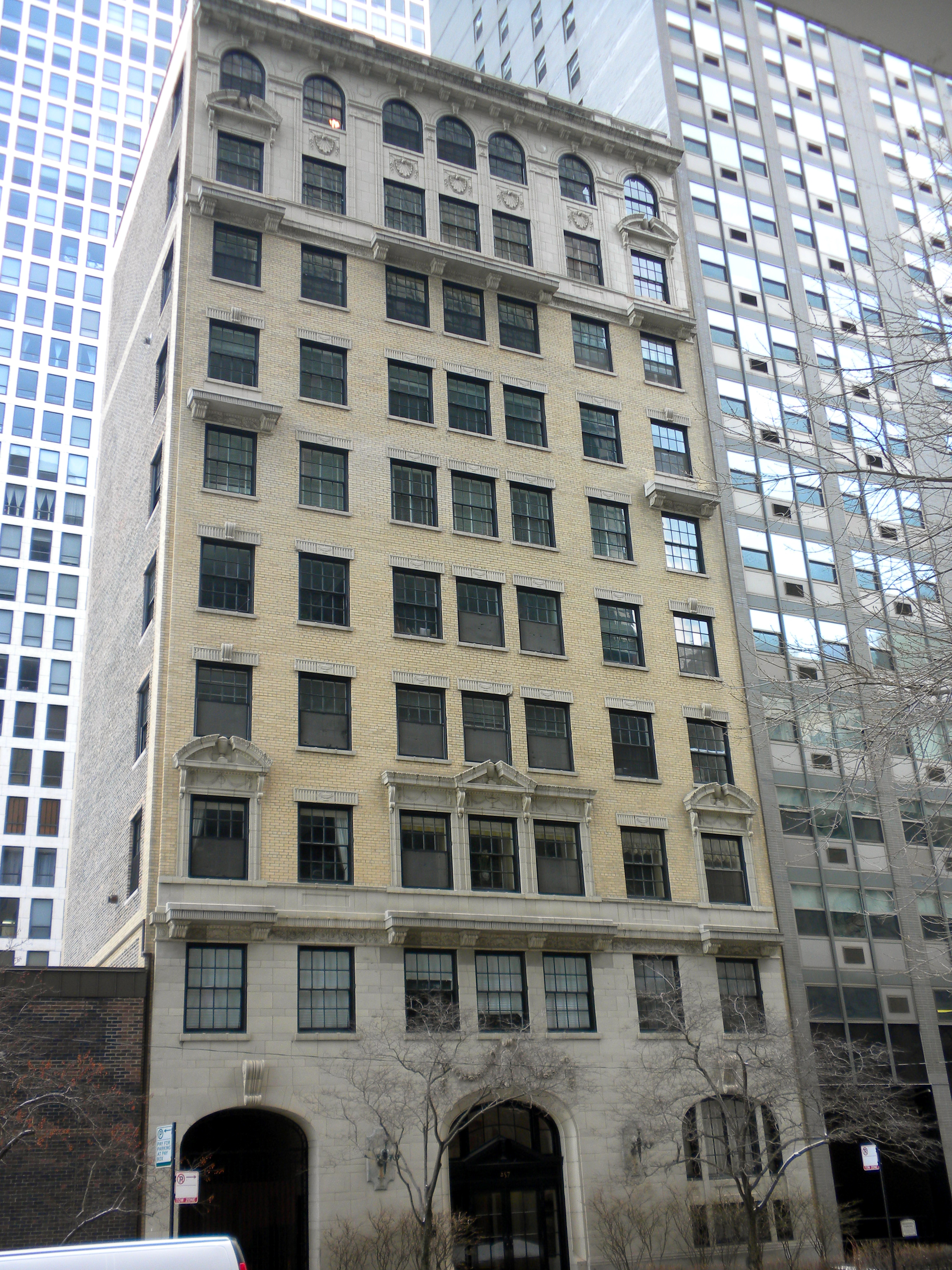

- Location within Illinois Location within the United States
- Location: 257 E. Delaware, Chicago, Illinois
- Coordinates: 41°53′57″N 87°37′10″W
- Area: less than one acre
- Built: 1917
- Architect: John Nyden
- Architectural style: Renaissance Revival
- NRHP reference No.: 87001113
- Added to NRHP: June 26, 1987

The Building at 257 East Delaware is a historic apartment building located at 257 East Delaware Place in the Near North Side neighborhood of Chicago, Illinois. The building was built in 1917 during a wave of luxury apartment construction on the Near North Side. Architect John Nyden designed the Renaissance Revival building, which was one of Chicago's first luxury apartments designed in the style. Like most skyscrapers of the area, the ten-story building is split into three parts visually; the upper two and lower two floors are faced with terra cotta and are connected by a brick shaft. The building is topped with a cornice and balustrade. Terra cotta lintels and decorations add an Adamesque influence to the building.

The building was added to the National Register of Historic Places on June 26, 1987.
