= Fountain Plaza Apartments =

- U.S. National Register of Historic Places
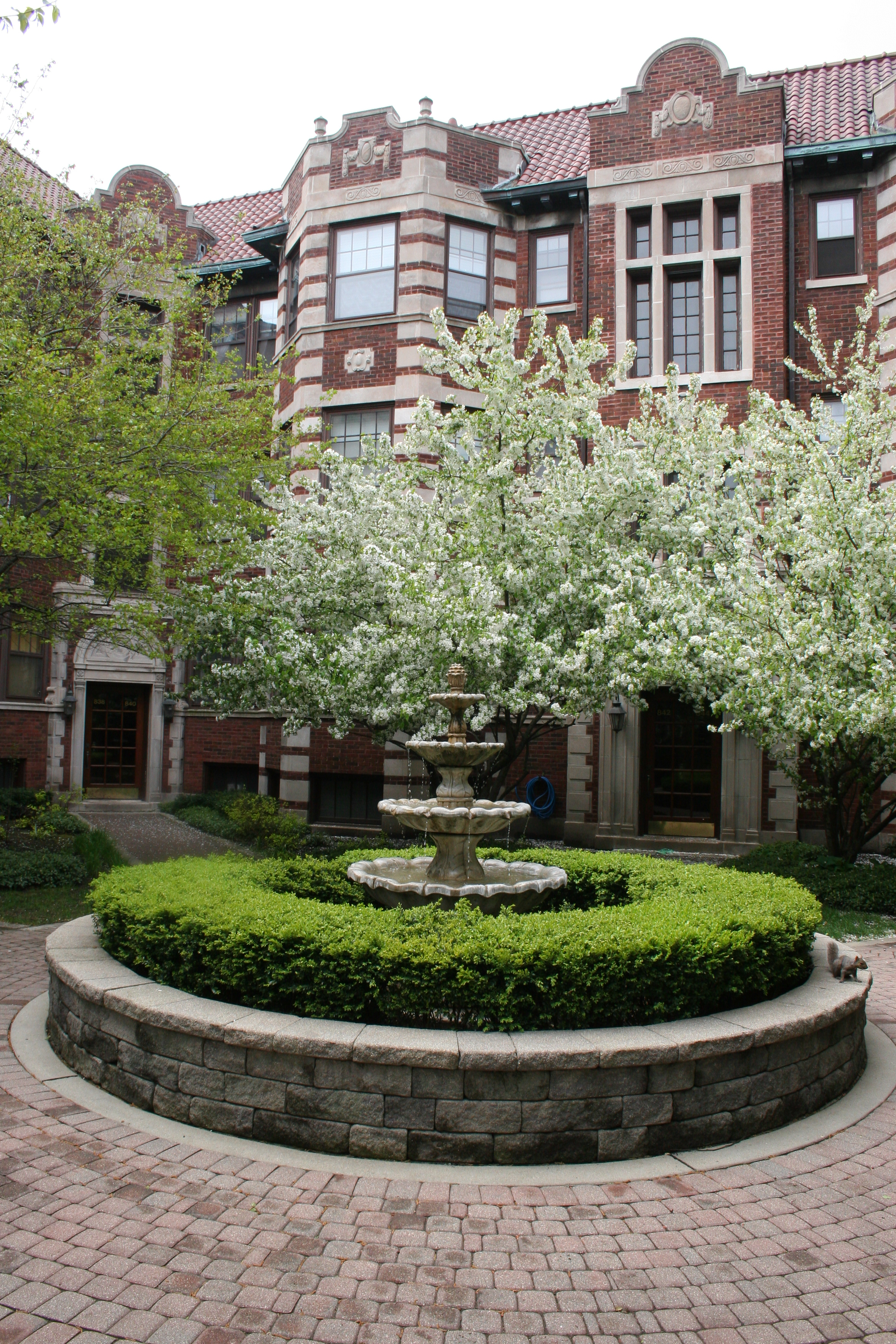
- Fountain Plaza Apartments in 2012

- Location within Chicago metropolitan area Location within Illinois Location within the United States
- Location: 830-856 Hinman Ave., Evanston, Illinois
- Coordinates: 42°02′00″N 87°40′42″W
- Area: 0.6 acres (0.24 ha)
- Built: 1922
- Architect: John Nyden
- Architectural style: Classical Revival
- MPS: Suburban Apartment Buildings in Evanston TR
- NRHP reference No.: 84000992
- Added to NRHP: March 15, 1984

Fountain Plaza Apartments is a historic apartment building at 830-856 Hinman Avenue in Evanston, Illinois. The three-story brick building was built in 1922. Swedish-born architect John A. Nyden, who also designed multiple other apartment buildings in Evanston, designed the building in the Classical Revival style. The building's design includes Palladian doors with fanlights, limestone quoins, and a hip roof with parapets and a cornice. The central courtyard is both raised and nearly surrounded by the building, providing privacy despite the building's proximity to a commercial district.

The building was added to the National Register of Historic Places on March 15, 1984.
