= Fountain Creek (Tennessee) =

Coordinates: 35°34′05″N 86°57′50″W

Fountain Creek is a creek in Maury County, Tennessee. It is a tributary of the Duck River.

== See also ==
- List of rivers of Tennessee
