= Fountain syndrome =

- Other names: Deafness-skeletal dysplasia-coarse face with full lips syndrome, Deafness-skeletal dysplasia-lip granuloma syndrome
- Fountain syndrome has an autosomal recessive pattern of inheritance.
- Frequency: 0.0001%

Fountain syndrome is an autosomal recessive congenital disorder characterized by intellectual disability, deafness, skeletal abnormalities and a coarse face with full lips. The abnormal swelling of the cheeks and lips are due to the excessive accumulation of body fluids under the skin. The deafness is due to malformation of the cochlea structure within the inner ear.

== Cause ==
The exact cause of the disorder is unknown, but it is believed to be inherited in an autosomal recessive manner.

== Diagnosis ==
Fountain syndrome is usually diagnosed in infancy or early childhood. It can be diagnosed by thorough clinical evaluation, characteristic physical findings, and specialized tests such as audiological tests and scans of the inner ear and brain.

== Treatment ==
Unfortunately, there is not one specific treatment option that can rid a person of this syndrome. However, there are many routes one can take to make living with this disease a lot easier. For example, there are many treatment programs that doctors can specialize for patients and their needs. Meeting with a doctor is very crucial and these specializations can be very useful. Also, one can seek help from pediatricians, EENT doctors, audiologists, and orthopedists. Brace fittings, hearing aids, and physical therapy can also be pushed by one's doctor, so that a patient can live normally. Additionally, anticonvulsant drugs can be used to stop seizures.
