= George E. Van Hagen House =

Historic house in Illinois, United States

- U.S. National Register of Historic Places
- Location within Chicago metropolitan area Location within Illinois Location within the United States
- Location: 12 W. County Line Rd., Barrington Hills, Illinois
- Coordinates: 42°09′15″N 88°10′50″W
- Built: c. 1912
- Architect: John Nyden
- Architectural style: Arts and Crafts, Federal Revival
- NRHP reference No.: 15000966
- Added to NRHP: January 12, 2016

The George E. Van Hagen House is a historic house at 12 W. County Line Road in Barrington Hills, Illinois. The house was built circa 1912 for George Ely Van Hagen, the president of the Standard Forgings Company, and his wife Mary Wakefield Lewis Van Hagen, the granddaughter of President William Henry Harrison. Large country estates in rural suburbs such as Barrington Hills were popular with the wealthy in the early twentieth century; Van Hagen used his house's grounds for a gentleman's farm and fox hunting, typical pastimes of estate owners. Architect John Nyden gave the house an Arts and Crafts style design with Federal Revival elements. The house's design uses the simple geometric forms typical of Arts and Crafts designs throughout, with plain cylindrical columns, diamond and rectangular patterned panels, and semicircular arches atop the entrance and several windows. The Federal Revival elements are largely confined to the interior and include a plasterwork dining room ceiling, a mosaic fireplace surround, and cabinets inspired by Palladian windows.

The house was added to the National Register of Historic Places on January 12, 2016.
