= Fountain Valley =

Fountain Valley or Fountains Valley may refer to:

- Fountain Valley (British Columbia), Canada, a valley and rural community
- Fountain Valley, California, U.S., a suburban city
  - Fountain Valley High School
- Fountain Valley, Wisconsin, U.S., an unincorporated community
- Fountains Valley, Pretoria, a recreational resort in South Africa

== See also ==
- Fountain Valley School of Colorado, in Colorado Springs, Colorado, U.S.
- Fountain Valley massacre, a 1972 mass shooting at Fountain Valley Golf Course in St. Croix, United States Virgin Islands
