= Fountain City, Wisconsin =

- City
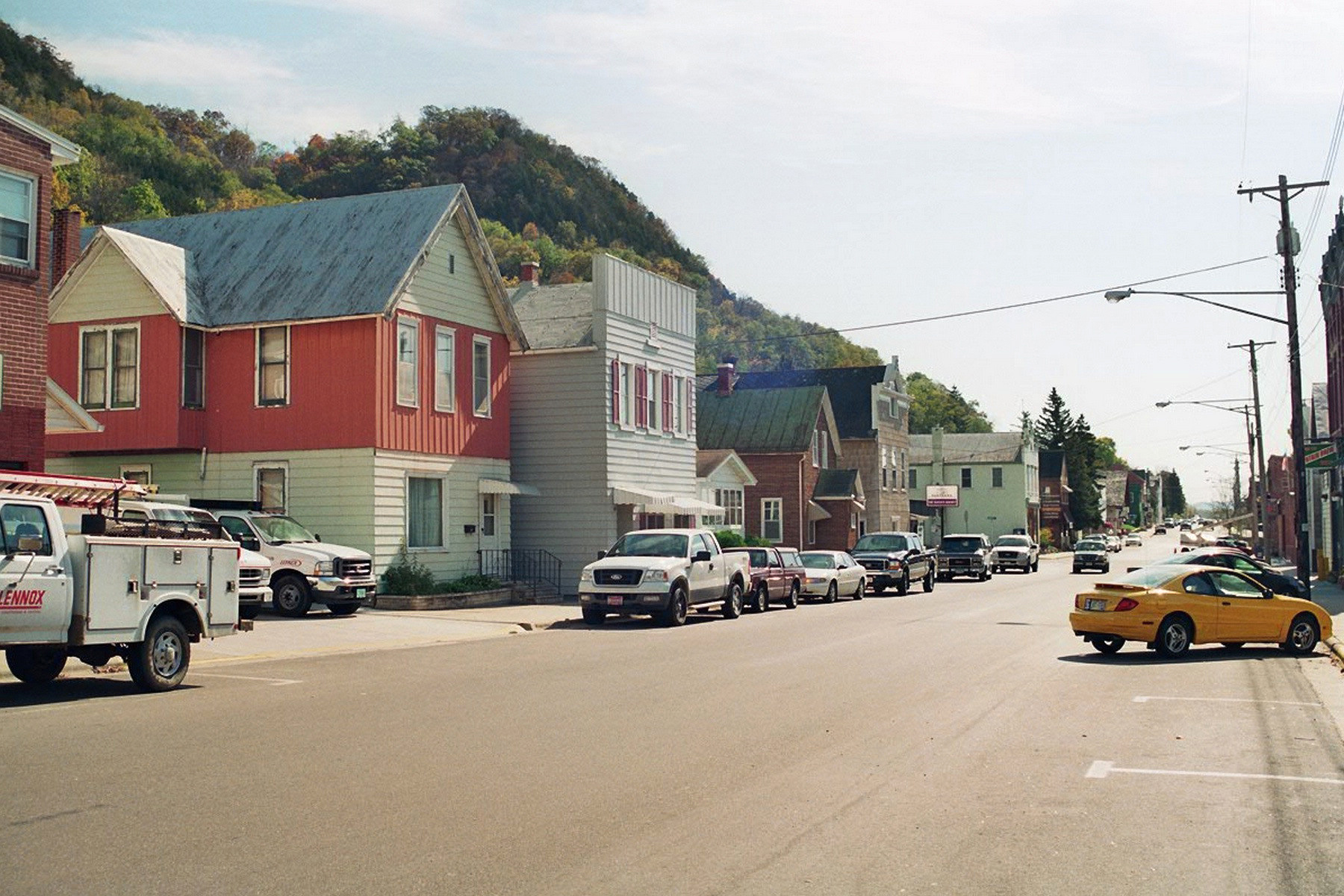
- WIS-35 through town

- Location of Fountain City in Buffalo County, Wisconsin.

- Location within Wisconsin Location within the United States
- Coordinates: 44°7′28″N 91°42′34″W
- Country: United States
- State: Wisconsin
- County: Buffalo

Area
  - Total: 5.52 sq mi (14.30 km^{2})
  - Land: 4.37 sq mi (11.33 km^{2})
  - Water: 1.15 sq mi (2.97 km^{2})
- Elevation: 669 ft (204 m)

Population (2020)
  - Total: 806
  - Density: 184/sq mi (71.1/km^{2})
- Time zone: UTC-6 (Central (CST))
  - Summer (DST): UTC-5 (CDT)
- Zip code: 54629
- Area code: 608
- FIPS code: 55-26850
- GNIS feature ID: 1565171
- Website: www.fountaincitywi.gov

Fountain City is a small city bordering the Mississippi River in Buffalo County, Wisconsin, United States. The population was 806 at the 2020 census.

== History ==
Fountain City was originally called Holmes' Landing, after Thomas A. Holmes, who settled there in 1839. Boats would stop at the landing to take on firewood, as well as water from springs not far from the river, leading to the name of Fountain City.

Fountain City was near the crash site of Northwest Airlines Flight 421.

== Geography ==
Fountain City is located at 44°7′28″N 91°42′34″W (44.124506, -91.709470), at the intersection of highways 35 and 95.

According to the United States Census Bureau, the city has a total area of 5.57 square miles (14.43 km^{2}), of which 4.29 square miles (11.11 km^{2}) are land and 1.28 square miles (3.32 km^{2}) are covered by water.

The city is located on a bend in the Mississippi River, where the river flows right at the base of the bluffs on the east side of the valley. Because of this, at some points, the city is only two houses wide; one on each side of Wisconsin Highway 35. Eagle Creek and Waumandee Creek flow into Fountain City Bay northwest of the city limits. Eagle Creek flows around the base of Eagle Bluff, one of the tallest bluffs along the Mississippi.

The steep bluffs are characteristic of the Driftless Area of Wisconsin, Minnesota, and Iowa, a region that was not smoothed over by glaciers like much of the rest of the Midwest, but rather deeply cut by runoff from the rapidly melting glaciers.

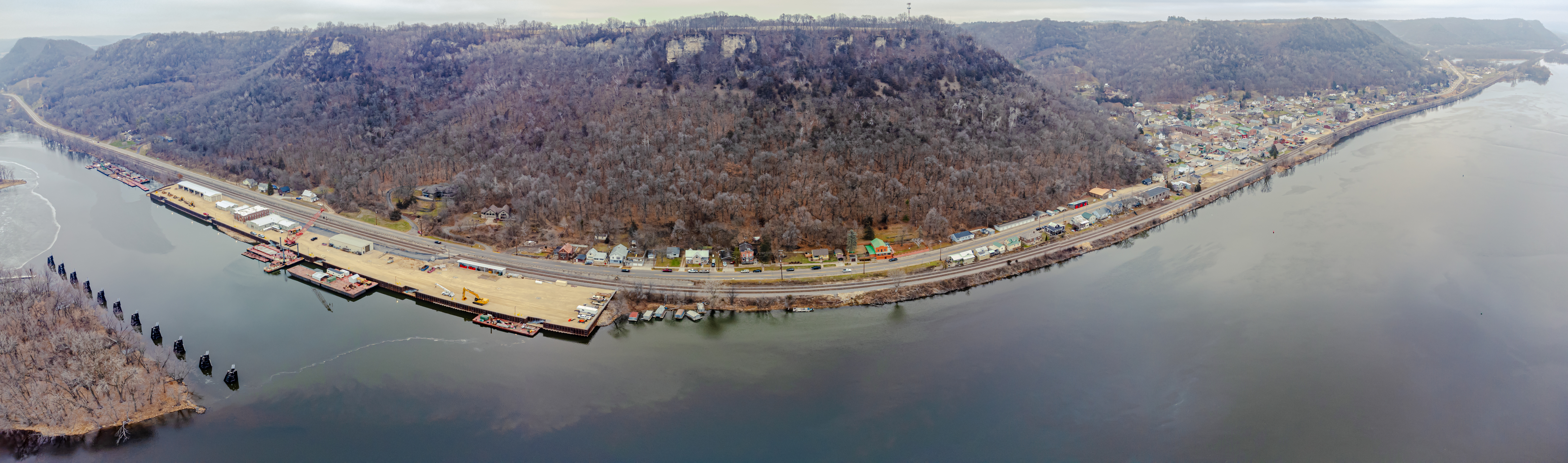

== Demographics ==
Historical population
Census	Pop.	Note	%±
1870	867		—
1880	963		11.1%
1890	972		0.9%
1900	1,031		6.1%
1910	1,031		0.0%
1920	880		−14.6%
1930	880		0.0%
1940	985		11.9%
1950	934		−5.2%
1960	934		0.0%
1970	1,017		8.9%
1980	963		−5.3%
1990	938		−2.6%
2000	983		4.8%
2010	859		−12.6%
2020	806		−6.2%
U.S. Decennial Census

=== 2010 census ===
As of the census of 2010, 859 people, 410 households, and 215 families resided in the city. The population density was 200.2 inhabitants per square mile (77.3/km^{2}). The 467 housing units averaged of 108.9 per square mile (42.0/km^{2}). The racial makeup of the city was 97.0% White, 0.1% African American, 1.4% Native American, 0.1% Asian, 0.6% from other races, and 0.8% from two or more races. Hispanics or Latinos of any race were 1.0% of the population.

Of the 410 households, 19.5% had children under the age of 18 living with them, 40.5% were married couples living together, 7.8% had a female householder with no husband present, 4.1% had a male householder with no wife present, and 47.6% were not families. About 34.9% of all households were made up of individuals, and 13.4% had someone living alone who was 65 years of age or older. The average household size was 2.10 and the average family size was 2.74.

The median age in the city was 42.3 years; 16.9% of residents were under the age of 18; 10.3% were between the ages of 18 and 24; 26.5% were from 25 to 44; 28.6% were from 45 to 64; and 17.8% were 65 years of age or older. The gender makeup of the city was 53.1% male and 46.9% female.

=== 2000 census ===
As of the census of 2000, 983 people, 444 households, and 241 families resided in the city. The population density was 220.6 people per square mile (85.1/km^{2}). The 470 housing units averaged 105.5 per square mile (40.7/km^{2}). The racial makeup of the city was 99.49% White, 0.10% Native American, 0.10% Asian, and 0.31% from two or more races. Latinos of any race were 0.10% of the population.

Of the 444 households, 25.5% had children under the age of 18 living with them, 45.0% were married couples living together, 6.3% had a female householder with no husband present, and 45.5% were not families. Around 40.1% of all households were made up of individuals, and 15.3% had someone living alone who was 65 years of age or older. The average household size was 2.11 and the average family size was 2.90.

In the city, the population was distributed as 19.7% under the age of 18, 9.8% from 18 to 24, 28.8% from 25 to 44, 22.2% from 45 to 64, and 19.5% who were 65 years of age or older. The median age was 39 years. For every 100 females, there were 102.7 males. For every 100 females age 18 and over, there were 102.8 males.

The median income for a household in the city was $31,524, and for a family was $47,692. Males had a median income of $31,488 versus $20,000 for females. The per capita income for the city was $18,396. About 2.8% of families and 6.8% of the population were below the poverty line, including 4.4% of those under age 18 and 10.8% of those age 65 or over.

== Economy ==
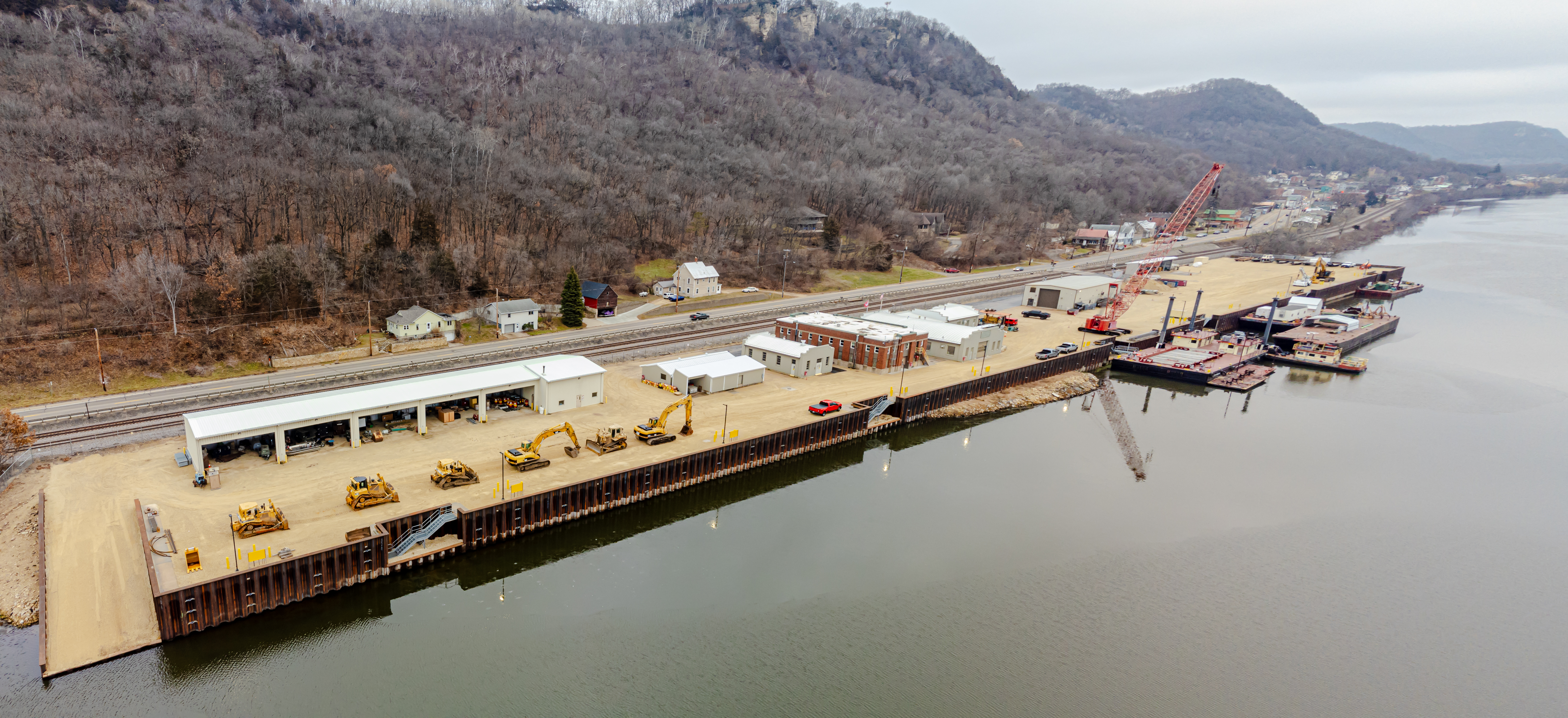
Fountain City Service Base under construction December 2023

The economy has depended on agriculture and tourism. Tourists are drawn to the river bluffs and the Mississippi River itself; the Great River Road runs through the city. Merrick State Park is a short distance up Fountain City Bay, a slough of the river.

The United States Army Corps of Engineers maintains a base on the north side of town. It was the long-time home of the dredge William A. Thompson, which the Corps used to maintain the 9-foot (2.7 m) shipping depth of the Mississippi's main channel. The dredge Goetz, which replaced the Thompson, now uses the base as its home port.

== Education ==
Fountain City is part of the Cochrane-Fountain City School District.

== Transportation ==
Fountain City is located on Wisconsin Highway 35. The west terminuses of Wisconsin Highway 95 and Wisconsin Highway 88 are also located near the city.

== Notable people ==
- Fred J. Bohri, Wisconsin State Representative, was born in Fountain City.
- Augustus F. Finkelnburg, Wisconsin legislator and judge, lived in Fountain City.
- Henry Roettiger, Wisconsin State Representative, was born in Fountain City.
- John J. Senn, Wisconsin State Representative, lived in Fountain City.
- Mark Wunderlich, poet, grew up in Fountain City.

== Images ==
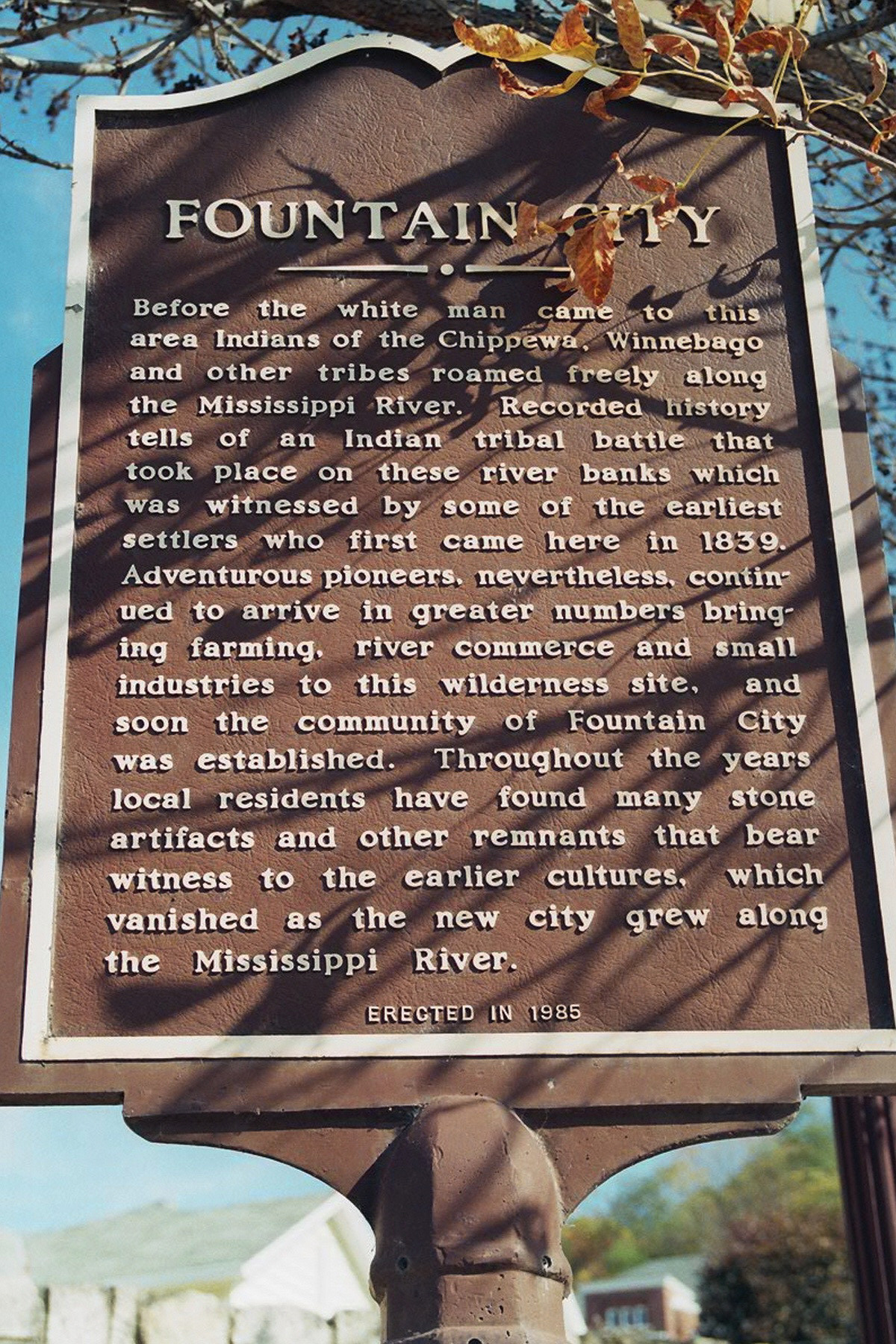
Historical marker

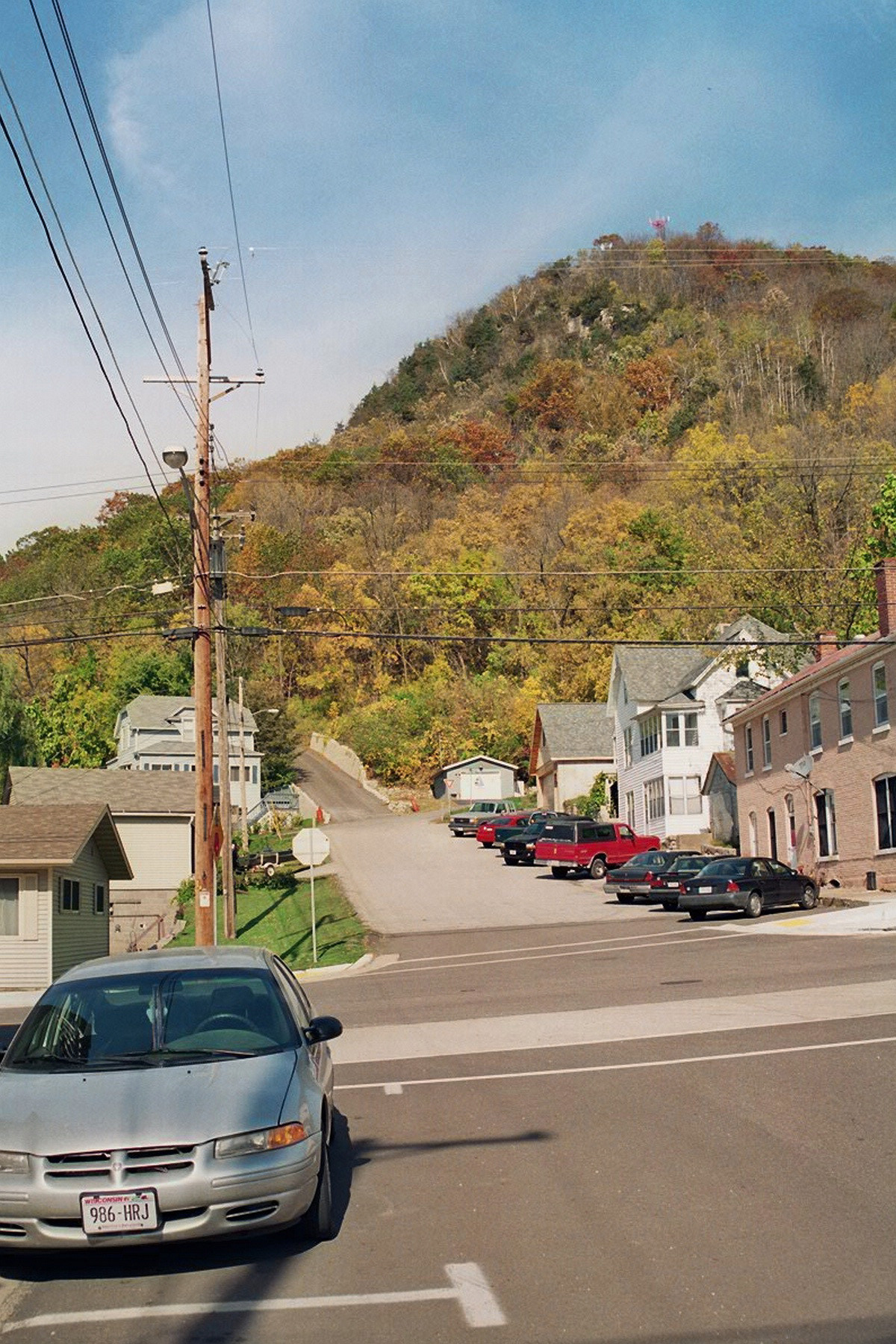
Bluffs overlooking the city

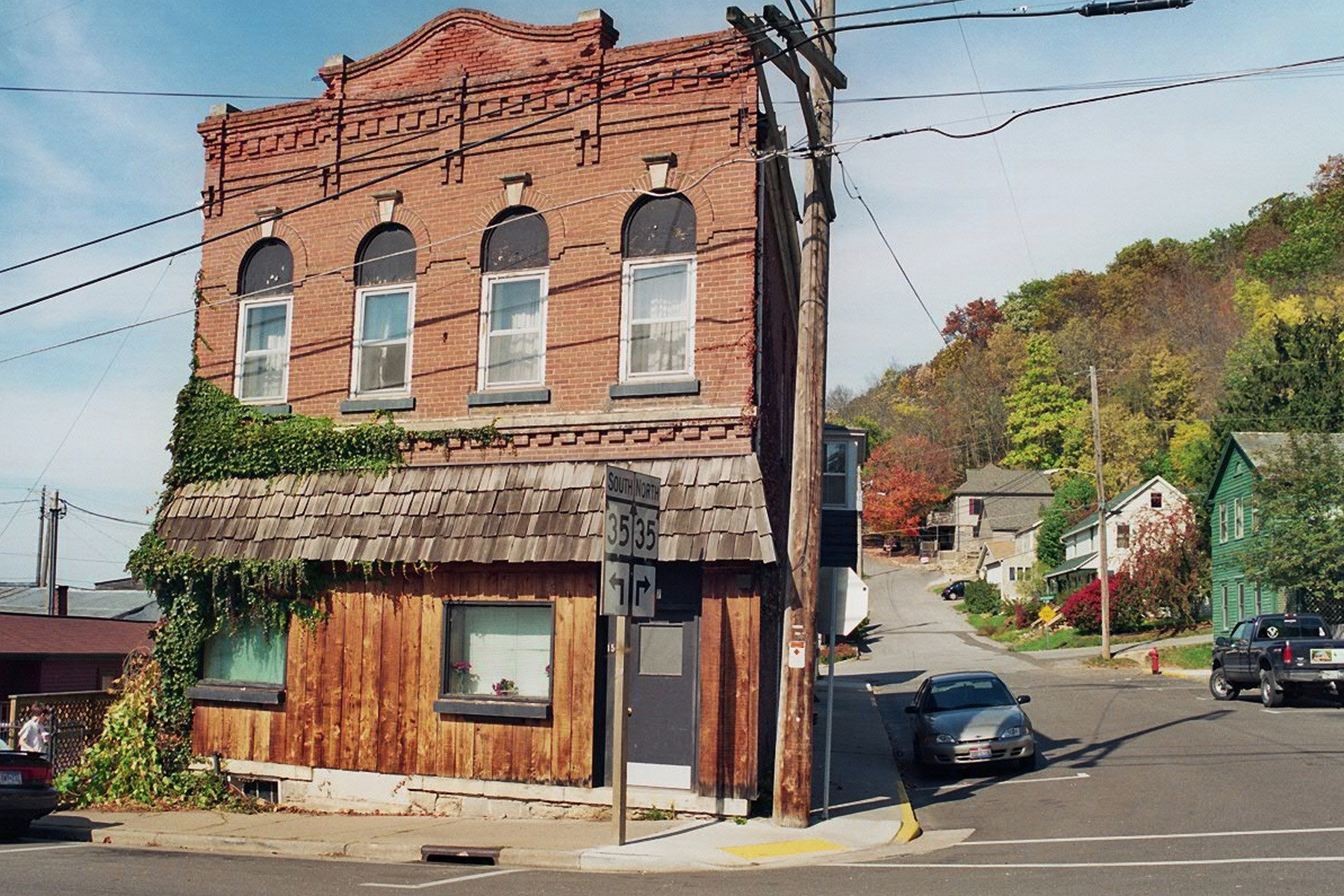
Downtown

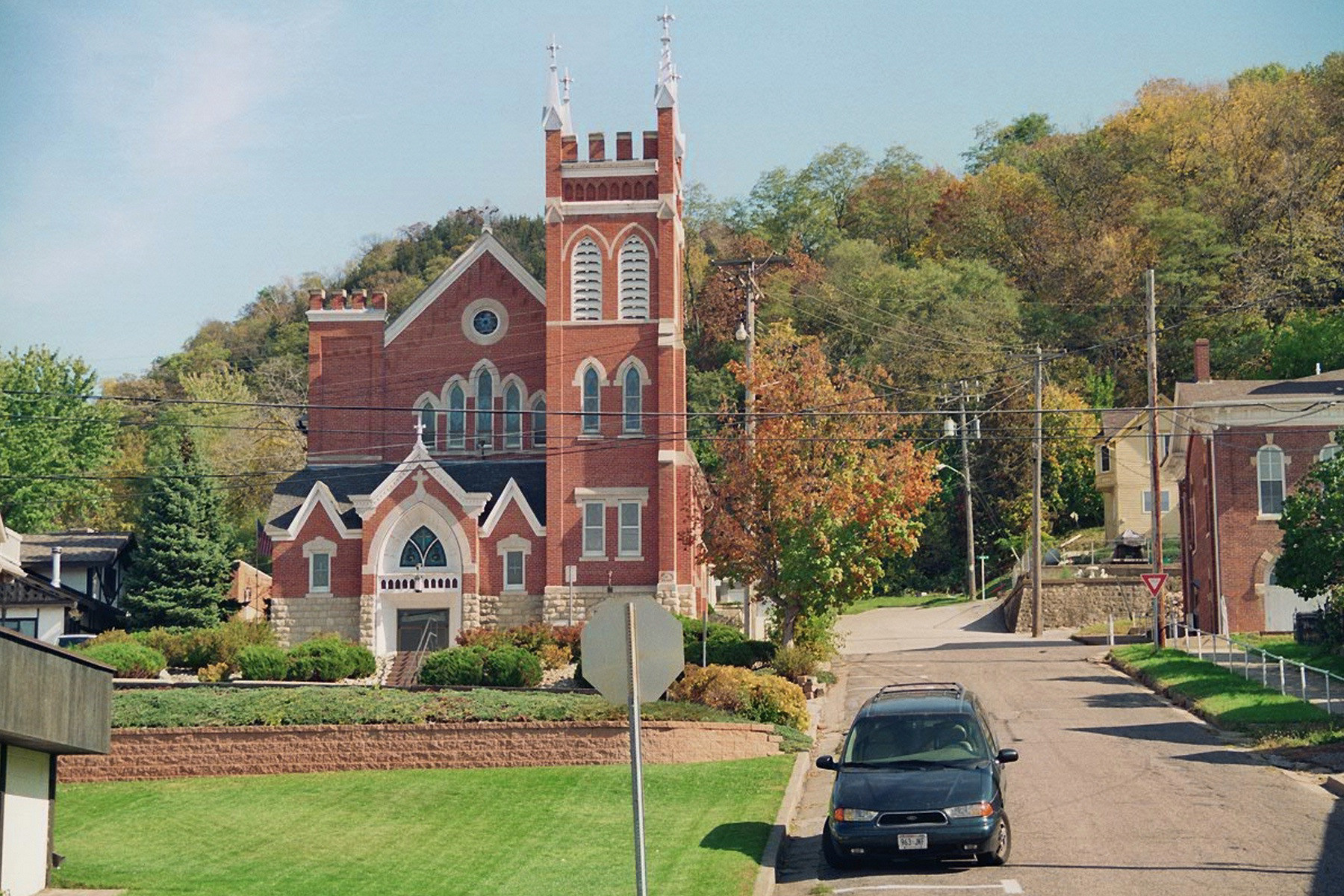
Catholic Church

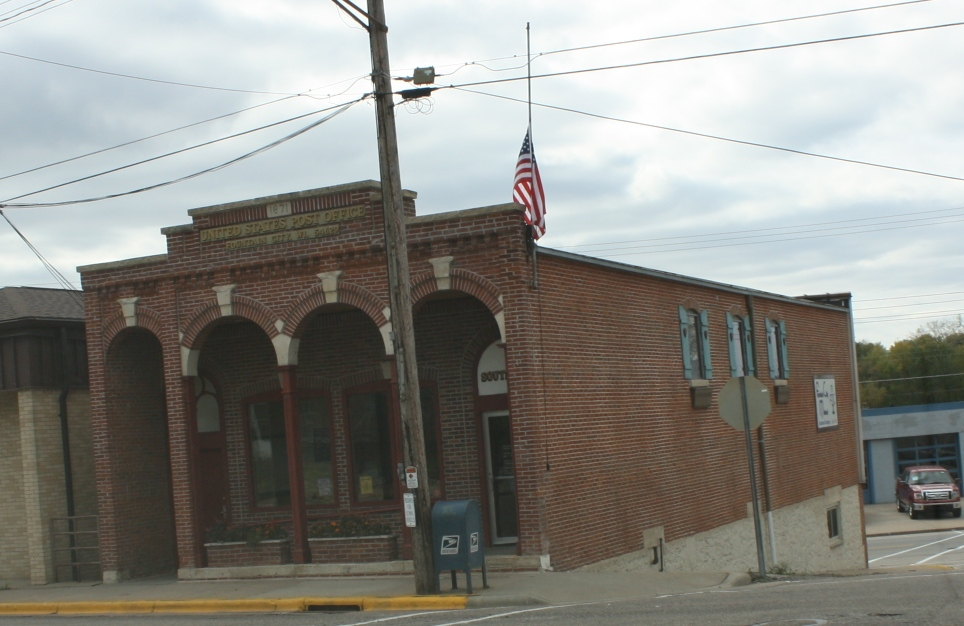
Post office

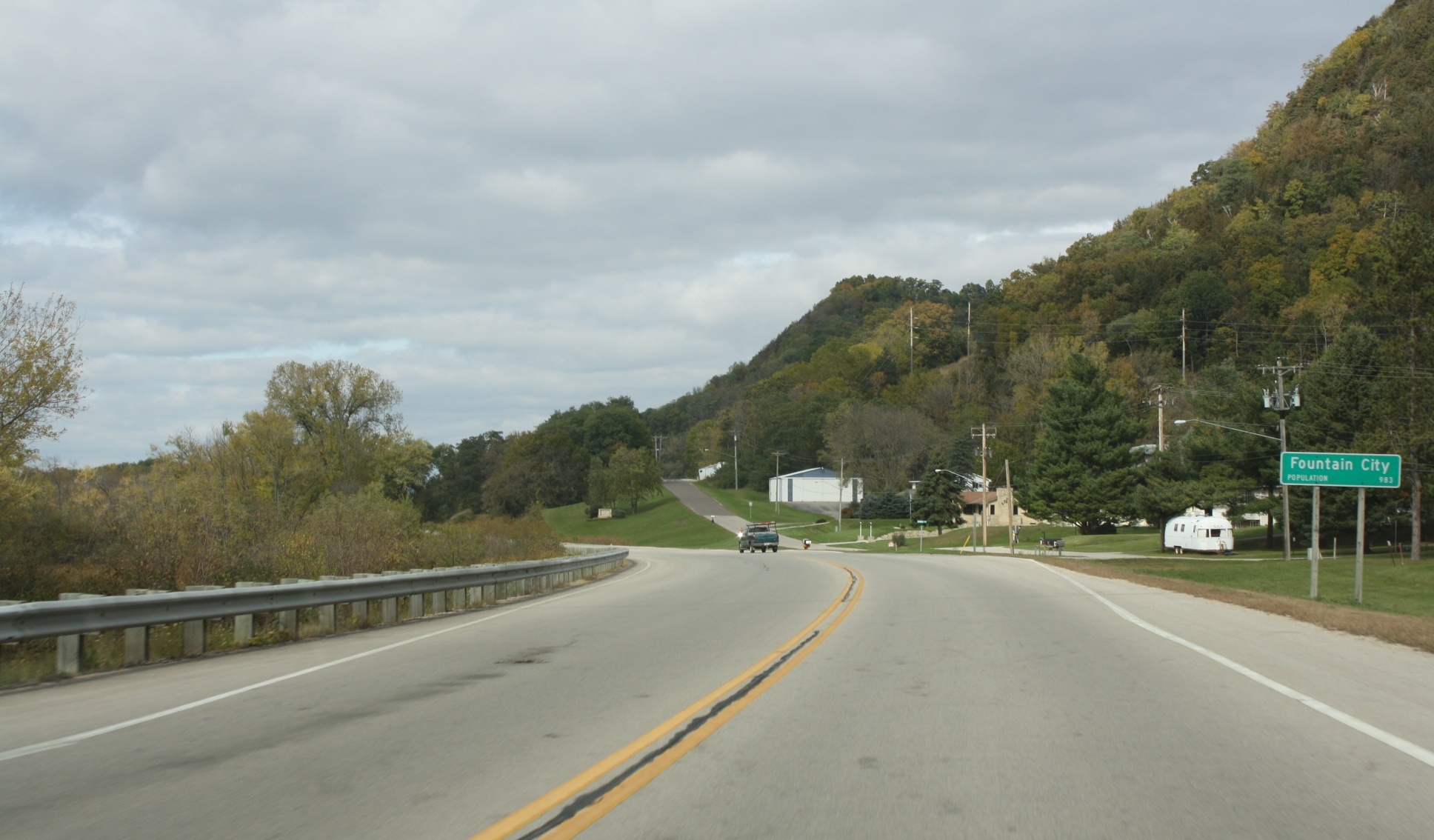
Sign

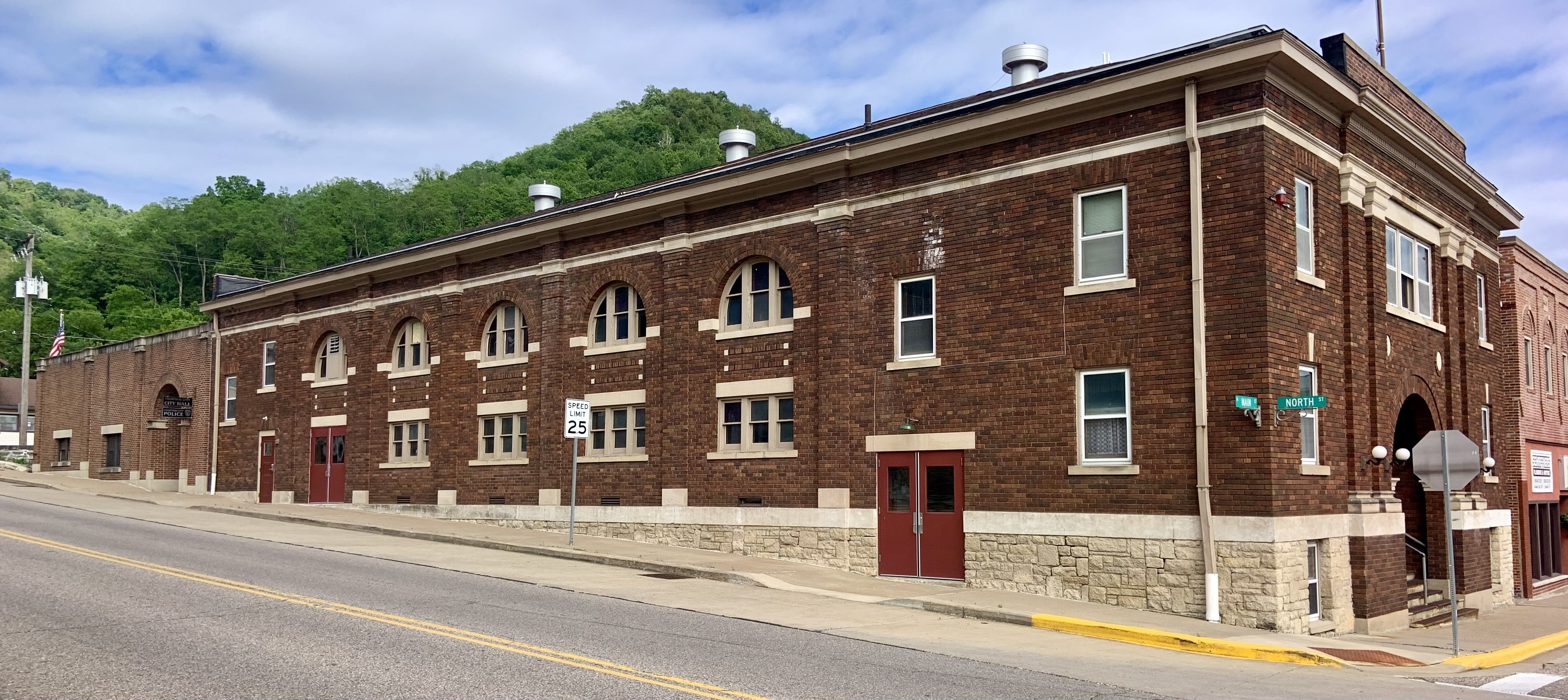
Fountain City Hall and Police Department
