= Court justice =

Court justice may refer to:

- Court Justice (TV series), an Australian TV show
  - Court Justice: Sydney, an Australian TV show
- Judge, in some courts given the title of justice, one who presides over a court of law

== See also ==
- Category:Lists of judges, for various justices
- Category:Judges, for various justices
- Court of Justice (disambiguation)
- Justice (disambiguation)
- Court (disambiguation)
