= Court of Justice =

Court of Justice may refer to:

== In general ==
- court, a court of law

== Specific legal bodies ==
- Caribbean Court of Justice (CCJ) of CARICOM
- Court of Justice of the European Union (CJEU)
- European Court of Justice (ECJ), the highest court in the CJEU
- International Court of Justice (ICJ), a World Court of the UN
- Court of Justice (Brazil)
- Court of Justice (France), set up by the French Provisional Government after World War II
- Ontario Court of Justice (Canada)
- African Court of Justice of the African Union

== Other uses ==
- Court of Justice (film), a 1953 Spanish crime film

== See also ==
- Court justice (disambiguation)
- Justice (disambiguation)
- Court (disambiguation)
