= Court (surname) =

Court is a surname. Notable people with the surname include:

- Alfred Court (1883–1977), French acrobat, circus proprietor, and animal trainer
- Alyson Court (born 1973), Canadian actress
- Antoine Court (1696–1760), French Huguenot Protestant reformer
- Arthur Bertram Court (1927–2012), Australian botanist
- Charles Court (1911–2007), Premier of Western Australia and Margaret Court's father-in-law
- Claude Auguste Court (1793–1880), French soldier and mercenary, general to Maharaja Ranjit Sinjh
- David Court (footballer) (born 1944), English footballer and coach
- David Court (bishop) (born 1958), British Anglican bishop
- David Court (cricketer) (born 1980), English cricketer
- Dilly Court (born 1940), English author
- Hazel Court (1926–2008), English actress
- Leslie Court (1897–1918), British World War I flying ace
- Margaret Court (born 1942), Australian retired tennis player
- Nathan Altshiller Court (1881–1968), Polish-American mathematician
- Robert Courts (born 1978), a British politician
- William Court (1842–1910), Australian born cricketer
