= Court Justice: Sydney =

- Also known as: Court Justice: Sydney
- Country of origin: Australia
- No. of episodes: 10

Production
- Executive producer: Michael Cordell
- Production locations: The Downing Centre, Sydney
- Running time: 30 min
- Production company: CJZ

Original release
- Network: Foxtel Crime & Investigation Network
- Release: 2 July 2017

Court Justice: Sydney is an Australian factual television show that looks at the work of twelve magistrates who preside at the Downing Centre, a major courthouse complex in Sydney, New South Wales, Australia. This observational documentary series began on the Crime and Investigation Network on 2 July 2017. It is narrated by Chris Bourke.

== Overview ==
This series takes a look inside one of the world's busiest local courts. The twelve magistrates that preside at Sydney’s Downing Centre handle over 30,000 cases every year, from minor traffic offences to major assaults. The defendants can range from habitual offenders to everyday citizens that have made bad mistakes.

Court Justice is an observational documentary series made in Australia and is broadcast on Foxtel's Crime + Investigation Network. The series films real people and real cases taking place in The Downing Centre in Sydney. The twelve magistrates that preside at Sydney's Downing Centre handle over 30,000 cases every year; everything from minor traffic offences to major assaults. Court Justice Premiered on 2 July 2017 at 7.30 AEST.

The series has been filmed over a six-week period in late 2016 an each episode gives a look into 2 or 3 cases. The cases covered range from drunk driving offences to assault, theft and vandalism

Small fixed-rig cameras are set up in several courtrooms to capture all that happens, this is accompanied by commentary of the magistrates on the situations.

== Episodes ==
Season 1

1. Open For Business
2. The Demon Drink
3. All Walks of Life
4. The Last Resort
5. Importance of Parenting
6. Drugs
7. Regular Customers
8. Drink Driving
9. Self-Represented
10. Judgement
