= Oak Ridge Apartments =

- U.S. National Register of Historic Places
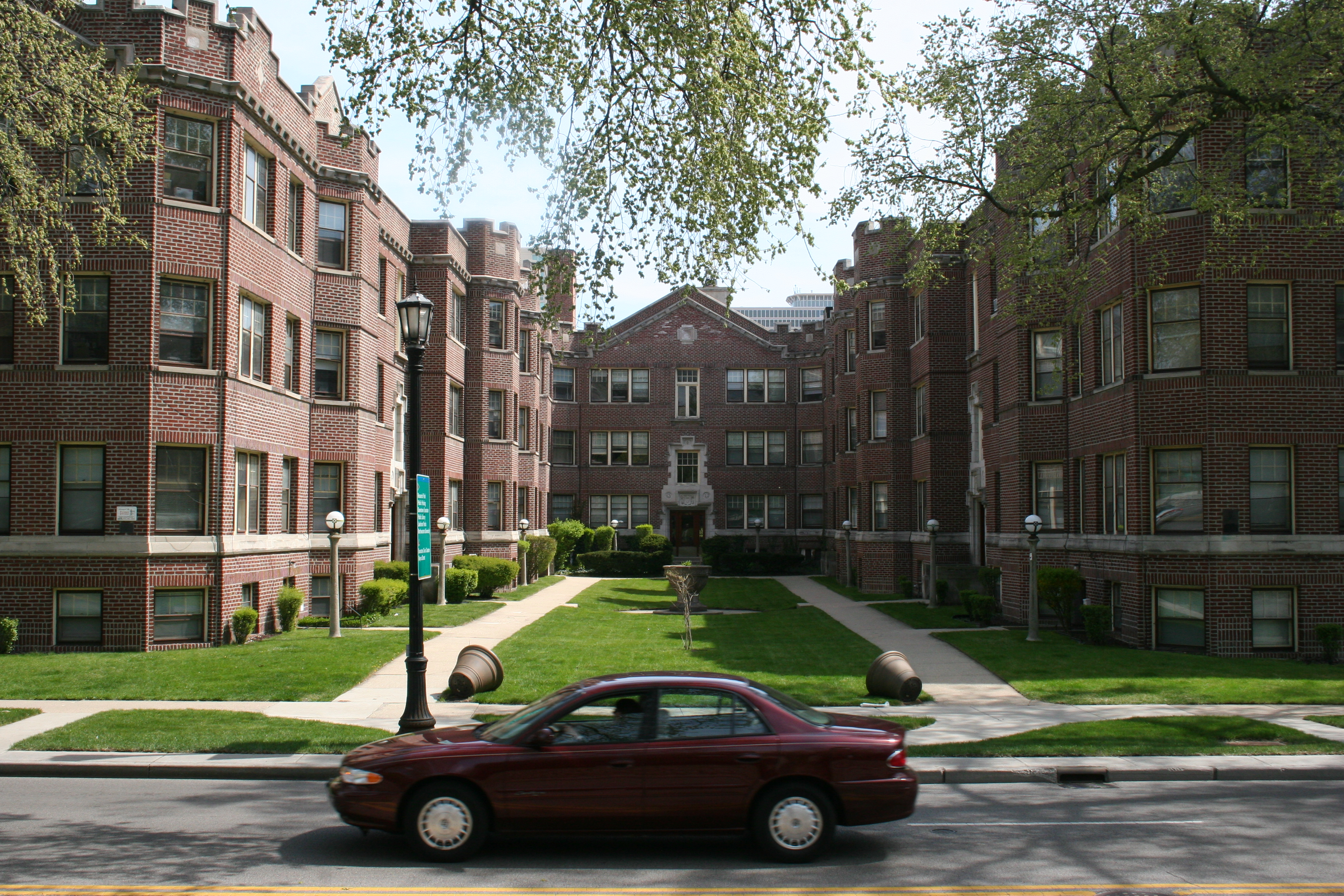
- Oak Ridge Apartments in 2012

- Location within Chicago metropolitan area Location within Illinois Location within the United States
- Location: 1615-1625 Ridge Ave., Evanston, Illinois
- Coordinates: 42°02′51″N 87°41′19″W
- Area: 0.7 acres (0.28 ha)
- Built: 1914
- Architect: Andrew Sandegren
- Architectural style: Tudor Revival
- MPS: Suburban Apartment Buildings in Evanston TR
- NRHP reference No.: 84001025
- Added to NRHP: March 15, 1984

Oak Ridge Apartments is a historic apartment building at 1615-1625 Ridge Avenue in Evanston, Illinois. The three-story brick building was built in 1914. Architect Andrew Sandegren, who also designed several Chicago apartment buildings, designed the building in the Tudor Revival style; Sandegren would go on to live in the building. The building features projecting entrance bays, an open central courtyard, and a crenellated roofline with projecting gables. Each apartment included amenities meant to cater to upper-class residents, such as servants' quarters, sunrooms, and brick fireplaces.

The building was added to the National Register of Historic Places on March 15, 1984.
