= William Court =

Australian-born English cricketer

Personal information
- Full name: William Thomas Court
- Born: 1842; Sydney, Colony of New South Wales
- Died: 31 May 1910 (aged 67–68); Wateringbury, Kent, England
- Batting: Right-handed
- Role: Wicket-keeper

Domestic team information
- Years: Team
- 1867: Kent
- Source: CricInfo, 4 January 2012

William Thomas Court (1842 – 31 May 1910) was an Australian-born English amateur cricketer who played in one first-class cricket match for Kent County Cricket Club in 1867. Court was wicket-keeper who batted right-handed.

Court was born at Sydney in New South Wales in 1842, the son of John and Rebecca Court. His family returned to England during Court's childhood, his father, who had been born at Swalecliffe and farmed at Wrotham before emigrating, resumed farming near Maidstone in Kent.

A club cricketer including The Mote and Bearsted, Court made a single first-class cricket appearance for Kent against Sussex in 1867 at Hove, scoring 11 runs and making a duck in his two innings. He played a minor match for the Gentlemen of Kent on the same ground immediately after his first-class debut.

By 1871 Court had taken on his own farm near Maidstone and later farmed at nearby Wateringbury. He married Charlotte Lovett; the couple had two sons. He died at Wateringbury in 1910 aged 68.

== Bibliography ==
- Carlaw, Derek (2020). Kent County Cricketers, A to Z: Part One (1806–1914) (PDF). Cardiff: ACS.
