= Court (disambiguation) =

A court is a tribunal, often a governmental institution, with the authority to adjudicate legal disputes.

Court or courts may also refer to:

== Institutions ==
- Royal court, the retinue and larger household and entourage of a monarch, prince of the church, or a high nobleman

== Places ==
- Court, Saskatchewan, hamlet in Canada
- Court, Switzerland, a municipality in the Canton of Berne
- Court (Barry electoral ward), in the Vale of Glamorgan, Wales
- Court (District Electoral Area), in Belfast, Northern Ireland
- Court, any one of several places listed in the National Register of Historic Places listings in Pasadena, California
- Courts Island, Tasmania
- Court Hotel, a bar and music venue in Perth, Western Australia
- The Court, Charlton Mackrell, house in Somerset, England

== People ==
- Court (surname)

== Architecture ==
- Food court, a collection of retail outlets selling food ready to eat
- Game court, a defined playing area with a prepared surface, for a game or sport, usually with solid boundaries
  - Basketball court, a playing surface, consisting of a rectangular floor, with baskets at each end where the sport of basketball is played
  - Tennis court, the venue where the sport of tennis is played

== Arts and entertainment ==
- Court (2014 film), an Indian courtroom drama film
- Court (2025 film), an Indian Telugu language legal drama film
- The Court (TV series), a 2002 American legal drama television series
- "The Court" (song), 2023 song by Peter Gabriel

== Brands and enterprises ==
- Court Line, a defunct frill-free charter airline
- Courts (retailer), a furniture retailer in the Caribbean and Pacific, and formerly the United Kingdom

== Other uses ==
- Court, a social group of animals, notably kangaroos
- Court, a verb meaning to seek the affections of another, see courtship
- Cul-de-sac, a dead-end street with a circular turnaround area for vehicles to turn around and exit back the way they came in
