= The Forest and Annex =

- U.S. National Register of Historic Places
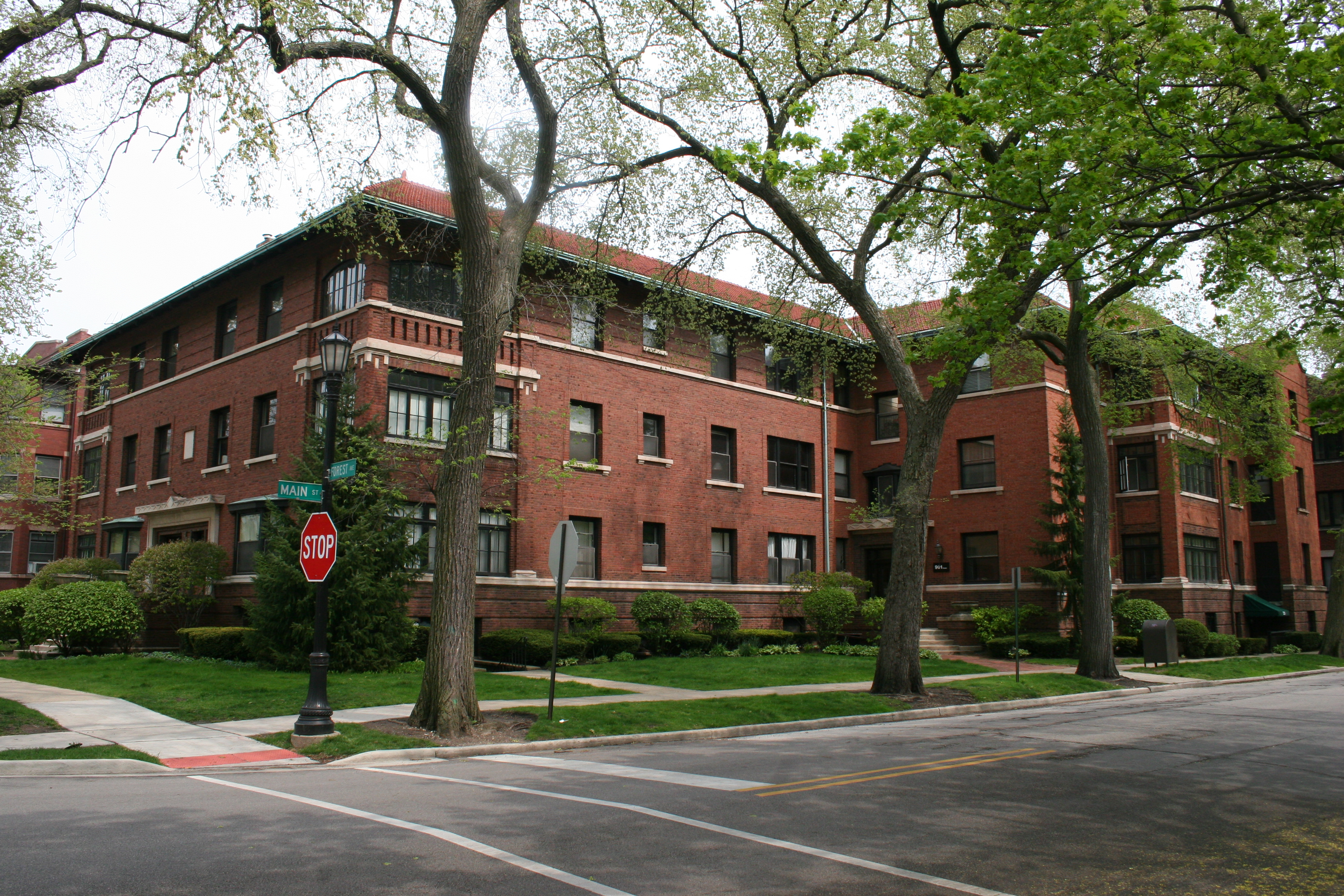
- The Forest and Annex in 2012

- Location within Chicago metropolitan area Location within Illinois Location within the United States
- Location: 901-905 Forest Ave., Evanston, Illinois
- Coordinates: 42°02′02″N 87°40′27″W
- Area: 0.3 acres (0.12 ha)
- Built: 1909
- Built by: Bully & Andrews
- Architectural style: Prairie School
- MPS: Suburban Apartment Buildings in Evanston TR
- NRHP reference No.: 84000991
- Added to NRHP: March 15, 1984

The Forest and Annex is a historic apartment building at 901-905 Forest Avenue in Evanston, Illinois. Owner Alfred B. Andrews built The Forest in 1909 and added the annex to the original building in 1912. Andrews would later author Evanston's early zoning ordinances, and he planned his building accordingly, with a spacious lawn providing plenty of room between it and the street. The building has a Prairie School design with a horizontal emphasis, patterned brick, and wide eaves. The 11 apartments in the building all included features such as wood paneling and flooring, fireplaces, and rooms for housekeepers.

The building was added to the National Register of Historic Places on March 15, 1984.
